= Chair tiling =

Nonperiodic substitution tiling

The chair substitution (left) and a portion of a chair tiling (right)

In geometry, a chair tiling (or L tiling) is a nonperiodic substitution tiling created from L-tromino prototiles. These prototiles are examples of rep-tiles and so an iterative process of decomposing the L tiles into smaller copies and then rescaling them to their original size can be used to cover patches of the plane. Chair tilings do not possess translational symmetry, i.e., they are examples of nonperiodic tilings, but the chair tiles are not aperiodic tiles since they are not forced to tile nonperiodically by themselves. The trilobite and cross tiles are aperiodic tiles that enforce the chair tiling substitution structure and these tiles have been modified to a simple aperiodic set of tiles using matching rules enforcing the same structure. Barge et al. have computed the Čech cohomology of the chair tiling and it has been shown that chair tilings can also be obtained via a cut-and-project scheme.
