= Aperiodic set of prototiles =

Set of tile shapes that can create nonrepeating patterns

Click "show" for description. A periodic tiling with a fundamental unit (triangle) and a primitive cell (hexagon) highlighted. A tiling of the entire plane can be generated by fitting copies of these triangular patches together. To do this, the basic triangle must be rotated 60 degrees to fit edge-to-edge to a neighboring triangle. Thus a triangular tiling of fundamental units is generated that is mutually locally derivable from the tiling by the colored tiles. The other figure drawn onto the tiling, the white hexagon, represents a primitive cell of the tiling. Copies of the corresponding patch of coloured tiles can be translated to form an infinite tiling of the plane. It is not necessary to rotate this patch to achieve this.

The Penrose tiles are an aperiodic set of tiles, since they admit only non-periodic tilings of the plane (see next image).

All of the infinitely many tilings by the Penrose tiles are aperiodic. That is, the Penrose tiles are an aperiodic set of prototiles.

A set of prototiles is aperiodic if copies of the prototiles can be assembled to create tilings, such that all possible tessellation patterns are non-periodic. The aperiodicity referred to is a property of the particular set of prototiles; the various resulting tilings themselves are just non-periodic.

A given set of tiles, in the Euclidean plane or some other geometric setting, admits a tiling if non-overlapping copies of the tiles in the set can be fitted together to cover the entire space. A given set of tiles might admit periodic tilings — that is, tilings that remain invariant after being shifted by a translation (for example, a lattice of square tiles is periodic). It is not difficult to design a set of tiles that admits non-periodic tilings as well as periodic tilings. (For example, randomly arranged tilings using a 2×2 square and 2×1 rectangle are typically non-periodic.)

However, an aperiodic set of tiles can only produce non-periodic tilings. Infinitely many distinct tilings may be obtained from a single aperiodic set of tiles.

The best-known examples of an aperiodic set of tiles are the various Penrose tiles. The known aperiodic sets of prototiles are seen on the list of aperiodic sets of tiles. The underlying undecidability of the domino problem implies that there exists no systematic procedure for deciding whether a given set of tiles can tile the plane.

== History ==
Polygons are plane figures bounded by straight line segments. Regular polygons have all sides of equal length as well as all angles of equal measure. As early as AD 325, Pappus of Alexandria knew that only 3 types of regular polygons (the square, equilateral triangle, and hexagon) can fit perfectly together in repeating tessellations on a Euclidean plane. Within that plane, every triangle, irrespective of regularity, will tessellate. In contrast, regular pentagons do not tessellate. However, irregular pentagons, with different sides and angles can tessellate. There are 15 irregular convex pentagons that tile the plane.

Polyhedra are the three dimensional correlates of polygons. They are built from flat faces and straight edges and have sharp corner turns at the vertices. Although a cube is the only regular polyhedron that admits of tessellation, many non-regular 3-dimensional shapes can tessellate, such as the truncated octahedron.

The second part of Hilbert's eighteenth problem asked for a single polyhedron tiling Euclidean 3-space, such that no tiling by it is isohedral (an anisohedral tile). The problem as stated was solved by Karl Reinhardt in 1928, but sets of aperiodic tiles have been considered as a natural extension. The specific question of aperiodic sets of tiles first arose in 1961, when logician Hao Wang tried to determine whether the Domino Problem is decidable — that is, whether there exists an algorithm for deciding if a given finite set of prototiles admits a tiling of the plane. Wang found algorithms to enumerate the tilesets that cannot tile the plane, and the tilesets that tile it periodically; by this he showed that such a decision algorithm exists if every finite set of prototiles that admits a tiling of the plane also admits a periodic tiling.

These Wang tiles yield only non-periodic tilings of the plane, and so are aperiodic.

Hence, when in 1966 Robert Berger found an aperiodic set of prototiles this demonstrated that the tiling problem is in fact not decidable. (Thus Wang's procedures do not work on all tile sets, although that does not render them useless for practical purposes.) This first such set, used by Berger in his proof of undecidability, required 20,426 Wang tiles. Berger later reduced his set to 104, and Hans Läuchli subsequently found an aperiodic set requiring only 40 Wang tiles. The set of 13 tiles given in the illustration on the right is an aperiodic set published by Karel Culik, II, in 1996.

However, a smaller aperiodic set, of six non-Wang tiles, was discovered by Raphael M. Robinson in 1971. Roger Penrose discovered three more sets in 1973 and 1974, reducing the number of tiles needed to two, and Robert Ammann discovered several new sets in 1977. The question of whether an aperiodic set exists with only a single prototile is known as the einstein problem, and was solved by amateur mathematician David Smith in 2022.

== Constructions ==
There are few constructions of aperiodic tilings known, even forty years after Berger's groundbreaking construction. Some constructions are of infinite families of aperiodic sets of tiles. Those constructions that have been found are mostly constructed in one of a few ways—primarily by forcing some sort of non-periodic hierarchical structure. Despite this, the undecidability of the Domino Problem ensures that there must be infinitely many distinct principles of construction, and that in fact, there exist aperiodic sets of tiles for which there can be no proof of their aperiodicity.

There can be no aperiodic set of tiles in one dimension: every set of tiles in the line either cannot form a complete tiling, or can form a periodic tiling. Aperiodicity of prototiles requires two or more dimensions.
