= Voderberg tiling =

Mathematical spiral tiling

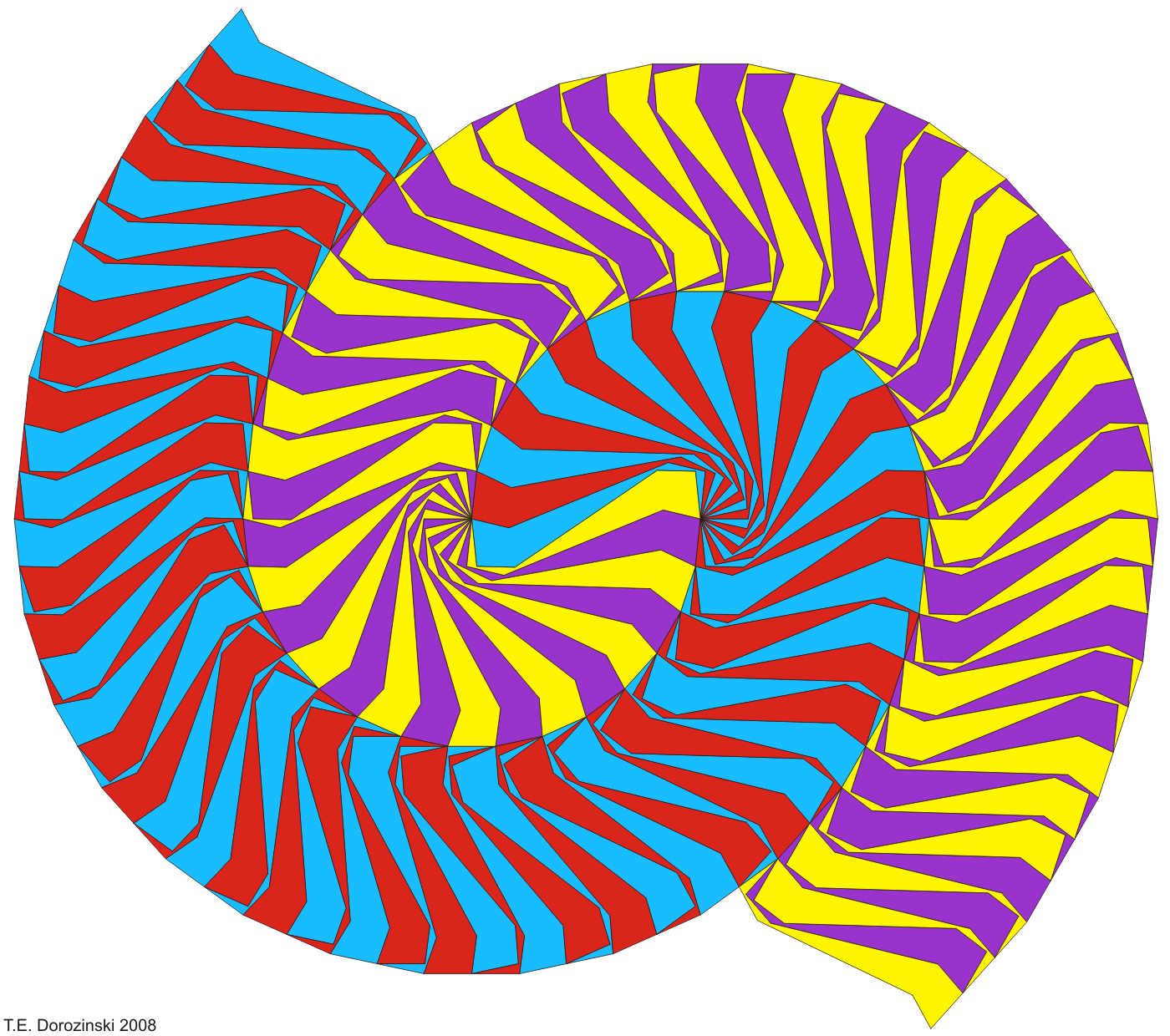
A partial Voderberg tiling. Note that all of the colored tiles are congruent.

Voderberg tiling is a mathematical spiral tiling, invented in 1936 by mathematician Heinz Voderberg (1911–1945). Karl August Reinhardt posed the question, "Is there a tile such that two copies can completely enclose a third copy?" Voderberg, his student, answered in the affirmative with Form eines Neunecks eine Lösung zu einem Problem von Reinhardt ["On a nonagon as a solution to a problem of Reinhardt"].

Voderberg tiling is monohedral, consisting of a single shape that tessellates the plane with congruent copies of itself. In this case, the prototile is an elongated irregular nonagon, or nine-sided figure. The most interesting feature of this polygon is the fact that two copies of it can fully enclose a third one. For example, the lowest purple nonagon is enclosed by two yellow ones, all three of identical shape. Before Voderberg's discovery, mathematicians had questioned whether this could be possible.

Because it has no translational symmetries, Voderberg tiling is technically non-periodic, even though it exhibits an obvious repeating pattern and its prototile can also be used to create a periodic tiling.

Vorderberg tiling was the first spiral tiling to be devised, preceding later work by Branko Grünbaum and Geoffrey C. Shephard in the 1970s.

A spiral tiling is depicted on the cover of Grünbaum and Shephard's 1987 book Tilings and patterns.
