= Socolar tiling =

Non-periodic tiling of the plane

A Socolar tiling is an example of an aperiodic tiling, developed in 1989 by Joshua Socolar in the exploration of quasicrystals. There are 3 tiles a 30° rhombus, square, and regular hexagon. The 12-fold symmetry set exist similar to the 10-fold Penrose rhombic tilings, and 8-fold Ammann–Beenker tilings.

The 12-fold tiles easily tile periodically, so special rules are defined to limit their connections and force nonperiodic tilings. The rhombus and square are disallowed from touching another of itself, while the hexagon can connect to both tiles as well as itself, but only in alternate edges.

There are 3 Socolar tiles: a 30° rhombus, square, and a regular hexagon with tiling rules defined by the fins.

The rules of tiling can fill a regular dodecagon.

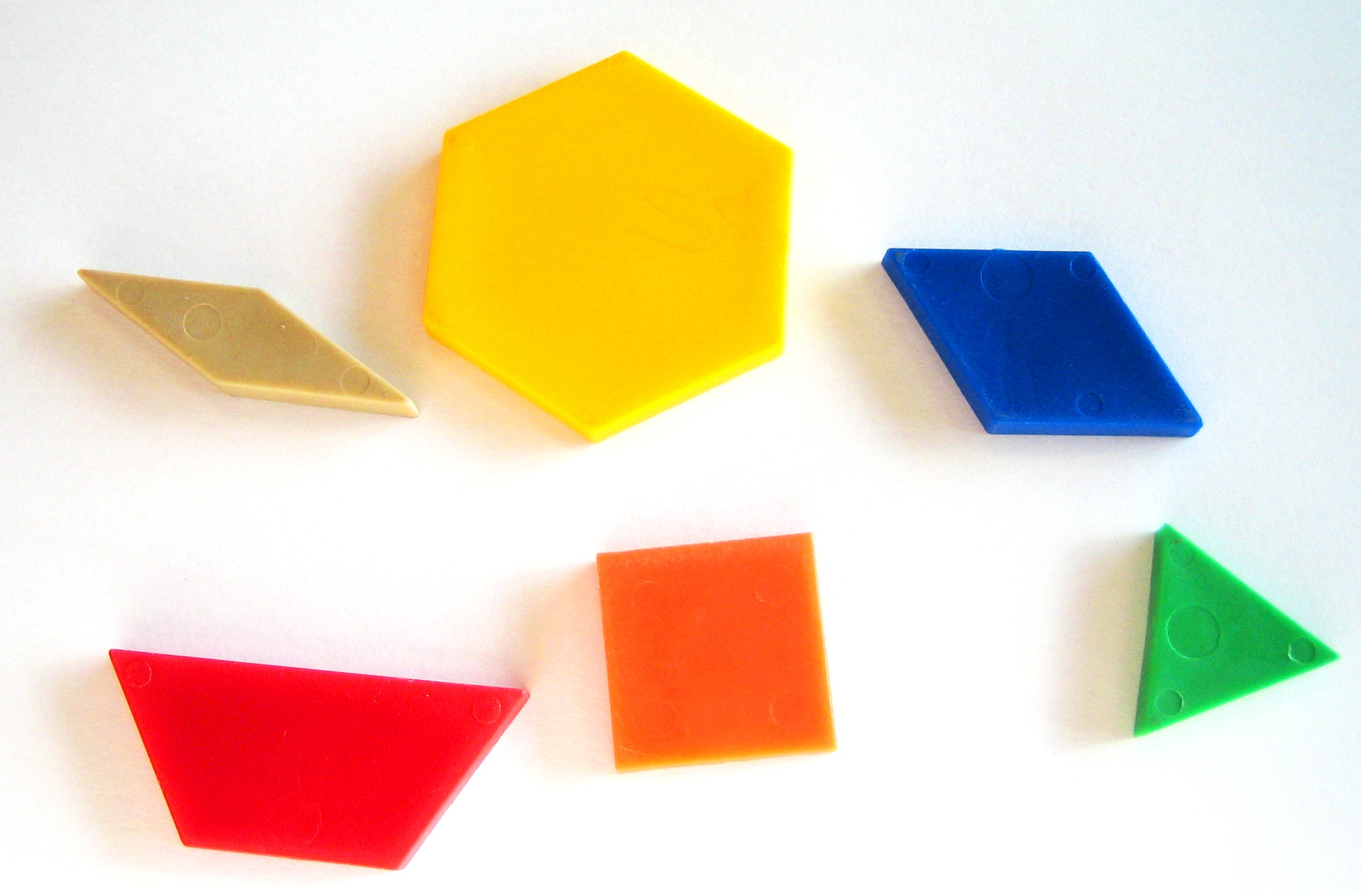
Pattern blocks contain the 3 tiles and 3 more.

== Dodecagonal rhomb tiling ==
The dodecagonal rhomb tiling include three tiles, a 30° rhombus, a 60° rhombus, and a square. Another set includes a square, a 30° rhombus and an equilateral triangle.

== See also ==
- Pattern block - 6 tiles based on 12-fold symmetry, including the 3 Socolar tiles
- Socolar–Taylor tile - A different tiling named after Socolar
