= The Symmetries of Things =

2016 book by John Horton Conway, Heidi Burgiel, and Chaim Goodman-Strauss

- Author: John Horton Conway, Heidi Burgiel, and Chaim Goodman-Strauss
- Language: English
- Subject: Mathematical symmetry
- Genre: Mathematics
- Publication date: 2008
- ISBN: 978-1568812205

The Symmetries of Things is a book on mathematical symmetry and the symmetries of geometric objects, aimed at audiences of multiple levels. It was written over the course of many years by John Horton Conway, Heidi Burgiel, and Chaim Goodman-Strauss, and published in 2008 by A K Peters. Its critical reception was mixed, with some reviewers praising it for its accessible and thorough approach to its material and for its many inspiring illustrations, and others complaining about its inconsistent level of difficulty, overuse of neologisms, failure to adequately cite prior work, and technical errors.

== Topics ==
The Symmetries of Things has three major sections, subdivided into 26 chapters. The first of the sections discusses the symmetries of geometric objects. It includes both the symmetries of finite objects in two and three dimensions, and two-dimensional infinite structures such as frieze patterns and tessellations, and develops a new notation for these symmetries based on work of Alexander Murray MacBeath that, as proven by the authors using a simplified form of the Riemann–Hurwitz formula, covers all possibilities. Other topics include Euler's polyhedral formula and the classification of two-dimensional surfaces. It is heavily illustrated with both artworks and objects depicting these symmetries, such as the art of M. C. Escher and Bathsheba Grossman, as well as new illustrations created by the authors using custom software.

The second section of the book considers symmetries more abstractly and combinatorially, considering both the color-preserving symmetries of colored objects, the symmetries of topological spaces described in terms of orbifolds, and abstract forms of symmetry described by group theory and presentations of groups. This section culminates with a classification of all of the finite groups with up to 2009 elements.

The third section of the book provides a classification of the three-dimensional space groups and examples of honeycombs such as the Weaire–Phelan structure. It also considers the symmetries of less familiar geometries: higher dimensional spaces, non-Euclidean spaces, and three-dimensional flat manifolds. Hyperbolic groups are used to provide a new explanation of the problem of hearing the shape of a drum. It includes the first published classification of four-dimensional convex uniform polytopes announced by Conway and Richard K. Guy in 1965, and a discussion of William Thurston's geometrization conjecture, proved by Grigori Perelman shortly before the publication of the book, according to which all three-dimensional manifolds can be realized as symmetric spaces. One omission lamented by Jaron Lanier is the set of regular projective polytopes such as the 11-cell.

== Audience and reception ==
Reviewer Darren Glass writes that different parts of the book are aimed at different audiences, resulting in "a wonderful book which can be appreciated on many levels" and providing an unusual level of depth for a popular mathematics book. Its first section, on symmetries of low-dimensional Euclidean spaces, is suitable for a general audience. The second part involves some understanding of group theory, as would be expected of undergraduate mathematics students, and some additional familiarity with abstract algebra towards its end. And the third part, more technical, is primarily aimed at researchers in these topics, although much still remains accessible at the undergraduate level. It also has exercises making it useful as a textbook, and its heavy use of color illustration would make it suitable as a coffee table book. However, reviewer Robert Moyer finds fault with its choice to include material at significantly different levels of difficulty, writing that for most of its audience, too much of the book will be unreadable.

Much of the material in the book is either new, or previously known only through technical publications aimed at specialists, and much of the previously-known material that it presents is described in new notation and nomenclature. Although there are many other books on symmetry, reviewer N. G. Macleod writes that this one "may well become the definitive guide in this area for many years". Jaron Lanier calls it "a plaything, an inexhaustible exercise in brain expansion for the reader, a work of art and a bold statement of what the culture of math can be like", and "a masterpiece".

Despite these positive reviews, Branko Grünbaum, himself an authority on geometric symmetry, is much less enthusiastic, writing that the book has "some serious shortcomings". These include the unnecessary use of "cute" neologisms for concepts that already have well-established terminology, an inadequate treatment of MacBeath's and Andreas Dress's contributions to the book's notation, sloppy reasoning in some arguments, inaccurate claims of novelty and failure to credit previous work in the classification of colored plane patterns, missing cases in this classification, likely errors in other of the more technical parts, poor copyediting, and a lack of clear definitions that ends up leaving out such central notions as the symmetries of a circle without providing any explanation of why they were omitted.
