= Einstein problem =

Question about single-shape aperiodic tiling

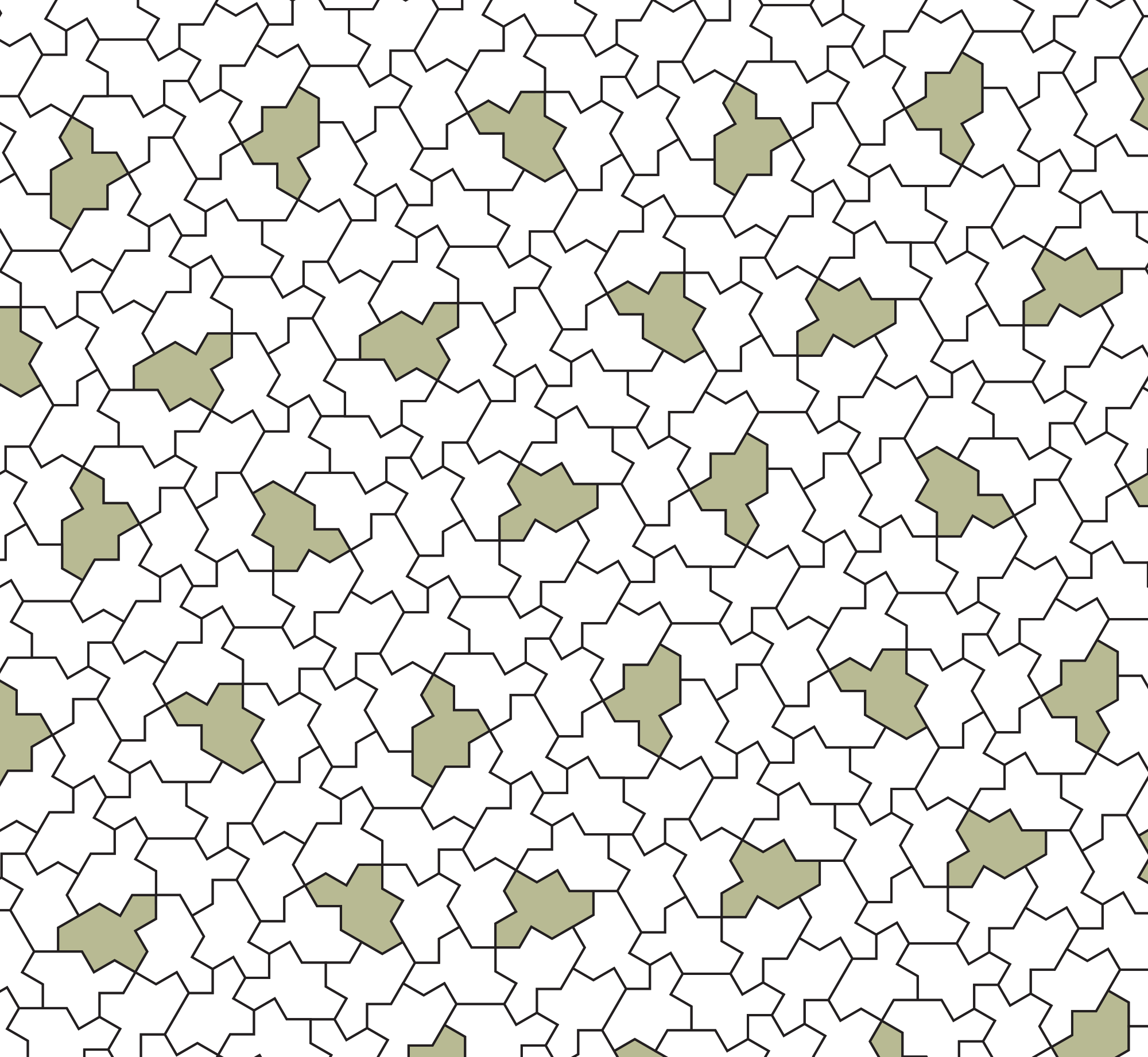
Aperiodic tiling with "Tile(1,1)", a type of the Spectre tiles. The tiles are colored according to their rotational orientation modulo 60 degrees. (Note: Two tiles have the same color when they can be brought in coincidence by the combination of a translation together with a rotation by an even multiple of 30 degrees. Tiles of different colors can be brought in coincidence by a translation together with a rotation by an odd multiple of 30 degrees.) (Smith, Myers, Kaplan, and Goodman-Strauss)

In plane discrete geometry, the einstein problem asks about the existence of a single prototile that by itself forms an aperiodic set of prototiles; that is, a shape that can tessellate space but only in a nonperiodic way. Such a shape is called an einstein, a word play on ein Stein, German for "one stone", and physicist Albert Einstein.

Several variants of the problem, depending on the particular definitions of nonperiodicity and the specifications of what sets may qualify as tiles and what types of matching rules are permitted, were solved beginning in the 1990s. The strictest version of the problem was solved in 2023, after an initial discovery in 2022.

The einstein problem can be seen as a natural extension of the second part of Hilbert's eighteenth problem, which asks for a single polyhedron that tiles Euclidean 3-space, but such that no tessellation by this polyhedron is isohedral. Such anisohedral tiles were found by Karl Reinhardt in 1928, but these anisohedral tiles all tile space periodically.

== Partial solutions ==
In 1988, Peter Schmitt discovered a single aperiodic prototile in three-dimensional Euclidean space. While no tiling by this prototile admits a translation as a symmetry, some have a screw symmetry. The screw operation involves a combination of a translation and a rotation through an irrational multiple of π, so no number of repeated operations ever yield a pure translation. This construction was subsequently extended by John Horton Conway and Ludwig Danzer to a convex aperiodic prototile, the Schmitt–Conway–Danzer tile. The presence of the screw symmetry resulted in a reevaluation of the requirements for non-periodicity. Chaim Goodman-Strauss suggested that a tiling be considered strongly aperiodic if it admits no infinite cyclic group of Euclidean motions as symmetries, and that only tile sets which enforce strong aperiodicity be called strongly aperiodic, while other sets are to be called weakly aperiodic.

The Socolar–Taylor tile was proposed in 2010 as a solution to the einstein problem, but this tile is not a connected set.

In 1996, Petra Gummelt constructed a decorated decagonal tile and showed that when two kinds of overlaps between pairs of tiles are allowed, the tiles can cover the plane, but only non-periodically. A tiling is usually understood to be a covering with no overlaps, and so the Gummelt tile is not considered an aperiodic prototile. An aperiodic tile set in the Euclidean plane that consists of just one tile (the Socolar–Taylor tile) was proposed in early 2010 by Joshua Socolar and Joan Taylor. This construction requires matching rules, rules that restrict the relative orientation of two tiles and that make reference to decorations drawn on the tiles, and these rules apply to pairs of nonadjacent tiles. Alternatively, an undecorated tile with no matching rules may be constructed, but the tile is not connected. The construction can be extended to a three-dimensional, connected tile with no matching rules, but this tile allows tilings that are periodic in one direction, and so it is only weakly aperiodic. Moreover, the tile is not simply connected.

== The hat and the spectre ==
The tiling discovered by David Smith

One of the infinite family of Smith–Myers–Kaplan–Goodman-Strauss tiles. Yellow tiles are the reflected versions of the blue tiles.

In November 2022, the amateur mathematician David Smith discovered a "hat"-shaped tile formed from eight copies of a 60°–90°–120°–90° kite (deltoidal trihexagonals), glued edge-to-edge, which seemed to only tile the plane aperiodically. Smith recruited mathematician Craig S. Kaplan, and subsequently Joseph Samuel Myers and Chaim Goodman-Strauss, and in March 2023 they posted a preprint proving that the "hat", when considered with its mirror image, forms an aperiodic prototile set. Furthermore, the hat can be generalized to an infinite family of tiles with the same aperiodic property. This result was formally published in the journal Combinatorial Theory in July 2024.

Tile(1,1) from Smith, Myers, Kaplan & Goodmann-Strauss on the left. A spectre is obtained by modifying the edges of this polygon as in the middle and right example.

In May 2023 they (Smith, Myers, Kaplan, and Goodman-Strauss) posted a new preprint about a family of shapes related to the "hat", called "spectres", each of which can tile the plane using only rotations and translations. Furthermore, the "spectre" is a "strictly chiral" aperiodic monotile: even with reflections, every tiling is non-periodic and uses only one chirality of the spectre. That is, there are no tilings of the plane that use both the spectre and its mirror.

In 2023, a public contest run by the National Museum of Mathematics in New York City and the United Kingdom Mathematics Trust in London asked people to submit creative renditions of the hat einstein. Out of over 245 submissions from 32 countries, three winners were chosen and received awards at a ceremony at the House of Commons.

== Applications ==
Einstein tiles' molecular analogs may be used to form chiral, two dimensional quasicrystals.

Macroscopic applications in engineering include honeycombs based on extrusions of the 2-dimensional hat tiling into 2.5 dimensional forms and composite materials using the hat tiling to create continuous ductile networks within a hard, brittle, matrix. The honeycombs are found to have zero Poisson's ratio for a wide range of relative densities and therefore for a range of values of elastic modulus. The composites offer increased stiffness alongside increased toughness when compared to similar composites with a hexagon-based network.

Applications of the infinite family of tiles, based on the hat, are also of interest. They are defined by a continuously varying geometry, which can give rise to continuously varying properties. For example, honeycombs based on this family demonstrate a continuously variable Poisson's ratio.

== See also ==
- Binary tiling, a weakly aperiodic tiling of the hyperbolic plane with a single tile
- Schmitt–Conway–Danzer tile, in three dimensions
