= Craig S. Kaplan =

Canadian computer scientist and mathematician

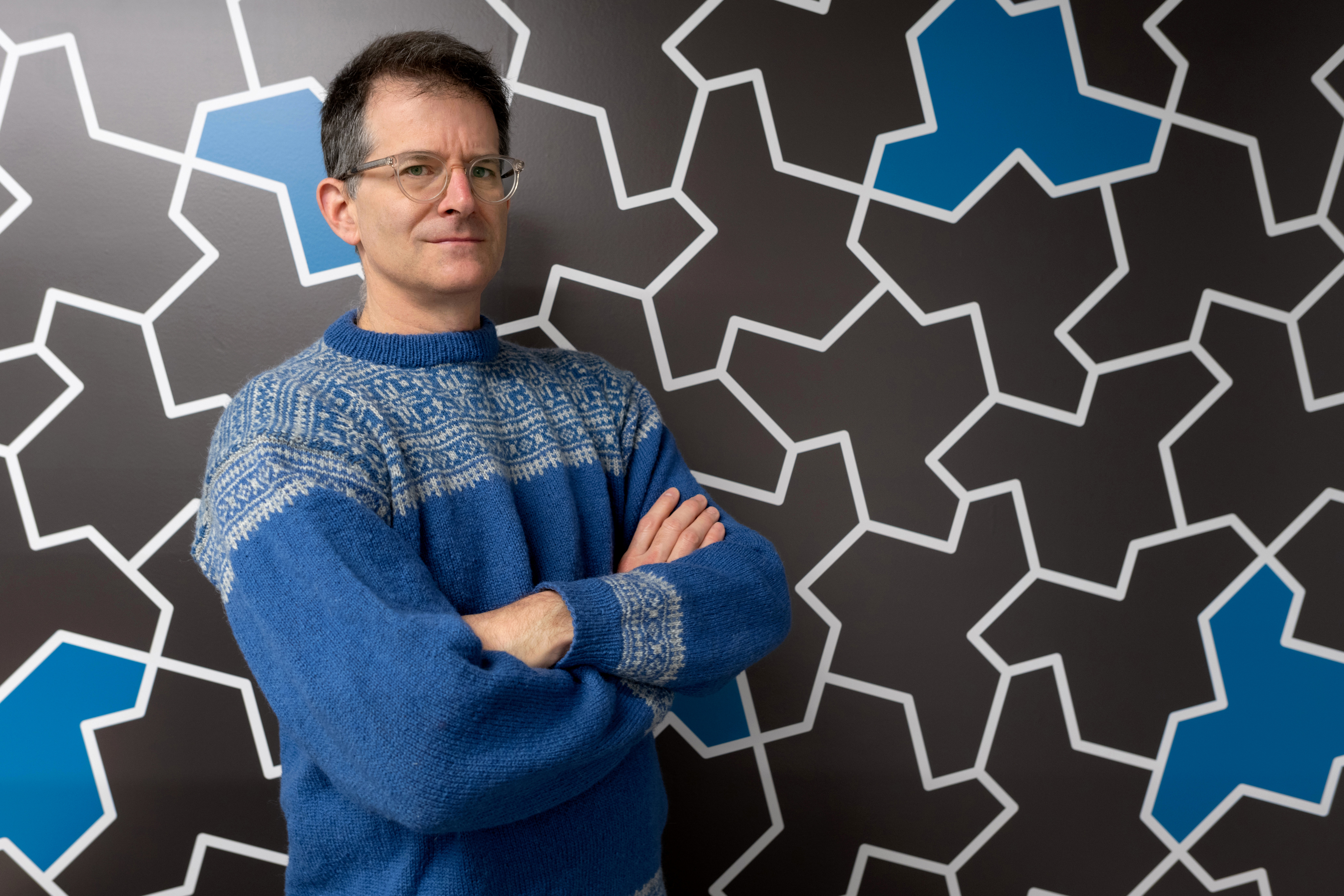
- Kaplan in front of a wall with the first aperiodic monotile
- Education: University of Waterloo (BMath), University of Washington (MSc, PhD)
- Known for: Einstein problem
- Scientific career
- Fields: Mathematics, Computer Science
- Workplaces: University of Waterloo
- Website: https://isohedral.ca/

Craig S. Kaplan is a Canadian computer scientist, mathematician, and mathematical artist. He is an editor of the Journal of Mathematics and the Arts (formerly chief editor), and an organizer of the Bridges Conference on mathematics and art. He is a professor of computer science at the University of Waterloo, Canada.

Kaplan's work primarily focuses on applications of geometry and computer science to visual art and design. He was part of the team that proved that the tile discovered by hobbyist David Smith is a solution to the einstein problem, a single shape which aperiodically tiles the plane but cannot do so periodically.

== Education ==
Kaplan received a BMath from the University of Waterloo in 1996. He went on to receive MSc and PhD degrees in computer science from University of Washington in 1998 and 2002, respectively.

== Work ==
Kaplan's research work focuses on the application of computer graphics and mathematics in art and design. He is an expert on computational applications of tiling theory.

=== Exotic geometries in protein assembly ===
In 2019, Kaplan helped to apply the concepts of Archimedean solids to protein assembly, and together with an experimental team at RIKEN demonstrated that these exotic geometries lead to ultra-stable macromolecular cages. These new systems could have applications in targeted drug delivery systems or the design of new materials at the nanoscale.

=== Einstein problem ===
One of the infinite family of Smith–Myers–Kaplan–Goodman-Strauss tiles, found in March 2023.

In 2023, Kaplan was part of the team that solved the einstein problem, a major open problem in tiling theory and Euclidean geometry. The problem is to find an "aperiodic monotile", a single geometric shape which can tesselate the plane aperiodically (without translational symmetry) but which cannot do so periodically. The discovery is under professional review and, upon confirmation, will be credited as solving a longstanding mathematical problem.

In 2022, hobbyist David Smith discovered a shape constructed by gluing together eight kites (in this case, each kite is a sixth of a regular hexagon) which seemed from Smith's experiments to tile the plane but would not do so periodically. He contacted Kaplan for help analyzing the shape, which the two named the "hat". After Kaplan's computational tools also found the tiling to continue indefinitely, Kaplan and Smith recruited two other mathematicians, Joseph Samuel Myers and Chaim Goodman-Strauss to help prove they had found an aperiodic monotile. Smith also found a second tile, dubbed the "turtle", which seemed to have the same properties. In March 2023, the team of four announced their proof that the hat and turtle tiles, as well as an infinite family of other tiles interpolating the two, are aperiodic monotiles.

Both the hat and turtle tiles require some reflected copies to tile the plane. After the initial preprint, Smith noticed that a tile related to the hat tile could tile the plane either periodically or aperiodically, with the aperiodic tiling not requiring reflections. A suitable manipulation of the edge prevents the periodic tiling. In May 2023 the team of Smith, Kaplan, Myers, and Goodman-Strauss posted a new preprint proving that the new shape, which Smith called a "spectre", is a strictly chiral aperiodic monotile: even if reflections are allowed, every tiling is non-periodic and uses only one chirality of the spectre. This new shape tiles a plane in a pattern that never repeats without the use of mirror images of the shape, hence been called a "vampire einstein".

== Honors and awards ==
Kaplan was elected an ACM Distinguished Member in 2025.
