= David Smith (amateur mathematician) =

Tiling hobbyist

The tiling discovered by David Smith

David Smith is an amateur mathematician and retired print technician from Bridlington, Yorkshire, England, who is best known for his discoveries related to aperiodic monotiles that helped to solve the einstein problem.

== Einstein tile ==
=== Initial discovery ===
Smith discovered a 13-sided polygon in November 2022 whilst using a software package called PolyForm Puzzle Solver to experiment with different shapes. After further experimentation using cardboard cut-outs, he realised that the shape appeared to tessellate but seemingly without ever achieving a regular pattern.

=== Contacting experts ===
Smith contacted Craig S. Kaplan from the University of Waterloo to alert him to this potential discovery of an aperiodic monotile. They nicknamed the newly discovered shape "the hat", because of its resemblance to a fedora. Kaplan proceeded to further inspect the polykite shape. During this time, Smith informed Kaplan that he had discovered yet another shape, which he nicknamed "the turtle", that appeared to have the same aperiodic tiling properties.

By mid-January 2023, Kaplan enlisted software developer Joseph Samuel Myers from Cambridge and mathematician Chaim Goodman-Strauss from the University of Arkansas in order to help complete the proof. Myers realised that "the hat" and "the turtle" were in fact a part of the same continuum of shapes, which possessed the same aperiodic tiling properties but with sides of varying lengths.

=== Publication and further proofs ===
The team published their proofs in a preprint paper called 'An aperiodic monotile' in March 2023.

Smith emailed Kaplan less than a week after posting of their preprint informing him of the apparent properties of a new shape. This shape, nicknamed "the spectre", was found at the midpoint of the team's spectrum of shapes published in their paper. It was an anomaly within the spectrum of shapes as it produced a periodic pattern when tiled with its reflection. However, Smith had discovered that it would produce an aperiodic pattern when tiled without its reflection.

The team worked on a proof that confirmed the chiral aperiodic tiling property of "the spectre" and published a preprint paper in May 2023.

In 2024, their results were published in consecutive issues of Combinatorial Theory.
