= Socolar–Taylor tile =

Aperiodic tile

A patch of 25 monotiles, showing the triangular hierarchical structure

The Socolar–Taylor tile is a single non-connected tile which is aperiodic on the Euclidean plane, meaning that it admits only non-periodic tilings of the plane (due to the Sierpinski's triangle-like tiling that occurs), with rotations and reflections of the tile allowed. It is the first known example of a single aperiodic tile, or "einstein". The basic version of the tile is a simple hexagon, with printed designs to enforce a local matching rule, regarding how the tiles may be placed. One of their papers shows a realization of the tile as a connected set. It is currently unknown whether this rule may be geometrically implemented in two dimensions while keeping the tile a simply connected set.

This is, however, confirmed to be possible in three dimensions, and, in their original paper, Socolar and Taylor suggest a three-dimensional analogue to the monotile. Taylor and Socolar remark that the 3D monotile aperiodically tiles three-dimensional space. However the tile does allow tilings with a period, shifting one (non-periodic) two dimensional layer to the next, and so the tile is only "weakly aperiodic".

Physical copies of the three-dimensional tile could not be fitted together without allowing reflections, which would require access to four-dimensional space.

== Gallery ==
The monotile implemented geometrically. Black lines are included to show how the structure is enforced.

A connected version of the monotile (in black) and six of its neighbours.

A three-dimensional analogue of the Socolar-Taylor tile (all matching rules implemented geometrically)
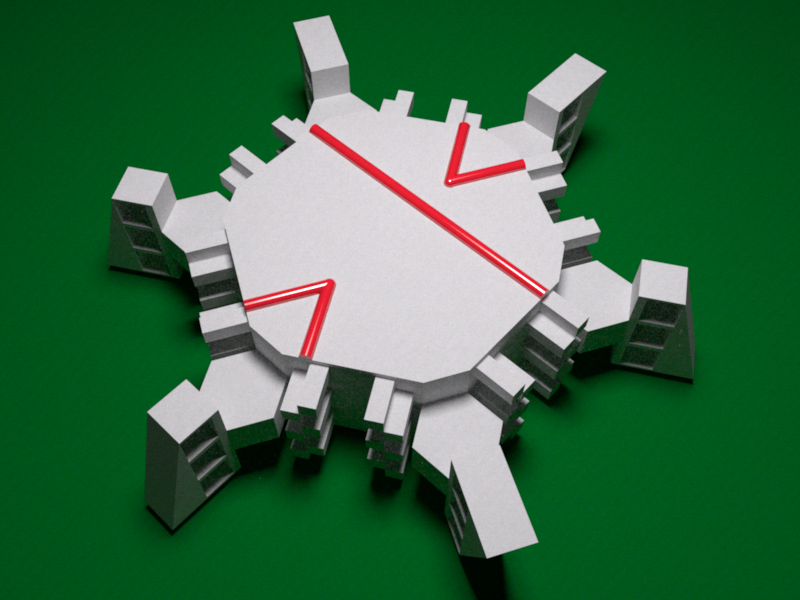
A three-dimensional analogue of the monotile, with matching rules implemented geometrically. Red lines are included only to illuminate the structure of the tiling. Note that this shape remains a connected set.

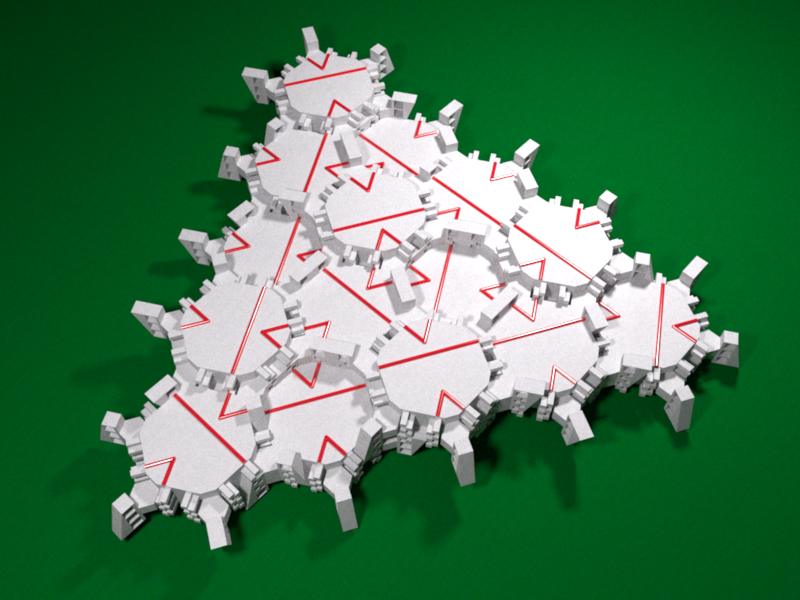
A partial tiling of three-dimensional space with the 3D monotile.

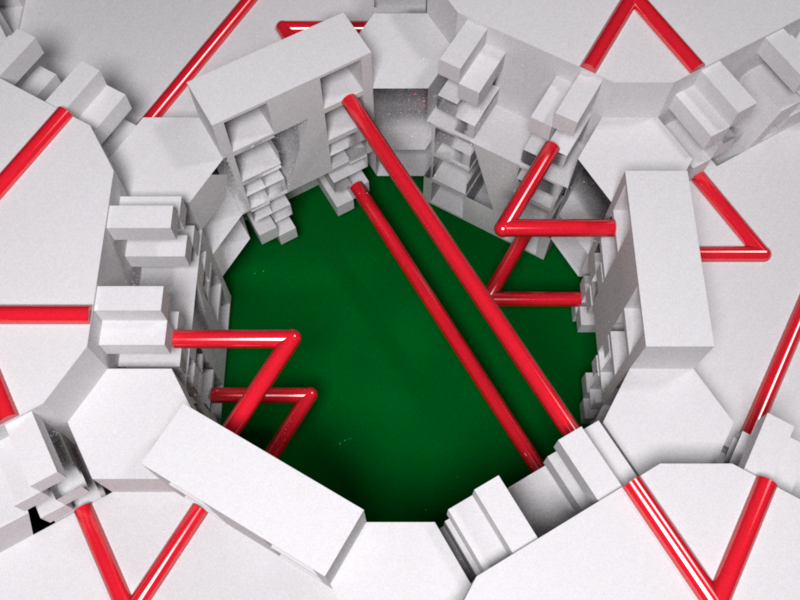
A tiling of 3D space with one tile removed to demonstrate the structure.
