= Anisohedral tiling =

Tiling forced to use inequivalent tile placements

A partial tiling of the plane by Heesch's anisohedral tile. There are two symmetry classes of tiles, one containing the blue and green tiles and the other containing the red and yellow tiles. As Heesch proved, this tile cannot tile the plane with only one symmetry class.

In geometry, a shape is said to be anisohedral if it admits a tiling, but no such tiling is isohedral (tile-transitive); that is, in any tiling by that shape there are two tiles that are not equivalent under any symmetry of the tiling. A tiling by an anisohedral tile is referred to as an anisohedral tiling.

== Existence ==
The first part of Hilbert's eighteenth problem asked whether there exists an anisohedral polyhedron in Euclidean 3-space; Grünbaum and Shephard suggest that Hilbert was assuming that no such tile existed in the plane.

Reinhardt answered Hilbert's problem in 1928 by finding examples of such polyhedra, and asserted that his proof that no such tiles exist in the plane would appear soon. However, Heesch then gave an example of an anisohedral tile in the plane in 1935.

== Convex tiles ==
Reinhardt had previously considered the question of anisohedral convex polygons, showing that there were no anisohedral convex hexagons but being unable to show there were no such convex pentagons, while finding the five types of convex pentagon tiling the plane isohedrally. Kershner gave three types of anisohedral convex pentagon in 1968; one of these tiles using only direct isometries without reflections or glide reflections, so answering a question of Heesch.

== Isohedral numbers ==
The 10-anisohedral tile given by Myers

The problem of anisohedral tiling has been generalised by saying that the isohedral number of a tile is the lowest number orbits (equivalence classes) of tiles in any tiling of that tile under the action of the symmetry group of that tiling, and that a tile with isohedral number k is k-anisohedral. Berglund asked whether there exist k-anisohedral tiles for all k, giving examples for k ≤ 4 (examples of 2-anisohedral and 3-anisohedral tiles being previously known, while the 4-anisohedral tile given was the first such published tile). Goodman-Strauss considered this in the context of general questions about how complex the behaviour of a given tile or set of tiles can be, noting a 10-anisohedral example of Myers. Grünbaum and Shephard had previously raised a slight variation on the same question.

Socolar showed in 2007 that arbitrarily high isohedral numbers can be achieved in two dimensions if the tile is disconnected, or has coloured edges with constraints on what colours can be adjacent, and in three dimensions with a connected tile without colours, noting that in two dimensions for a connected tile without colours the highest known isohedral number is 10.

Joseph Myers has produced a collection of tiles with high isohedral numbers, particularly a polyhexagon with isohedral number 10 (occurring in 20 orbits under translation) and another with isohedral number 9 (occurring in 36 orbits under translation).
