= Chaim Goodman-Strauss =

American mathematician

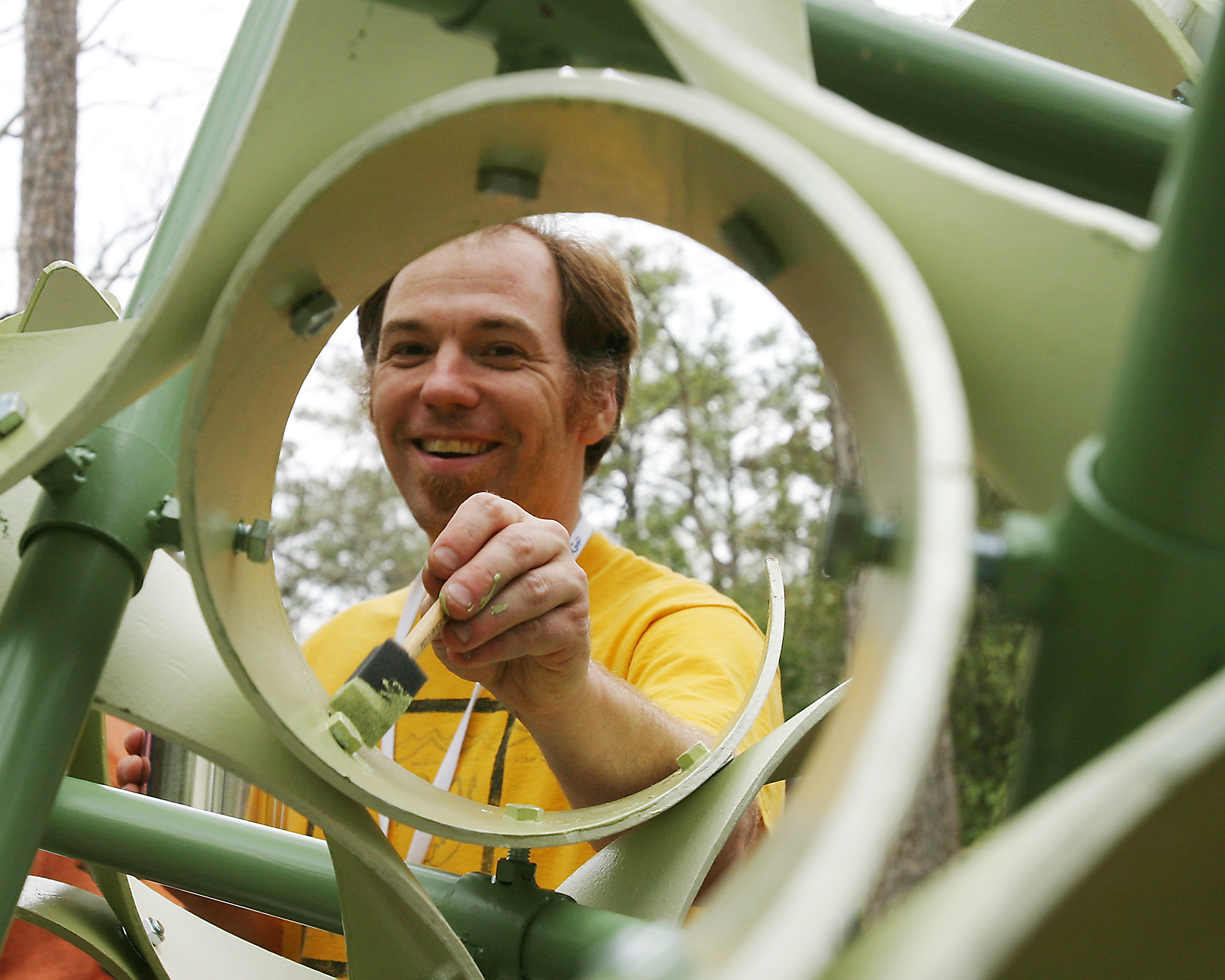
Chaim Goodman-Strauss assembling sculpture at Gathering 4 Gardner, Atlanta, GA, 2008.

Chaim Goodman-Strauss (born June 22, 1967 in Austin, Texas) is an American mathematician who works in convex geometry, especially aperiodic tiling. He retired from the faculty of the University of Arkansas and currently serves as outreach mathematician for the National Museum of Mathematics. He is co-author with John H. Conway and Heidi Burgiel of The Symmetries of Things, a comprehensive book surveying the mathematical theory of patterns.

== Education and career ==
Goodman-Strauss received both his B.S. (1988) and Ph.D. (1994) in mathematics from the University of Texas at Austin. His doctoral advisor was John Edwin Luecke. He joined the faculty at the University of Arkansas, Fayetteville (UA) in 1994 and served as departmental chair from 2008 to 2015. He held visiting positions at the National Autonomous University of Mexico and Princeton University.

During 1995 he did research at The Geometry Center, a mathematics research and education center at the University of Minnesota, where he investigated aperiodic tilings of the plane.

Goodman-Strauss has been fascinated by patterns and mathematical paradoxes for as long as he can remember. He attended a lecture about the mathematician Georg Cantor when he was 17 and says, "I was already doomed to be a mathematician, but that lecture sealed my fate." He became a mathematics writer and popularizer. From 2004 to 2012, in conjunction with KUAF 91.3 FM, the University of Arkansas NPR affiliate, he presented "The Math Factor," a podcast website dealing with recreational mathematics. He is an admirer of Martin Gardner and is on the advisory council of Gathering 4 Gardner, an organization that celebrates the legacy of the famed mathematics popularizer and Scientific American columnist, and is active in the associated Celebration of Mind events. In 2022 Goodman-Strauss was awarded the National Museum of Mathematics' Rosenthal Prize, which recognizes innovation and inspiration in math teaching.

== Aperiodic monotiles ==
A tiling that does not repeat and uses only one shape, discovered by David Smith.

On Mar 20, 2023 Strauss, together with David Smith, Joseph Samuel Myers and Craig S. Kaplan, announced the proof that the tile discovered by David Smith is an aperiodic monotile, i.e., a solution to a longstanding open einstein problem. The team continues to refine this work.

== Mathematical artist ==
In 2008 Goodman-Strauss teamed up with J. H. Conway and Heidi Burgiel to write The Symmetries of Things, an exhaustive and reader-accessible overview of the mathematical theory of patterns. He produced hundreds of full-color images for this book using software that he developed for the purpose. The Mathematical Association of America said, "The first thing one notices when one picks up a copy … is that it is a beautiful book … filled with gorgeous color pictures … many of which were generated by Goodman-Strauss. Unlike some books which add in illustrations to keep the reader's attention, the pictures are genuinely essential to the topic of this book."

He also creates large-scale sculptures inspired by mathematics, and some of these have been featured at Gathering 4 Gardner conferences.

== Books ==
- 2008 The symmetries of things (with by John H. Conway and Heidi Burgiel). A. K. Peters, Wellesley, MA, 2008, ISBN 1568812205

== Papers ==
- "Matching Rules and Substitution Tilings", Annals of Mathematics, Second Series, Vol 147, Issue 1 (January 1998), pp. 181–223
- "A Small Aperiodic Set of Planar Tiles" European Journal of Combinatorics, Vol 20, Issue 5, (July 1999) pp. 375–384
- "Compass and Straightedge in the Poincaré Disk" American Mathematical Monthly Vol. 108 (January 2001), pp. 38–49
- "Can’t Decide? Undecide!" Notices of the American Mathematical Society Vol. 57 (March 2010), pp. 343–356
- "A strongly aperiodic set of tiles in the hyperbolic plane" Inventiones Mathematicae, Vol 159, Issue 1 (2005), pp. 119–132
- "Lots of Aperiodic Sets of Tiles", Journal of Combinatorial Theory, Series A, Vol 160 (November 2018), pp. 409–445
