= Tessellation =

Covering by shapes without overlaps or gaps

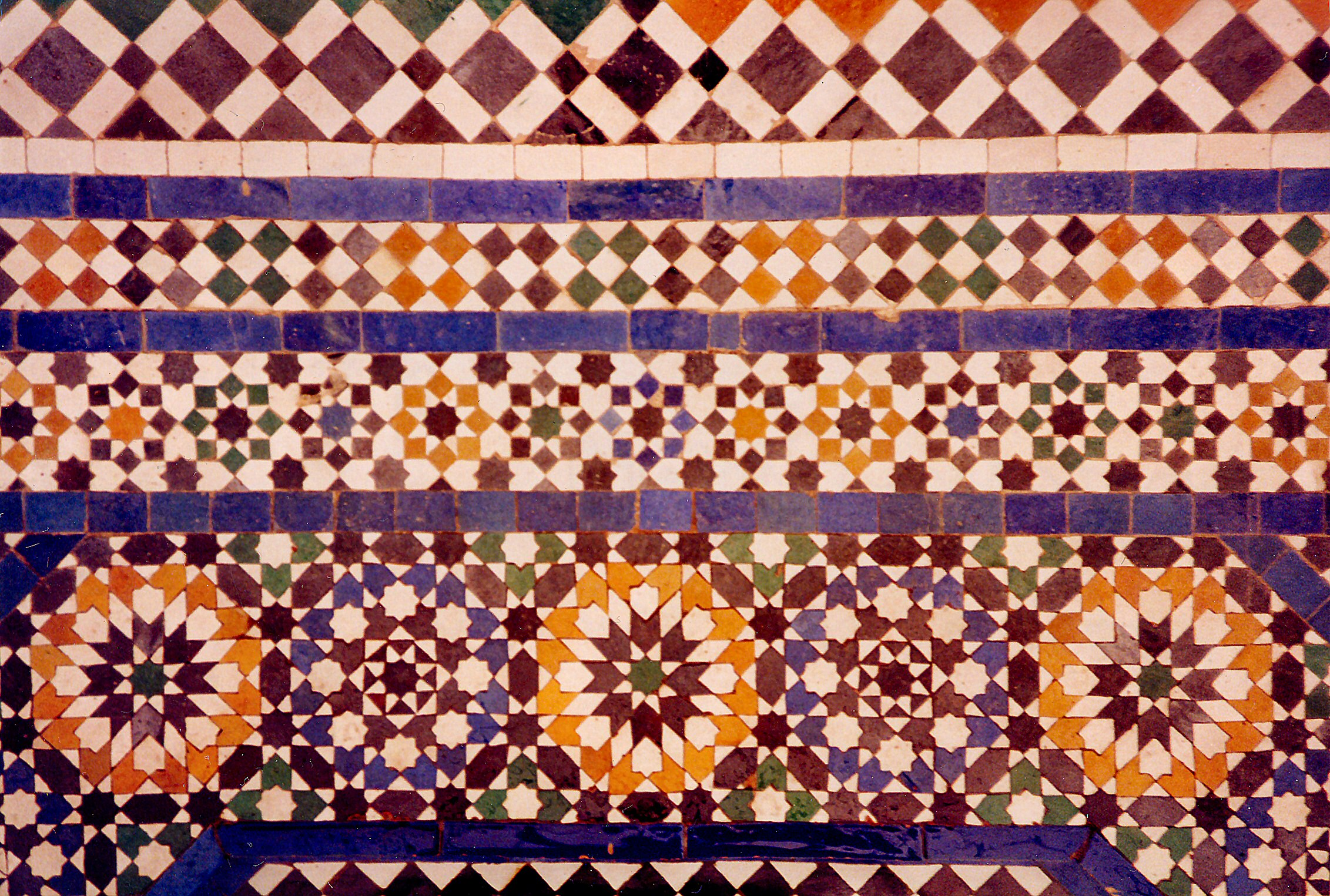
Zellige terracotta tiles in Marrakesh, forming edge‑to‑edge, regular and other tessellations

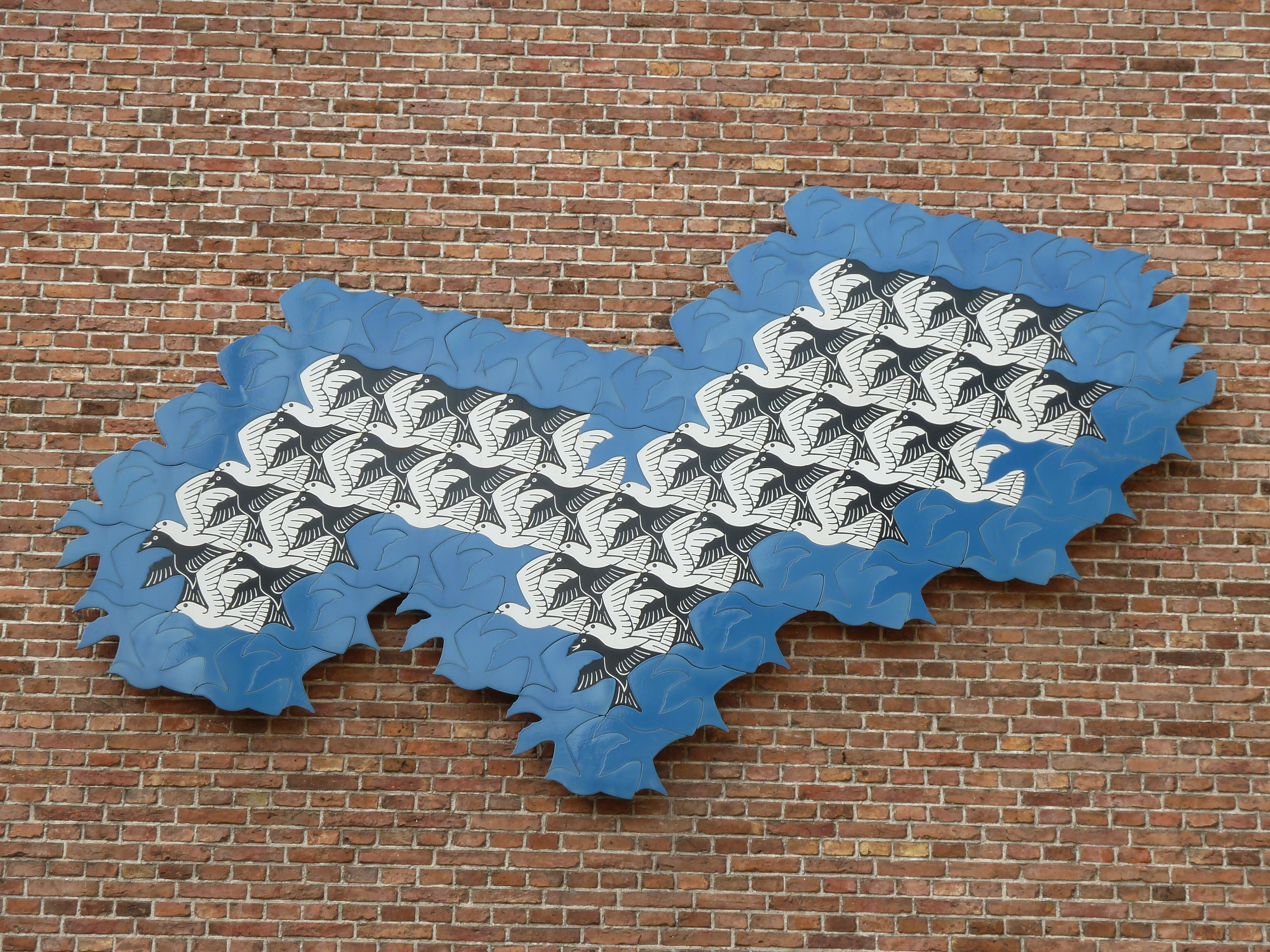
A wall sculpture in Leeuwarden celebrating the artistic tessellations of M. C. Escher

An example of non‑periodicity due to another orientation of one tile out of an infinite number of identical tiles

A tessellation or tiling is the covering of a surface, often a plane, using one or more geometric shapes, called tiles, with no overlaps and no gaps. In mathematics, tessellation can be generalized to higher dimensions and a variety of geometries.

A periodic tiling has a repeating pattern. Some special kinds include regular tilings with regular polygonal tiles all of the same shape, and semiregular tilings with regular tiles of more than one shape and with every corner identically arranged. The patterns formed by periodic tilings can be categorized into 17 wallpaper groups. A tiling that lacks a repeating pattern is called "non-periodic". An aperiodic tiling uses a small set of tile shapes that cannot form a repeating pattern (an aperiodic set of prototiles). A tessellation of space, also known as a space filling or honeycomb, can be defined in the geometry of higher dimensions.

A real physical tessellation is a tiling made of materials such as cemented ceramic squares or hexagons. Such tilings may be decorative patterns, or may have functions such as providing durable and water-resistant pavement, floor, or wall coverings. Historically, tessellations were used in Ancient Rome and in Islamic art such as in the Moroccan architecture and decorative geometric tiling of the Alhambra palace. In the twentieth century, the work of M. C. Escher often made use of tessellations, both in ordinary Euclidean geometry and in hyperbolic geometry, for artistic effect. Tessellations are sometimes employed for decorative effect in quilting. Tessellations form a class of patterns in nature, for example in the arrays of hexagonal cells found in honeycombs.

== History ==
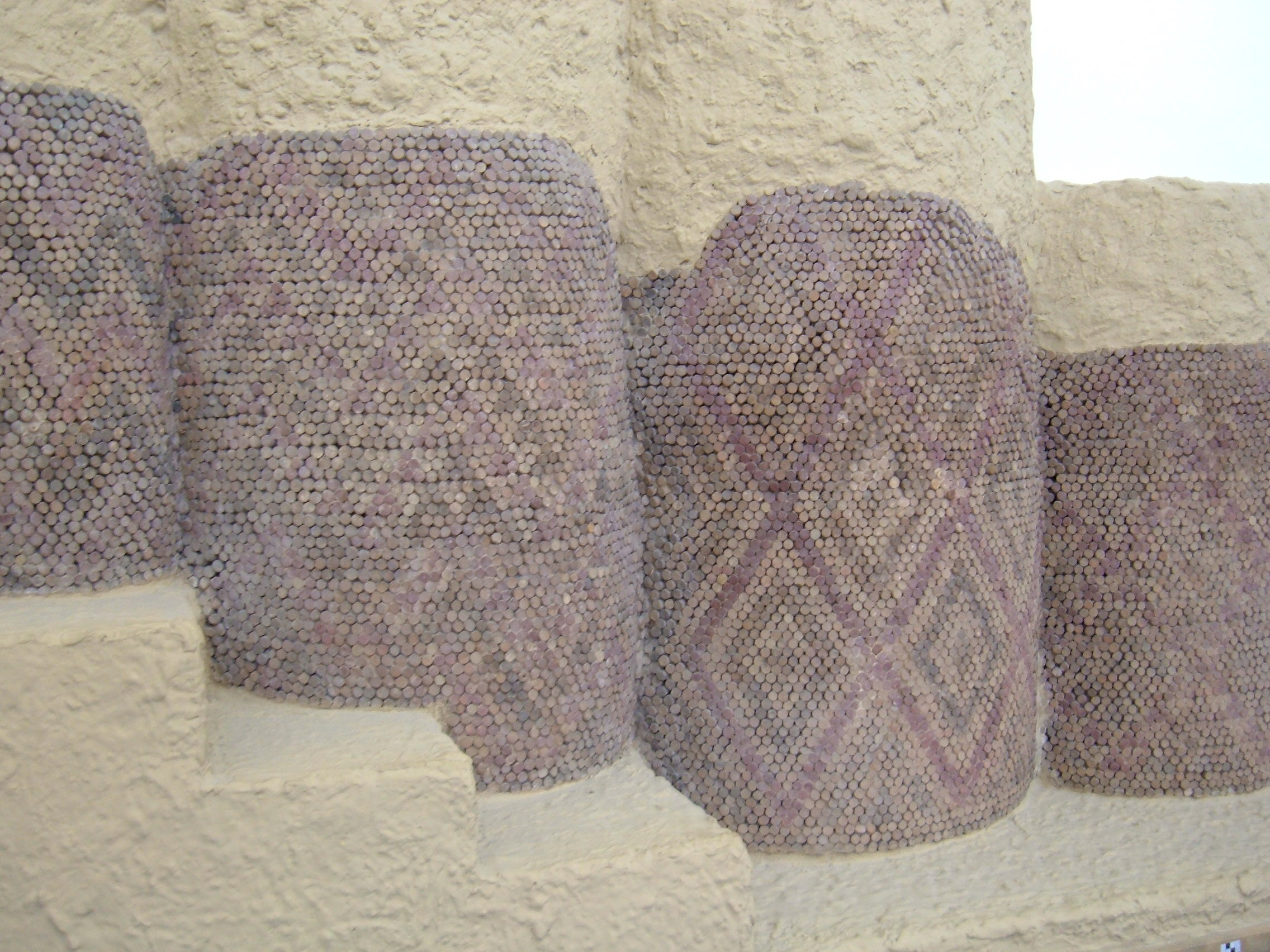
A temple mosaic from the ancient Sumerian city of Uruk IV (3400–3100 BC), showing a tessellation pattern in coloured tiles

Tessellations were used by the Sumerians (about 4000 BC) in building wall decorations formed by patterns of clay tiles.

Decorative mosaic tilings made of small squared blocks called tesserae were widely employed in classical antiquity, sometimes displaying geometric patterns.

In 1619, Johannes Kepler made an early documented study of tessellations. He wrote about regular and semiregular tessellations in his Harmonices Mundi; he was possibly the first to explore and to explain the hexagonal structures of honeycomb and snowflakes.

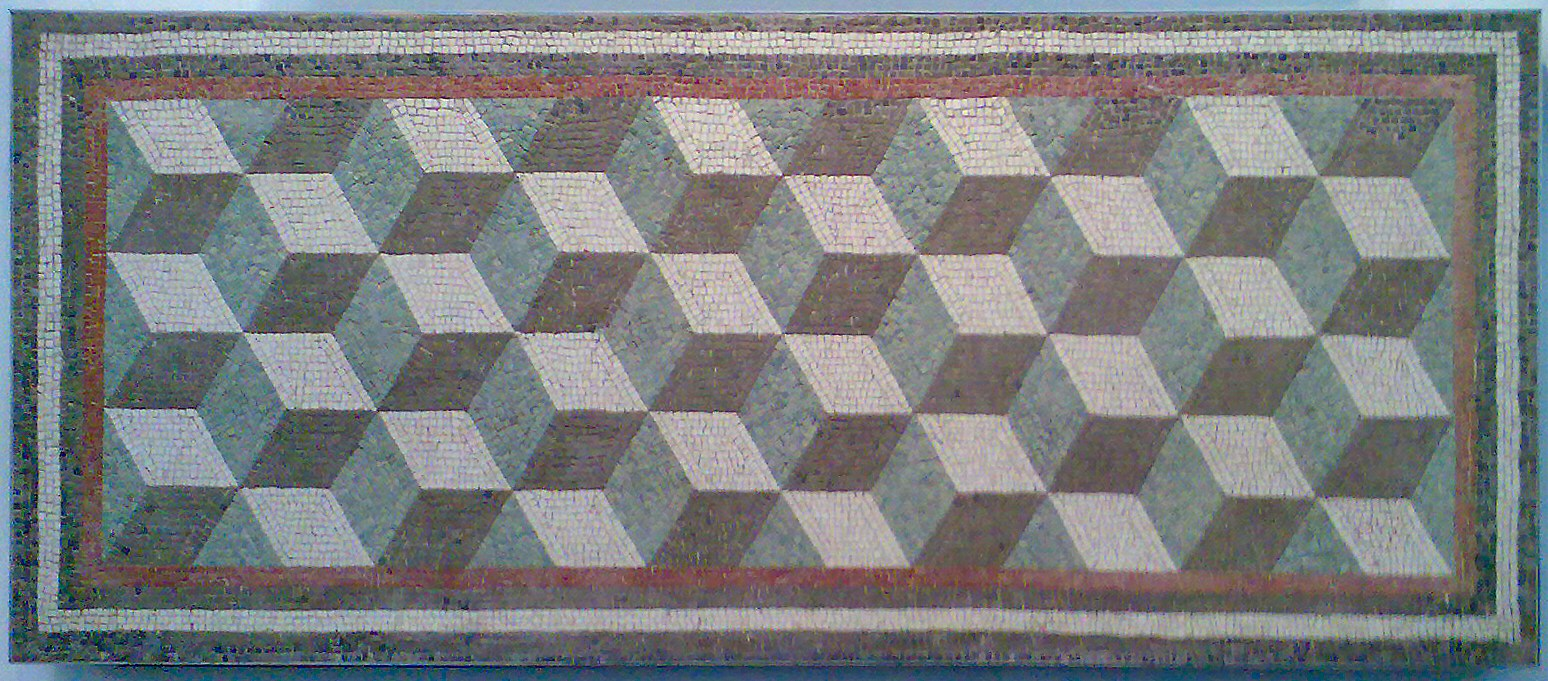
Roman rhombille mosaic

Some two hundred years later in 1891, the Russian crystallographer Yevgraf Fyodorov proved that every periodic tiling of the plane features one of seventeen different groups of isometries. Fyodorov's work marked the unofficial beginning of the mathematical study of tessellations. Other prominent contributors include Alexei Vasilievich Shubnikov and Nikolai Belov in their book Colored Symmetry (1964), and Heinrich Heesch and Otto Kienzle (1963).

== Etymology ==
In Latin, tessella is a small cubical piece of clay, stone, or glass used to make mosaics. The word "tessella" means "small square" (from tessera, square, which in turn is from the Greek word τέσσερα for four). It corresponds to the everyday term tiling, which refers to applications of tessellations, often made of glazed clay.

== Overview ==
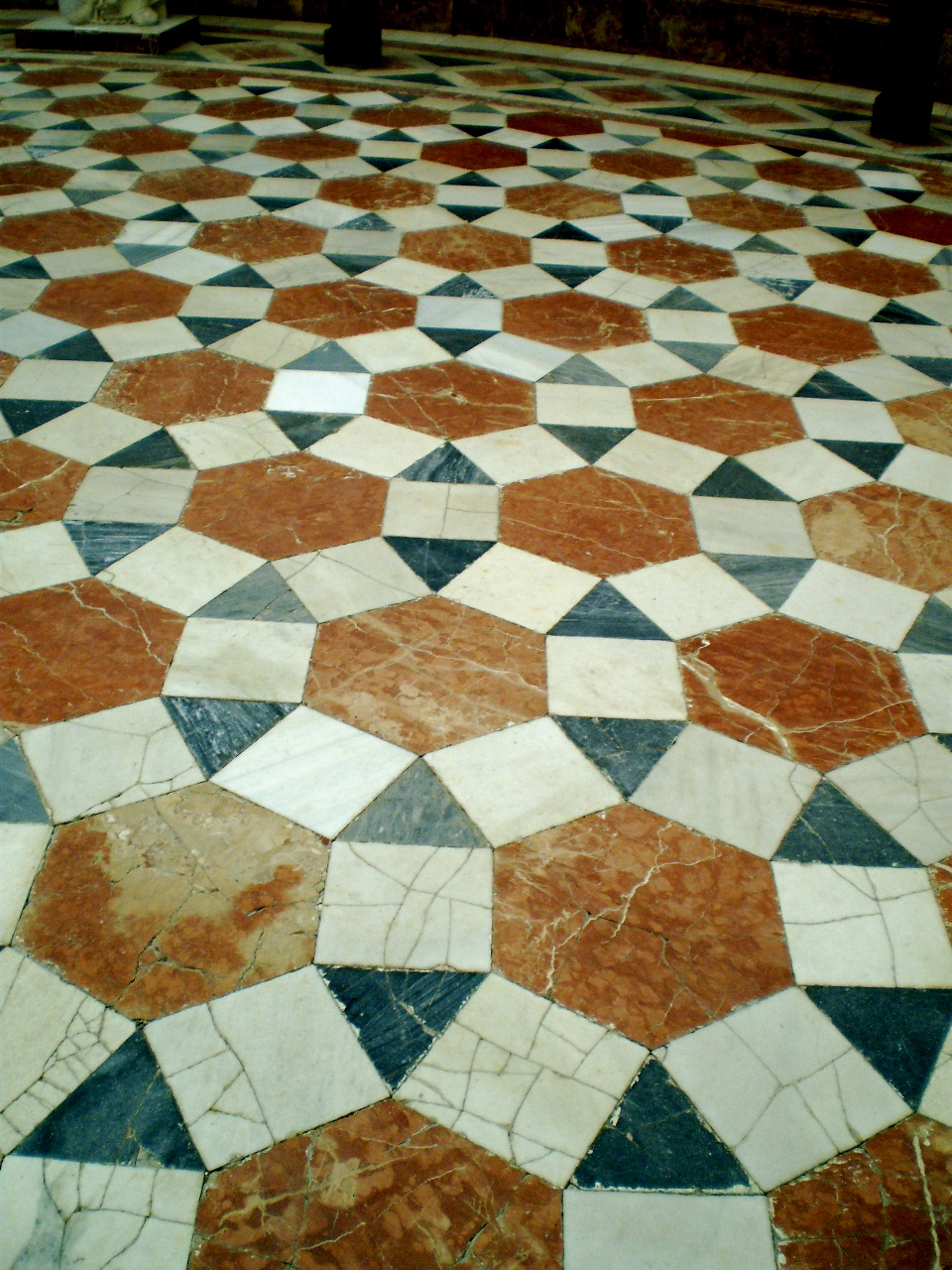
A rhombitrihexagonal tiling: tiled floor in the Archeological Museum of Seville, Spain, using square, triangle, and hexagon prototiles

Tessellation in two dimensions, also called planar tiling, is a topic in geometry that studies how shapes, known as tiles, can be arranged to fill a plane without any gaps, according to a given set of rules. These rules can be varied. Common ones are that there must be no gaps between tiles, and that no corner of one tile can lie along the edge of another. The tessellations created by bonded brickwork do not obey this rule. Among those that do, a regular tessellation has both identical (Note: The mathematical term for identical shapes is "congruent" – in mathematics, "identical" means they are the same tile.) regular tiles and identical regular corners or vertices, having the same angle between adjacent edges for every tile. There are only three shapes that can form such regular tessellations: the equilateral triangle, square and the regular hexagon. Any one of these three shapes can be duplicated infinitely to fill a plane with no gaps.

Many other types of tessellation are possible under different constraints. For example, there are eight types of semi-regular tessellation, made with more than one kind of regular polygon but still having the same arrangement of polygons at every corner. Irregular tessellations can also be made from other shapes such as pentagons, polyominoes and in fact almost any kind of geometric shape. The artist M. C. Escher is famous for making tessellations with irregular interlocking tiles, shaped like animals and other natural objects. If suitable contrasting colours are chosen for the tiles of differing shape, striking patterns are formed, and these can be used to decorate physical surfaces such as church floors.

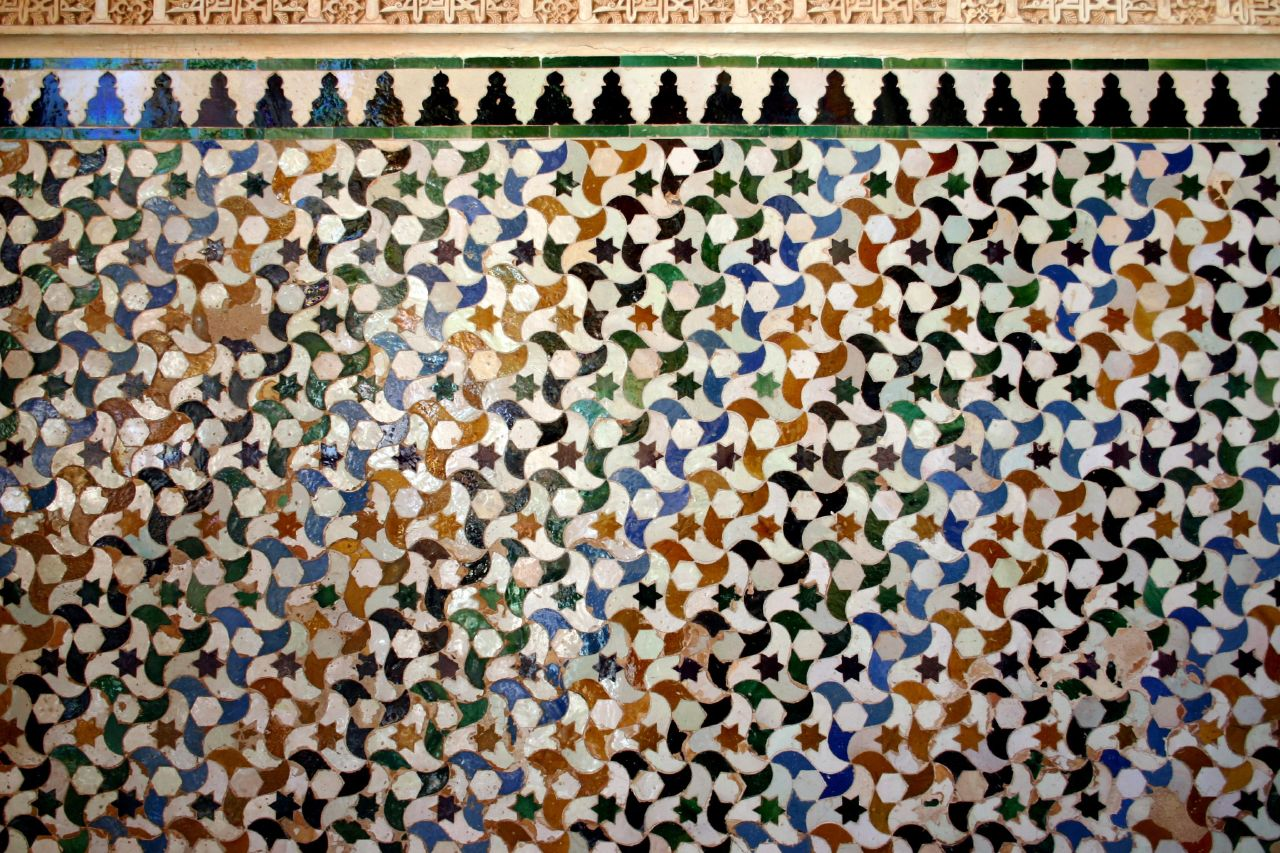
The elaborate and colourful zellige tessellations of glazed tiles at the Alhambra in Spain that attracted the attention of M. C. Escher

More formally, a tessellation or tiling is a cover of the Euclidean plane by a countable number of closed sets, called tiles, such that the tiles intersect only on their boundaries. These tiles may be polygons or any other shapes. (Note: The tiles are usually required to be homeomorphic (topologically equivalent) to a closed disk, which means bizarre shapes with holes, dangling line segments, or infinite areas are excluded.) Many tessellations are formed from a finite number of prototiles in which all tiles in the tessellation are congruent to the given prototiles. If a geometric shape can be used as a prototile to create a tessellation, the shape is said to tessellate or to tile the plane. The Conway criterion is a sufficient, but not necessary, set of rules for deciding whether a given shape tiles the plane periodically without reflections: some tiles fail the criterion, but still tile the plane. No general rule has been found for determining whether a given shape can tile the plane or not, which means there are many unsolved problems concerning tessellations.

Mathematically, tessellations can be extended to spaces other than the Euclidean plane. The Swiss geometer Ludwig Schläfli pioneered this by defining polyschemes, which mathematicians nowadays call polytopes. These are the analogues to polygons and polyhedra in spaces with more dimensions. He further defined the Schläfli symbol notation to make it easy to describe polytopes. For example, the Schläfli symbol for an equilateral triangle is {3}, while that for a square is {4}. The Schläfli notation makes it possible to describe tilings compactly. For example, a tiling of regular hexagons has three six-sided polygons at each vertex, so its Schläfli symbol is {6,3}.

Other methods also exist for describing polygonal tilings. When the tessellation is made of regular polygons, the most common notation is the vertex configuration, which is simply a list of the number of sides of the polygons around a vertex. The square tiling has a vertex configuration of 4.4.4.4, or 4^{4}. The tiling of regular hexagons is noted 6.6.6, or 6^{3}.

== In mathematics ==
=== Introduction to tessellations ===
Mathematicians use some technical terms when discussing tilings. An edge is the intersection between two bordering tiles; it is often a straight line. A vertex is the point of intersection of three or more bordering tiles. Using these terms, an isogonal or vertex-transitive tiling is a tiling where every vertex point is identical; that is, the arrangement of polygons about each vertex is the same. The fundamental region is a shape such as a rectangle that is repeated to form the tessellation. For example, a regular tessellation of the plane with squares has a meeting of four squares at every vertex.

The sides of the polygons are not necessarily identical to the edges of the tiles. An edge-to-edge tiling is any polygonal tessellation where adjacent tiles only share one full side, i.e., no tile shares a partial side or more than one side with any other tile. In an edge-to-edge tiling, the sides of the polygons and the edges of the tiles are the same. The familiar "brick wall" tiling is not edge-to-edge because the long side of each rectangular brick is shared with two bordering bricks.

A normal tiling is a tessellation for which every tile is topologically equivalent to a disk, the intersection of any two tiles is a connected set or the empty set, and all tiles are uniformly bounded. This means that a single circumscribing radius and a single inscribing radius can be used for all the tiles in the whole tiling; the condition disallows tiles that are pathologically long or thin.

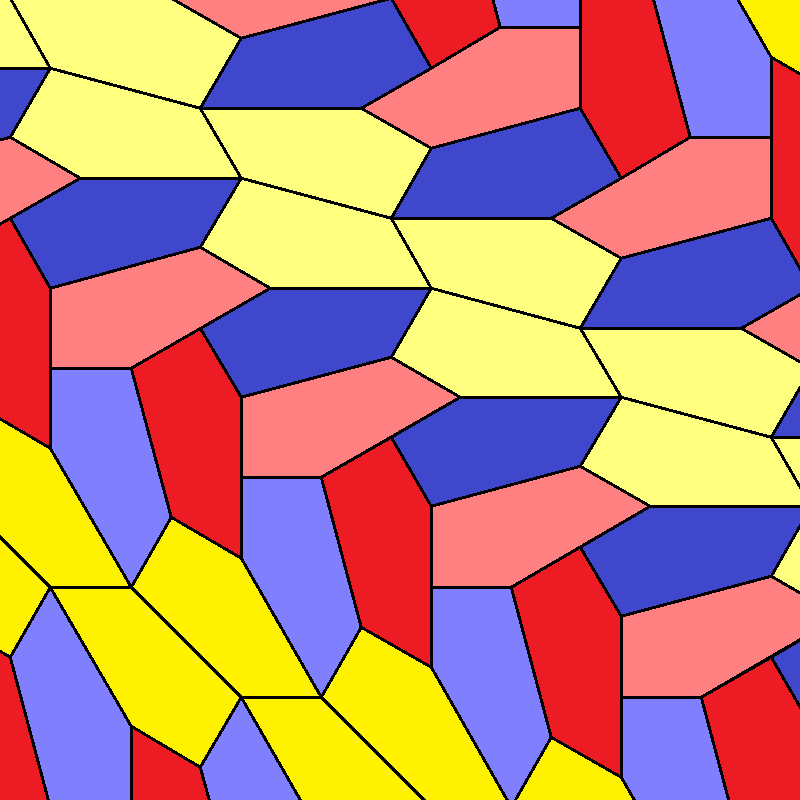
An example of a non-edge‑to‑edge tiling: the 15th convex monohedral pentagonal tiling, discovered in 2015

A monohedral tiling is a tessellation in which all tiles are congruent; it has only one prototile. A particularly interesting type of monohedral tessellation is the spiral monohedral tiling. The first spiral monohedral tiling was discovered by Heinz Voderberg in 1936; the Voderberg tiling has a unit tile that is a nonconvex enneagon. The Hirschhorn tiling, published by Michael D. Hirschhorn and D. C. Hunt in 1985, is a pentagon tiling using irregular pentagons: regular pentagons cannot tile the Euclidean plane as the internal angle of a regular pentagon, 3π/5, is not a divisor of 2π.

An isohedral tiling is a special variation of a monohedral tiling in which all tiles belong to the same transitivity class, that is, all tiles are transforms of the same prototile under the symmetry group of the tiling. If a prototile admits a tiling, but no such tiling is isohedral, then the prototile is called anisohedral and forms anisohedral tilings.

A regular tessellation is a highly symmetric, edge-to-edge tiling made up of regular polygons, all of the same shape. There are only three regular tessellations: those made up of equilateral triangles, squares, or regular hexagons. All three of these tilings are isogonal and monohedral.

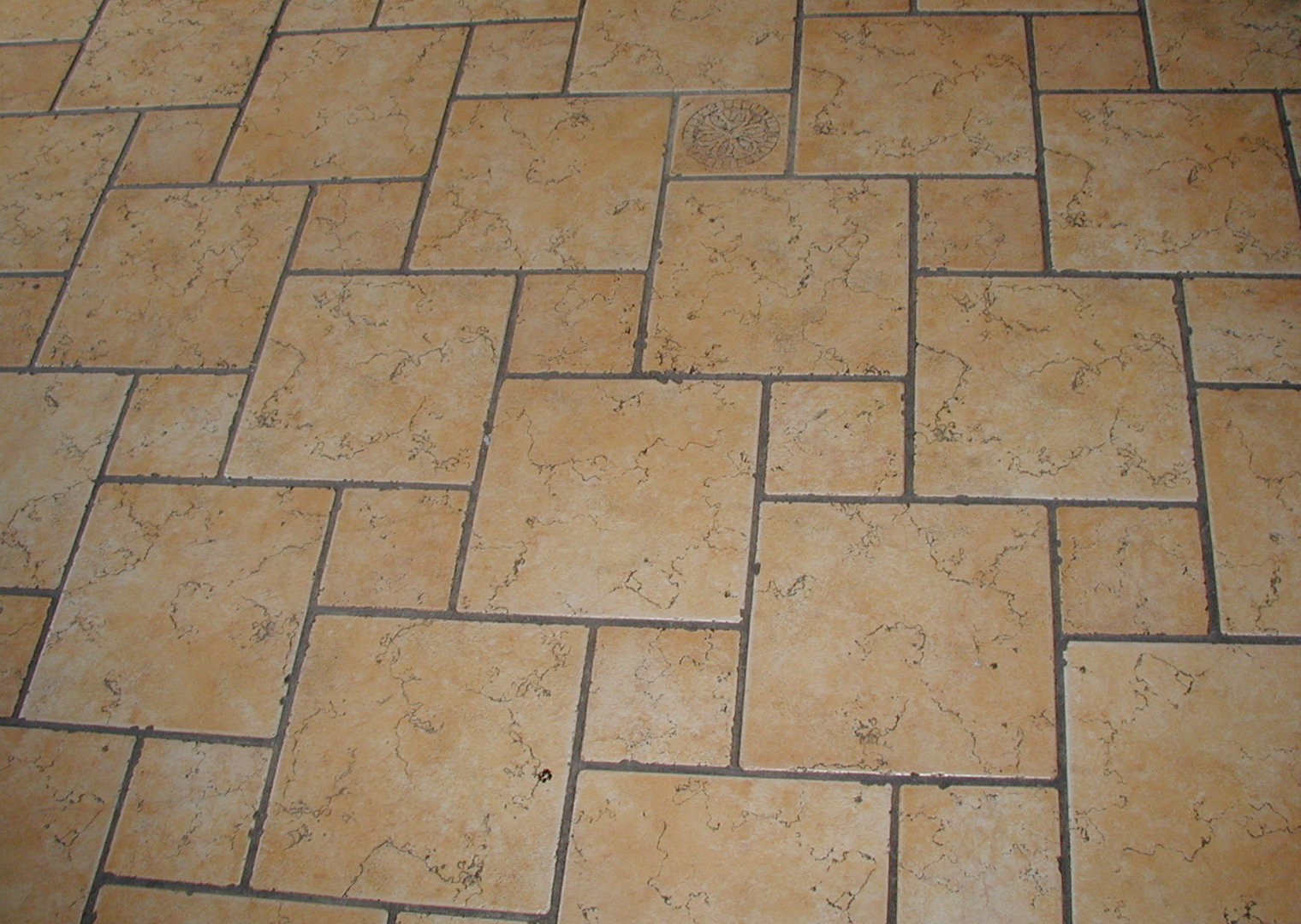
A Pythagorean tiling is not an edge‑to‑edge tiling.

A semi-regular (or Archimedean) tessellation uses more than one type of regular polygon in an isogonal arrangement. There are eight semi-regular tilings (or nine if the mirror-image pair of tilings counts as two). These can be described by their vertex configuration; for example, a semi-regular tiling using squares and regular octagons has the vertex configuration 4.8^{2} (each vertex has one square and two octagons). Many non-edge-to-edge tilings of the Euclidean plane are possible, including the family of Pythagorean tilings, tessellations that use two (parameterised) sizes of square, each square touching four squares of the other size. An edge tessellation is one in which each tile can be reflected over an edge to take up the position of a neighbouring tile, such as in an array of equilateral or isosceles triangles.

=== Wallpaper groups ===
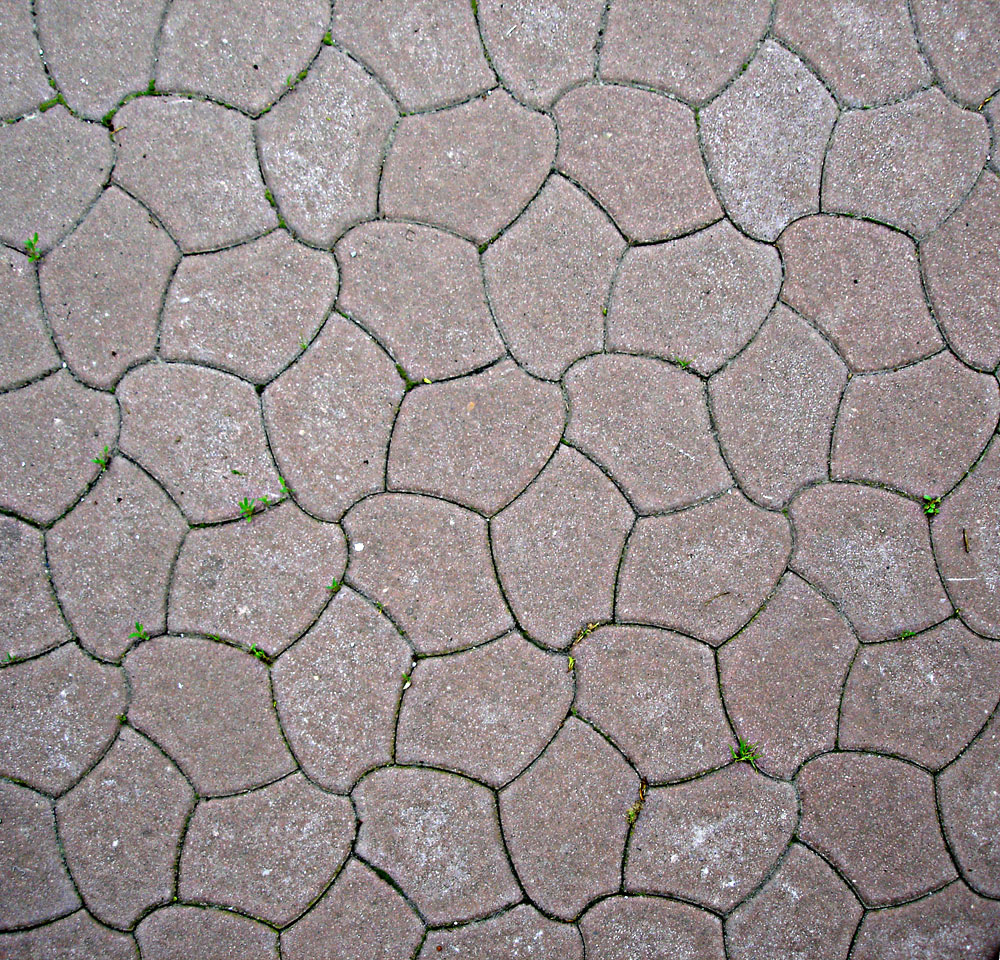
This tessellated, monohedral street pavement uses curved shapes instead of polygons. It belongs to wallpaper group p3.

Tilings with translational symmetry in two independent directions can be categorized by wallpaper groups, of which 17 exist. It has been claimed that all seventeen of these groups are represented in the Alhambra palace in Granada, Spain. Although this is disputed, the variety and sophistication of the Alhambra tilings have interested modern researchers. Of the three regular tilings two are in the p6m wallpaper group and one is in p4m. Tilings in 2-D with translational symmetry in just one direction may be categorized by the seven frieze groups describing the possible frieze patterns. Orbifold notation can be used to describe wallpaper groups of the Euclidean plane.

=== Aperiodic tilings ===
A Penrose tiling, with several symmetries, but no periodic repetitions

Penrose tilings, which use two different quadrilateral prototiles, are the best known example of tiles that forcibly create non-periodic patterns. They belong to a general class of aperiodic tilings, which use tiles that cannot tessellate periodically. The recursive process of substitution tiling is a method of generating aperiodic tilings. One class that can be generated in this way is the rep-tiles; these tilings have unexpected self-replicating properties. Pinwheel tilings are non-periodic, using a rep-tile construction; the tiles appear in infinitely many orientations. It might be thought that a non-periodic pattern would be entirely without symmetry, but this is not so. Aperiodic tilings, while lacking in translational symmetry, do have symmetries of other types, by infinite repetition of any bounded patch of the tiling and in certain finite groups of rotations or reflections of those patches. A substitution rule, such as can be used to generate Penrose patterns using assemblies of tiles called rhombs, illustrates scaling symmetry. A Fibonacci word can be used to build an aperiodic tiling, and to study quasicrystals, which are structures with aperiodic order.

A set of 13 Wang tiles that tile the plane only aperiodically

Wang tiles are squares coloured on each edge, and placed so that abutting edges of adjacent tiles have the same colour; hence they are sometimes called Wang dominoes. A suitable set of Wang dominoes can tile the plane, but only aperiodically. This is known because any Turing machine can be represented as a set of Wang dominoes that tile the plane if, and only if, the Turing machine does not halt. Since the halting problem is undecidable, the problem of deciding whether a Wang domino set can tile the plane is also undecidable.

Random Truchet tiling

Truchet tiles are square tiles decorated with patterns so they do not have rotational symmetry; in 1704, Sébastien Truchet used a square tile split into two triangles of contrasting colours. These can tile the plane either periodically or randomly.

An einstein tile is a single shape that forces aperiodic tiling. The first such tile, dubbed a "hat", was discovered in 2022 by David Smith, a hobbyist mathematician, and in 2023 he and collaborators Joseph Samuel Myers, Craig S. Kaplan, and Chaim Goodman-Strauss proved that it tiles the plane only non-periodically, solving the longstanding einstein problem. The same team subsequently discovered a related shape, dubbed the "spectre", which tiles the plane aperiodically using only rotations and translations, without requiring reflected copies.

=== Tessellations and colour ===
At least seven colours are required if the colours of this tiling are to form a pattern by repeating this rectangle as the fundamental domain; more generally, at least four colours are needed.

Sometimes the colour of a tile is understood as part of the tiling; at other times arbitrary colours may be applied later. When discussing a tiling that is displayed in colours, to avoid ambiguity, one needs to specify whether the colours are part of the tiling or just part of its illustration. This affects whether tiles with the same shape, but different colours, are considered identical, which in turn affects questions of symmetry. The four colour theorem states that for every tessellation of a normal Euclidean plane, with a set of four available colours, each tile can be coloured in one colour such that no tiles of equal colour meet at a curve of positive length. The colouring guaranteed by the four colour theorem does not generally respect the symmetries of the tessellation. To produce a colouring that does, it is necessary to treat the colours as part of the tessellation. Here, as many as seven colours may be needed, as demonstrated in the image at left.

=== Tessellations with polygons ===
Next to the various tilings by regular polygons, tilings by other polygons have also been studied.

Any triangle or quadrilateral (even non-convex) can be used as a prototile to form a monohedral tessellation, often in more than one way. Copies of an arbitrary quadrilateral can form a tessellation with translational symmetry and 2-fold rotational symmetry with centres at the midpoints of all sides. For an asymmetric quadrilateral this tiling belongs to wallpaper group p2. As fundamental domain we have the quadrilateral. Equivalently, we can construct a parallelogram subtended by a minimal set of translation vectors, starting from a rotational centre. We can divide this by one diagonal, and take one half (a triangle) as fundamental domain. Such a triangle has the same area as the quadrilateral and can be constructed from it by cutting and pasting.

Tessellation using Texas-shaped non-convex 12-sided polygons

If only one shape of tile is allowed, tilings exist with convex N-gons for N equal to 3, 4, 5, and 6. For N = 5, see Pentagonal tiling, for N = 6, see Hexagonal tiling, for N = 7, see Heptagonal tiling and for N = 8, see octagonal tiling.

With non-convex polygons, there are far fewer limitations in the number of sides, even if only one shape is allowed.

Polyominoes are examples of tiles that are either convex of non-convex, for which various combinations, rotations, and reflections can be used to tile a plane. For results on tiling the plane with polyominoes, see Polyomino § Uses of polyominoes.

=== Voronoi tilings ===
A Voronoi tiling, in which the cells are always convex polygons

Voronoi or Dirichlet tilings are tessellations where each tile is defined as the set of points closest to one of the points in a discrete set of defining points. (Think of geographical regions where each region is defined as all the points closest to a given city or post office.) The Voronoi cell for each defining point is a convex polygon. The Delaunay triangulation is a tessellation that is the dual graph of a Voronoi tessellation. Delaunay triangulations are useful in numerical simulation, in part because among all possible triangulations of the defining points, Delaunay triangulations maximize the minimum of the angles formed by the edges. Voronoi tilings with randomly placed points can be used to construct random tilings of the plane.

=== Tessellations in higher dimensions ===
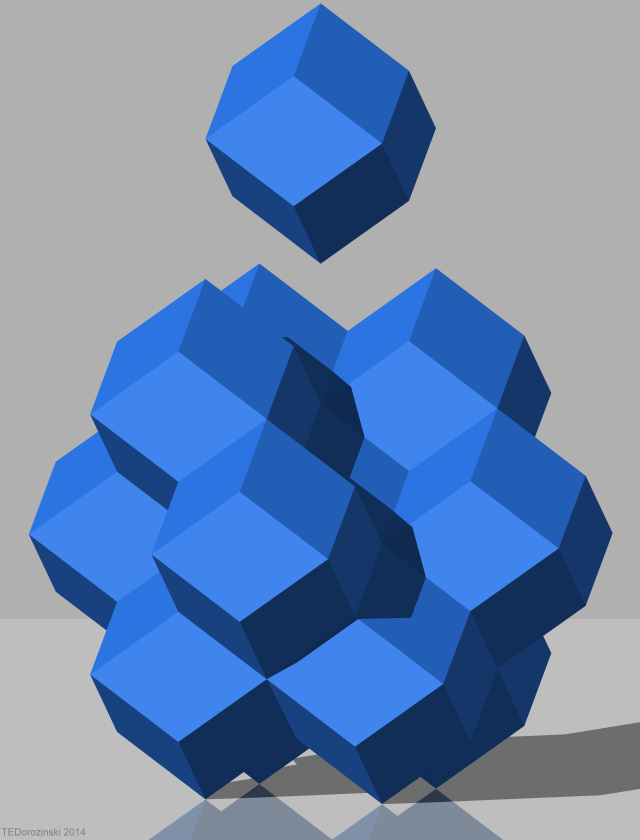
Tessellating three-dimensional (3-D) space: the rhombic dodecahedron is one of the solids that can be stacked to fill space exactly.

Tessellation can be extended to three dimensions. Certain polyhedra can be stacked in a regular crystal pattern to fill (or tile) three-dimensional space, including the cube (the only Platonic polyhedron to do so), the rhombic dodecahedron, the truncated octahedron, and triangular, quadrilateral, and hexagonal prisms, among others. Any polyhedron that fits this criterion is known as a plesiohedron, and may possess between 4 and 38 faces. Naturally occurring rhombic dodecahedra are found as crystals of andradite (a kind of garnet) and fluorite.

Illustration of a Schmitt–Conway biprism, also called a Schmitt–Conway–Danzer tile

Tessellations in three or more dimensions are called honeycombs. In three dimensions there is just one regular honeycomb, which has eight cubes at each polyhedron vertex. Similarly, in three dimensions there is just one quasiregular (Note: In this context, quasiregular means that the cells are regular (solids), and the vertex figures are semiregular.) honeycomb, which has eight tetrahedra and six octahedra at each polyhedron vertex. However, there are many possible semiregular honeycombs in three dimensions. Uniform honeycombs can be constructed using the Wythoff construction.

The Schmitt-Conway biprism is a convex polyhedron with the property of tiling space only aperiodically.

A Schwarz triangle is a spherical triangle that can be used to tile a sphere.

=== Tessellations in non-Euclidean geometries ===
Rhombitriheptagonal tiling in hyperbolic plane, seen in Poincaré disk model projection

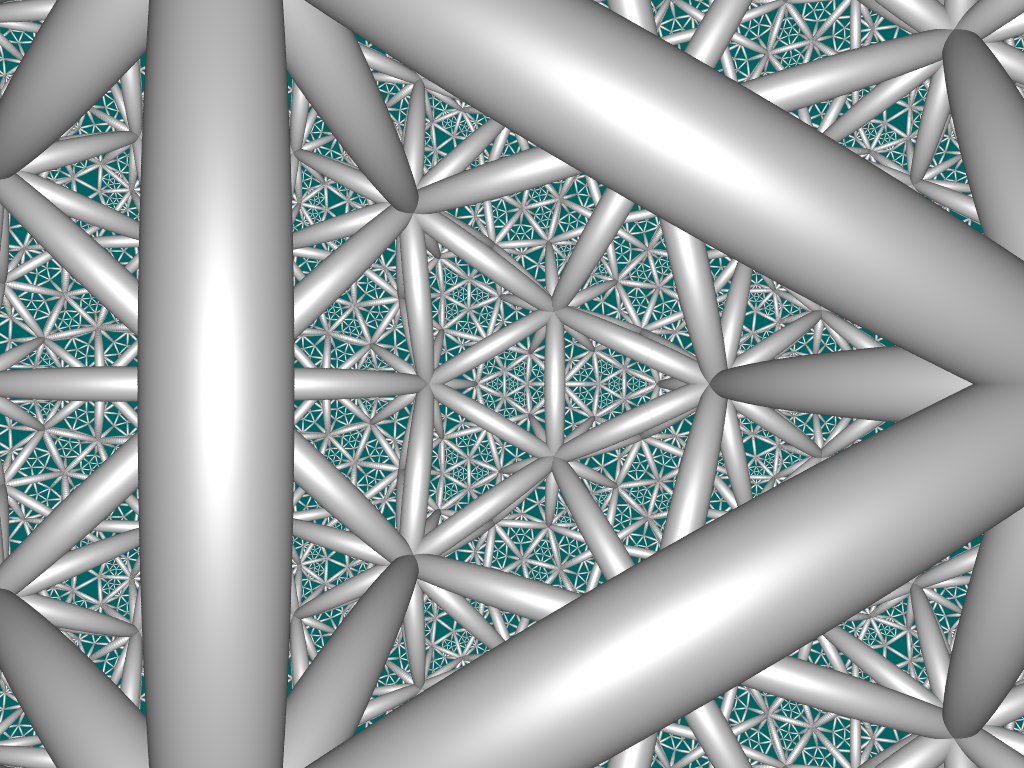
The regular {3,5,3} icosahedral honeycomb, one of four regular compact honeycombs in hyperbolic 3-space

It is possible to tessellate in non-Euclidean geometries such as hyperbolic geometry. A uniform tiling in the hyperbolic plane (that may be regular, quasiregular, or semiregular) is an edge-to-edge filling of the hyperbolic plane, with regular polygons as faces; these are vertex-transitive (transitive on its vertices), and isogonal (there is an isometry mapping any vertex onto any other).

A uniform honeycomb in hyperbolic space is a uniform tessellation of uniform polyhedral cells. In three-dimensional (3-D) hyperbolic space there are nine Coxeter group families of compact convex uniform honeycombs, generated as Wythoff constructions, and represented by permutations of rings of the Coxeter diagrams for each family.

== In art ==
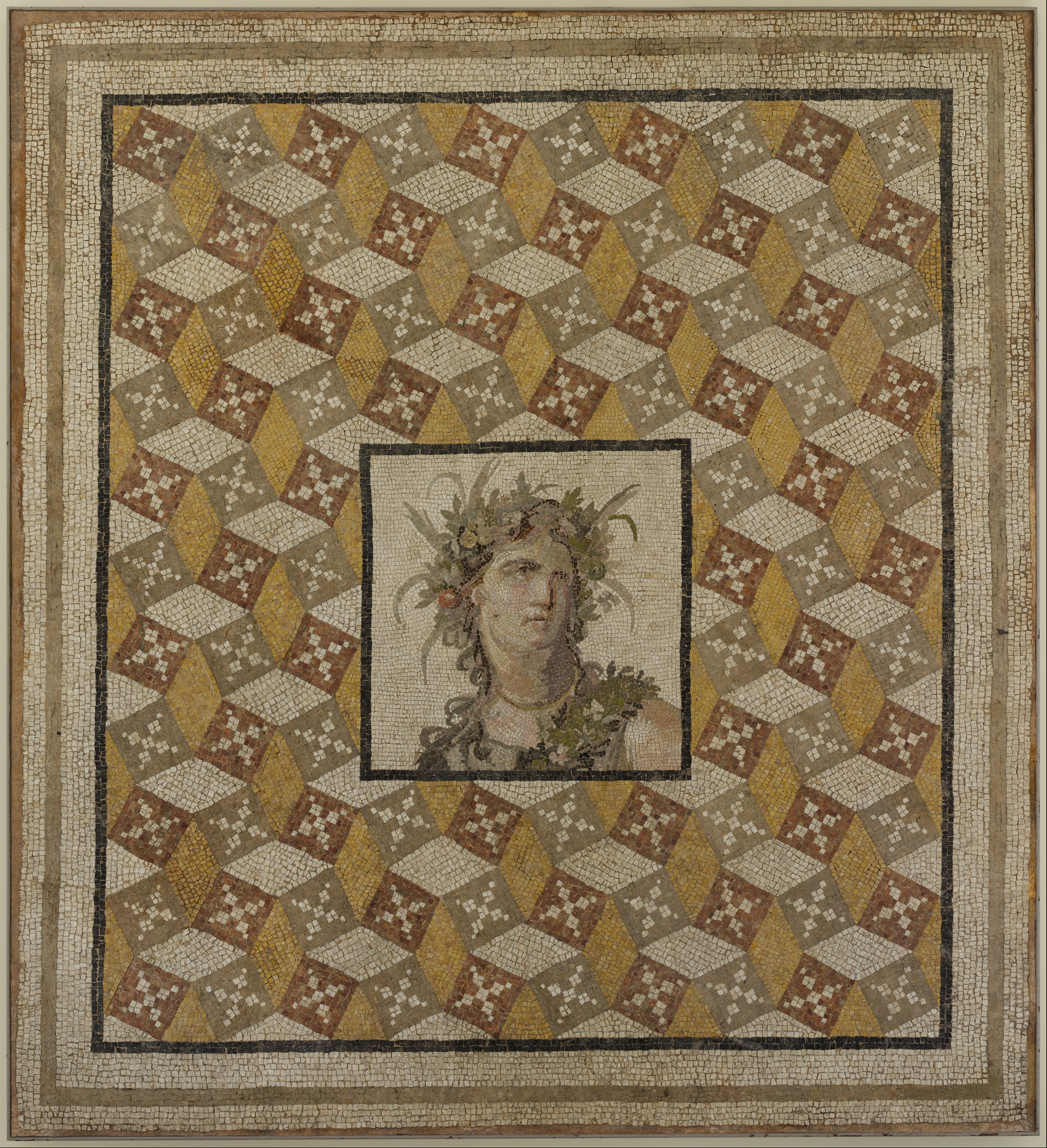
Roman mosaic floor panel of stone, tile, and glass, from a villa near Antioch in Roman Syria. Second century AD.

In architecture, tessellations have been used to create decorative motifs since ancient times. Mosaic tilings often had geometric patterns. Later civilisations also used larger tiles, either plain or individually decorated. Some of the most decorative were the Moorish wall tilings of Islamic architecture, using Girih and Zellige tiles in buildings such as the Alhambra and La Mezquita.

Tessellations frequently appeared in the graphic art of M. C. Escher; he was inspired by the Moorish use of symmetry in places such as the Alhambra when he visited Spain in 1936. Escher made four "Circle Limit" drawings of tilings that use hyperbolic geometry. For his woodcut "Circle Limit IV" (1960), Escher prepared a pencil and ink study showing the required geometry. Escher explained that "No single component of all the series, which from infinitely far away rise like rockets perpendicularly from the limit and are at last lost in it, ever reaches the boundary line."

A quilt showing a regular tessellation pattern

Tessellated designs often appear on textiles, whether woven, stitched in, or printed. Tessellation patterns have been used to design interlocking motifs of patch shapes in quilts.

Tessellations are also a main genre in origami, where pleats are used to connect molecules, such as twist folds, together in a repeating fashion.

== In manufacturing ==
Tessellation is used in manufacturing industry to reduce the wastage of material (yield losses) such as sheet metal when cutting out shapes for objects such as car doors or drink cans.

Tessellation is apparent in the mudcrack-like cracking of thin films – with a degree of self-organisation being observed using micro and nanotechnologies.

== In nature ==
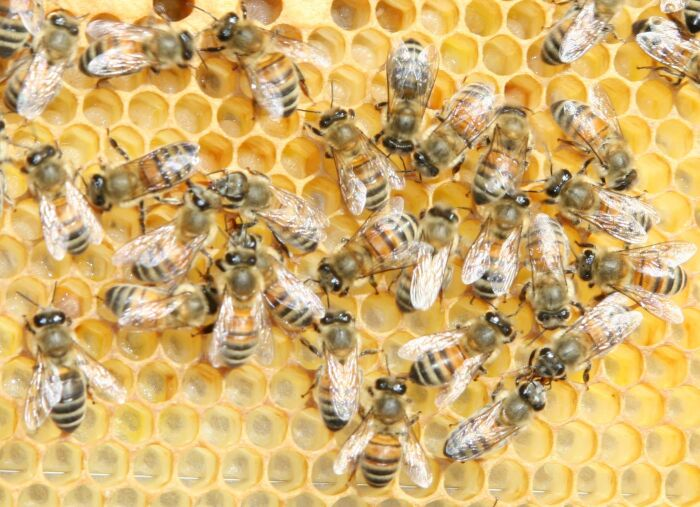
A honeycomb is a natural tessellated structure.

The honeycomb is a well-known example of tessellation in nature with its hexagonal cells.

In botany, the term "tessellate" describes a checkered pattern, for example on a flower petal, tree bark, or fruit. Flowers including the fritillary, and some species of Colchicum, are characteristically tessellate.

Many patterns in nature are formed by cracks in sheets of materials. These patterns can be described by Gilbert tessellations, also known as random crack networks. The Gilbert tessellation is a mathematical model for the formation of mudcracks, needle-like crystals, and similar structures. The model, named after Edgar Gilbert, allows cracks to form starting from being randomly scattered over the plane; each crack propagates in two opposite directions along a line through the initiation point, its slope chosen at random, creating a tessellation of irregular convex polygons. Basaltic lava flows often display columnar jointing as a result of contraction forces causing cracks as the lava cools. The extensive crack networks that develop often produce hexagonal columns of lava. One example of such an array of columns is the Giant's Causeway in Northern Ireland. Tessellated pavement, a characteristic example of which is found at Eaglehawk Neck on the Tasman Peninsula of Tasmania, is a rare sedimentary rock formation where the rock has fractured into rectangular blocks.

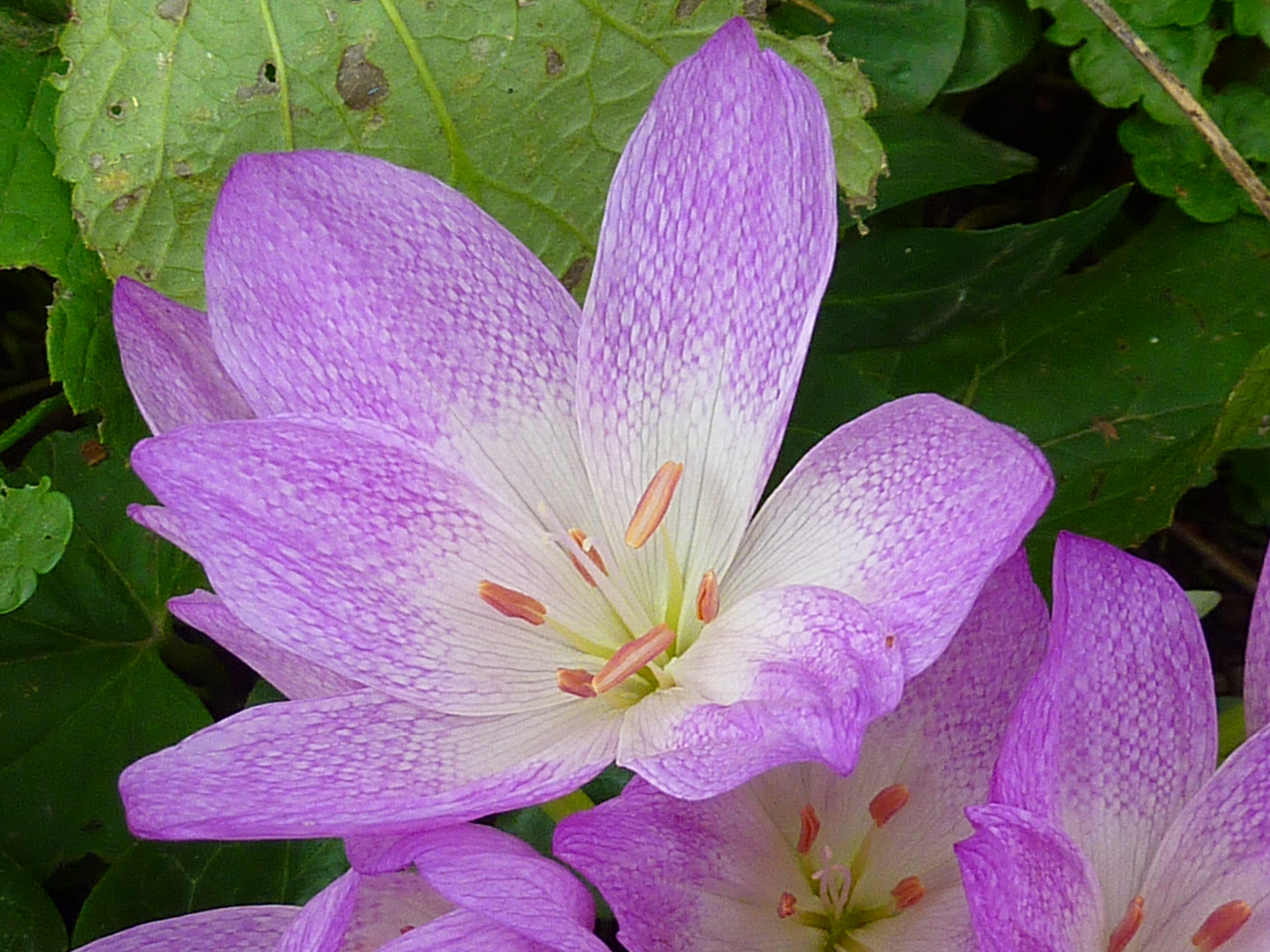
Tessellate pattern in a Colchicum flower

Other natural patterns occur in foams; these are packed according to Plateau's laws, which require minimal surfaces. Such foams present a problem in how to pack cells as tightly as possible: in 1887, Lord Kelvin proposed a packing using only one solid, the bitruncated cubic honeycomb with very slightly curved faces. In 1993, Denis Weaire and Robert Phelan proposed the Weaire–Phelan structure, which uses less surface area to separate cells of equal volume than Kelvin's foam.

== In puzzles and recreational mathematics ==
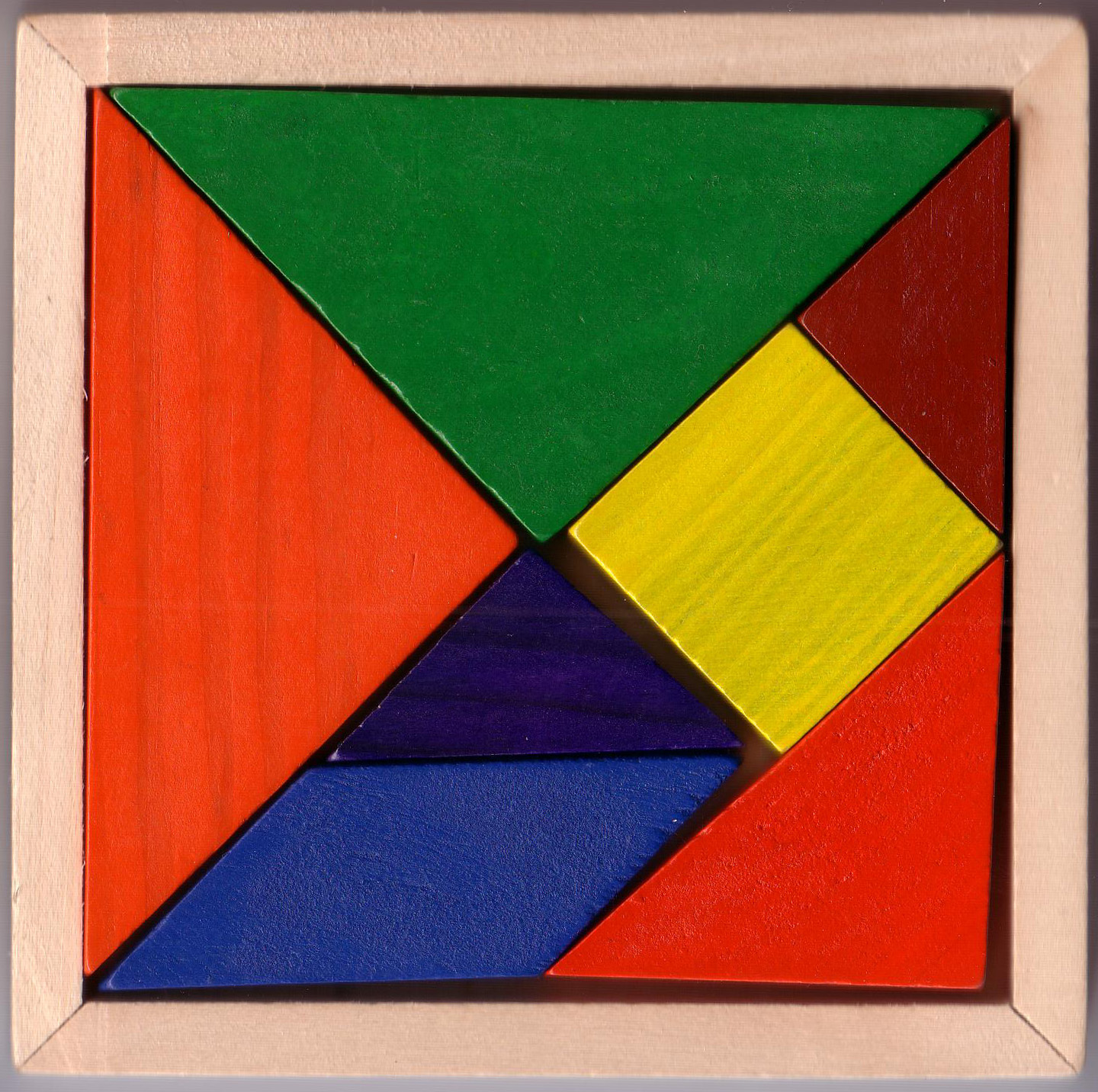
Traditional tangram dissection puzzle

Tessellations have given rise to many types of tiling puzzle, from traditional jigsaw puzzles (with irregular pieces of wood or cardboard) and the tangram, to more modern puzzles that often have a mathematical basis. For example, polyiamonds and polyominoes are figures of regular triangles and squares, often used in tiling puzzles. Authors such as Henry Dudeney and Martin Gardner have made many uses of tessellation in recreational mathematics. For example, Dudeney invented the hinged dissection, while Gardner wrote about the "rep-tile", a shape that can be dissected into smaller copies of the same shape. Inspired by Gardner's articles in Scientific American, the amateur mathematician Marjorie Rice found four new tessellations with pentagons. Squaring the square is the problem of tiling an integral square (one whose sides have integer length) using only other integral squares. An extension is squaring the plane, tiling it by squares whose sizes are all natural numbers without repetitions; James and Frederick Henle proved that this was possible.

== Examples ==
Triangular tiling, one of the three regular tilings of the plane

Snub hexagonal tiling, a semiregular tiling of the plane

Floret pentagonal tiling, dual to a semiregular tiling and one of 15 monohedral pentagon tilings

All tiling elements are identical pseudo‑triangles by disregarding their colors and ornaments

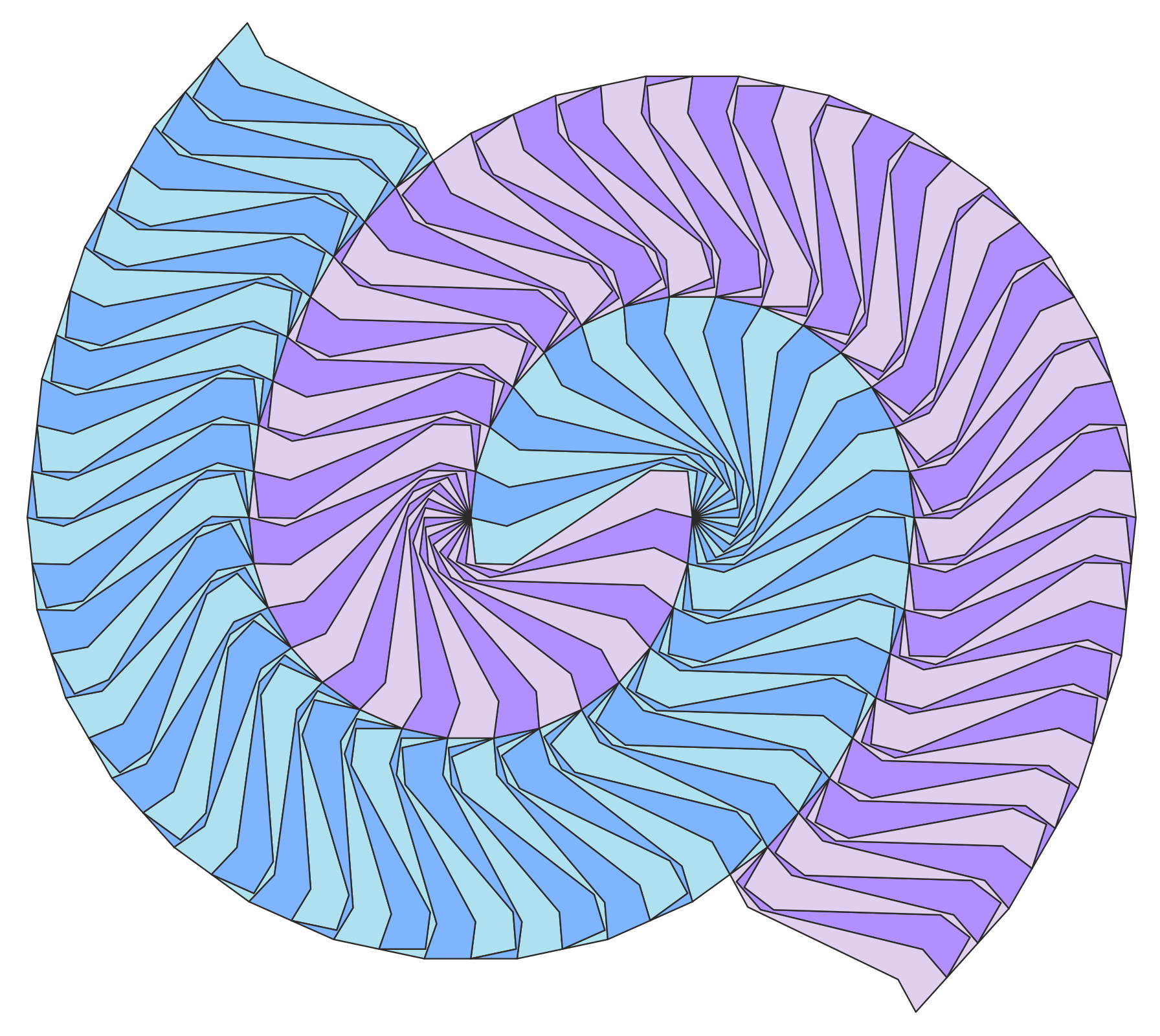
The Voderberg tiling, a spiral, monohedral tiling made of enneagons

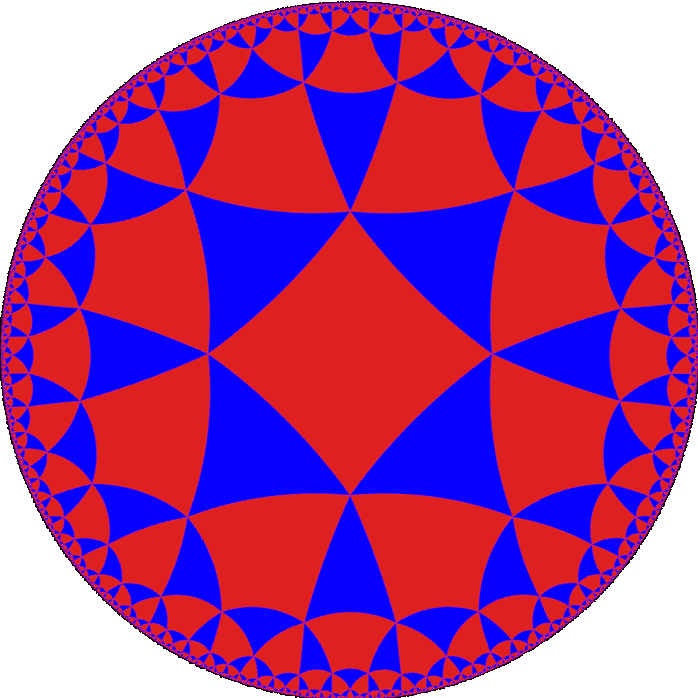
Alternated octagonal or tritetragonal tiling is a uniform tiling of the hyperbolic plane

Topological square tiling, isohedrally distorted into I shapes

== See also ==
- Discrete global grid
- Honeycomb (geometry)
- List of mathematical art software
- Packing problem
- Perfect rectangle
- Space partitioning

== Sources ==
- Coxeter, H. S. M. (1973). "Section IV : Tessellations and Honeycombs". Regular Polytopes. Dover Publications. ISBN 978-0-486-61480-9.
- Escher, M. C. (1974). J. L. Locher (ed.). The World of M. C. Escher (New Concise NAL ed.). Abrams. ISBN 978-0-451-79961-6.
- Gardner, Martin (1989). Penrose Tiles to Trapdoor Ciphers. Cambridge University Press. ISBN 978-0-88385-521-8.
- Grünbaum, Branko; Shephard, G. C. (1987). Tilings and Patterns. W. H. Freeman. ISBN 978-0-7167-1193-3.
- Gullberg, Jan (1997). Mathematics From the Birth of Numbers. Norton. ISBN 978-0-393-04002-9.
- Stewart, Ian (2001). What Shape Is a Snowflake?. Weidenfeld and Nicolson. ISBN 978-0-297-60723-6.
