= Topkapı Scroll =

Timurid dynasty scroll

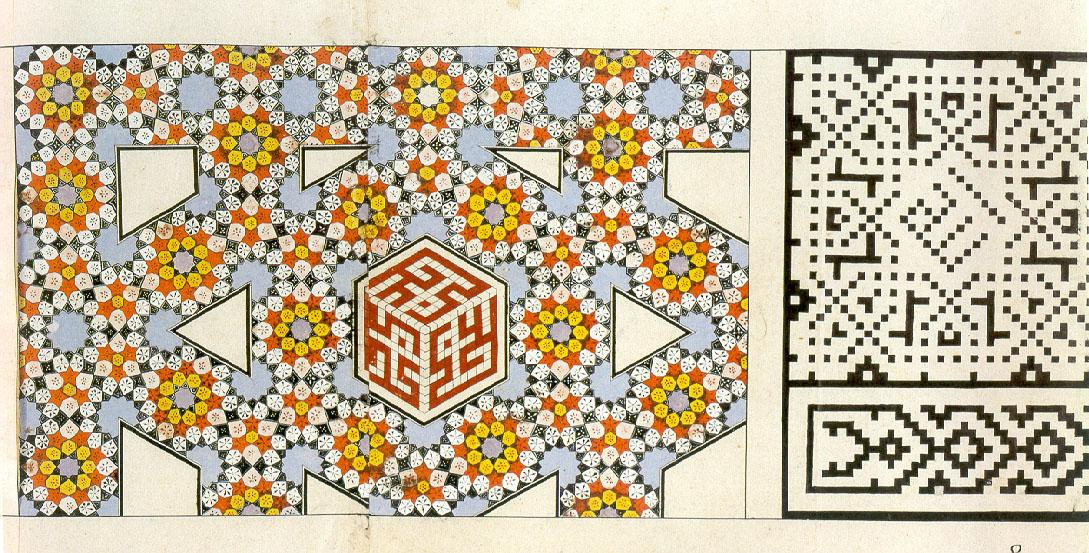
Two adjacent patterns in the Topkapı Scroll. The cube-like red hexagon in the left pattern is covered in Square Kufic script.

The Topkapı Scroll (Turkish: Topkapı Parşömeni) is a Timurid dynasty patterned scroll in the collection of the Topkapı Palace museum.

The scroll is a valuable source of information, consisting of 114 patterns that may have been used both indirectly and directly by architects to create the tiling patterns in many mosques around the world, including the quasicrystal Girih tiles from Darb-e Imam.

== Physical properties ==
The Topkapı scroll is a 33 cm (13 in) wide scroll of 29.5 m (97 ft) in length, which is unrolled side to side. One end of the scroll is fixed to a wooden roller, and the other end is glued to a protective leather piece.

A number of parchment pieces featuring various patterns are applied on the scroll. The differences in the border of some drawings indicate that the Topkapı Scroll consists of two different scrolls fixed together. The fact that it is not worn out suggests that it was not made to be used as a reference document in a craftsman's workshop, but rather than as an exhibition work in the palace. It was probably a record of tiling works carried out in the palace.

The scroll was made by one person only. Most of the patterns were drawn on two pieces of parchment that were put together, and then pasted on the scroll. The placement of the patterns on the scroll is somewhat disorganized. Patterns of similar themes are fallen apart, and some patterns formed on two parchment pieces are combined imperfectly.

The stamp on the scroll "H1956" indicates that it is registered in the inventory of the Topkapı Palace's Treasury department.

An edition of the scroll was published with an extensive commentary, but it is now out of print.

== History ==
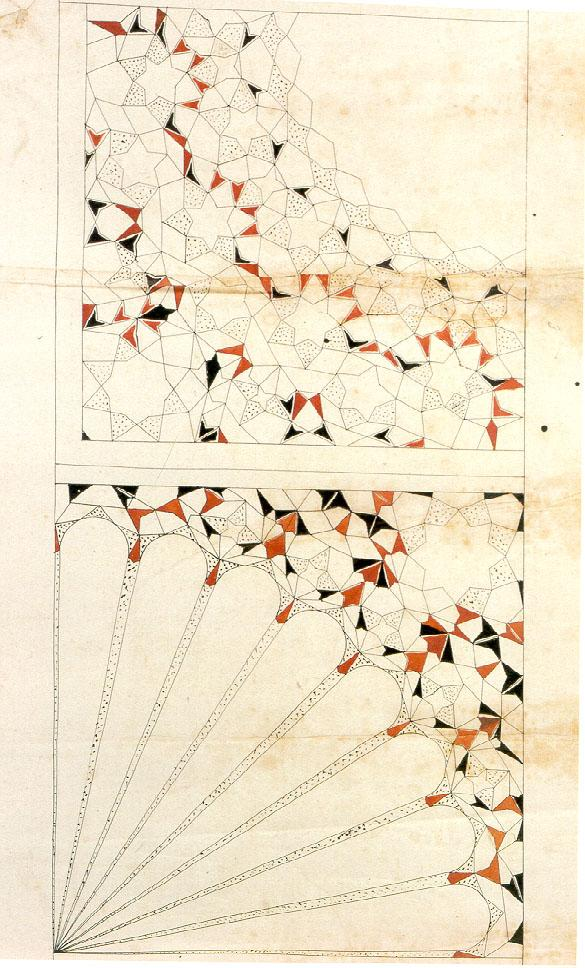
Quarter dome muqarnas - in the form of a seashell (top), in the form of a radial, hand-held fan (bottom)

The Topkapı Scroll was presumably prepared in Iran during the Safavid dynasty in the end of the 15th century or beginning of the 16th century. A similarity between some of the patterns on the Topkapı Scroll and a tile panel in the Jame-e Kabir Mosque (grand mosque) in Yazd indicates that this scroll was created in Tabriz. Alternatively, the scroll may have originated in Shiraz as it primarily features muqarnas in the form of a hand-held fan referred by Jamshīd al-Kāshī as Shirazi. It may have been looted by the Ottomans after the Ottoman–Safavid War (1578–90).

The muqarnas on the scroll, which are mostly in the form of a hand-held fan, reflect the architectural style of the Timurid dynasty, Turkmen people in Iran and Central Asia. In contrast, the muqarnas in Cairo are in the form of seashell.

The Topkapı Scroll was discovered in 1986. Gülru Necipoğlu of Harvard University published a book, which describes the scroll with copies of its patterns. The book was translated into Persian language by Mihrdad Kayyumi Bidhind under the title Handasa va Tazyin dar Mi‘mari-yi Islami: Tomar-i Topkapı (Tahran, Kitabkhana-yi Milli-yi Iran, 1379).

== Content ==
The scroll consists of 114 geometric patterns drawn in ink and dye. It displays decorative ornaments found on the walls and domes of structures built between the 10th and 16th century in the Timurid dynasty. It was a guidebook for architectural designs seen in complex muqarnas, girih, mosaic panels and colorful tiles. The scroll does not mention how those patterns are constructed, and has no date or signature.

Since the scroll's designs are two-dimensional, it remains uncertain how these patterns were intended to be translated into three-dimensional architectural ornaments.

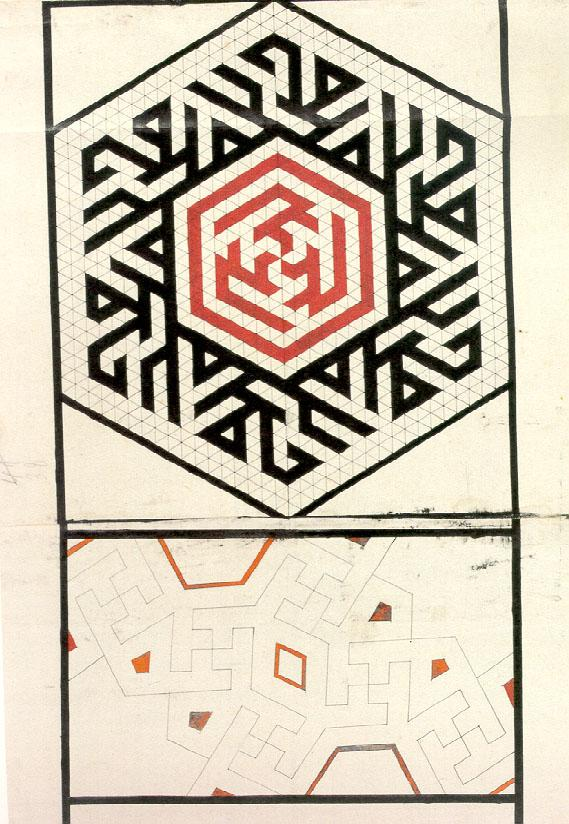
Hexagon with Kufic scripts of six time Muhammad (Muḥammad ibn ʿAbd Allāh) and three time Ali (Alī ibn Abī Ṭālib) in rotational symmetry

One of the characteristics of the Topkapı Scroll is that it includes Arabic calligraphy called square or geometric Kufic. This script type was seen for the first time in the state of Ilkhanate, and it was presumably created in inspiration from Chinese characters in rectangular form. One of the patterns on the Topkapı Scroll, which matches an existing architectural structure, is the Kufic script drawn for banna'i, in which tiles are alternated with plain bricks to create geometric patterns over the surface of a wall. Almost exactly the same of this pattern is found on the gate of a mosque in Varzaneh.

Some of the patterns show the application of geometric principles to Islamic traditions. For example, the word Muhammad (Muḥammad ibn ʿAbd Allāh) is repeated six times along the sides of the hexagon, and the word Ali (Alī ibn Abī Ṭālib) three times in a rotating wise in the inner hexagon.

One pattern on the scroll consists of nine-pointed and eleven-pointed geometric star figures, and other one thirteen-pointed and sixteen-pointed geometric star figures. In the Islamic art, this sort of stars were developed by folding certain patterns along the sides of a square.

Some of the drawings on the scroll are formed by overlapped patterns of different scales. This feature is seen frequently in Islamic architecture. Detailed patterns within an ornament appear when one gets closer to a building with figures, which are difficult to perceive from a distance.
