= Girih =

Geometric patterns in Islamic architecture

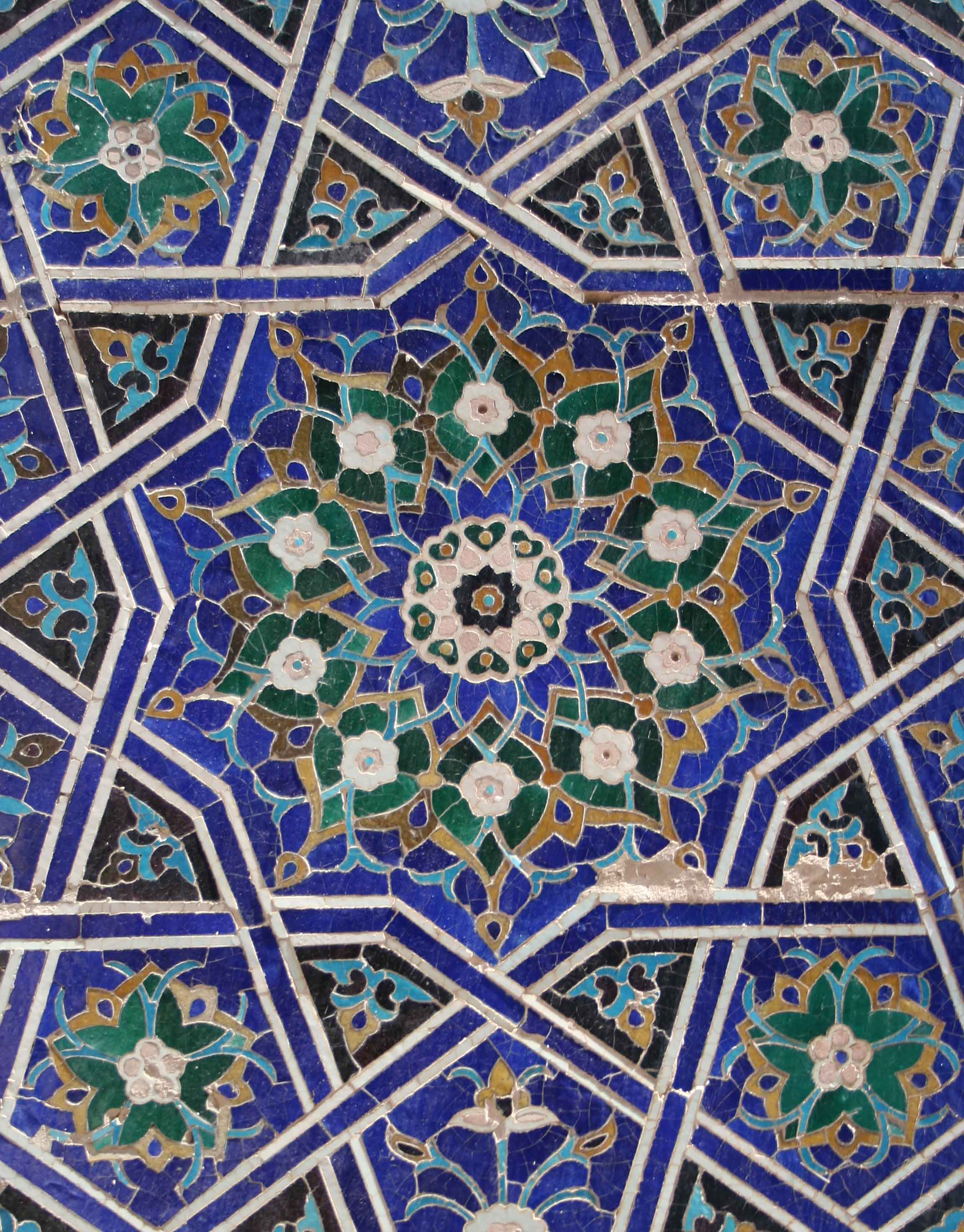
Girih pattern with inlaid floral decoration from Shah-i-Zinda in Samarkand, Uzbekistan

Girih (Persian: گره, "knot", also written gereh) are decorative Islamic geometric patterns used in architecture and handicraft objects, consisting of angled lines that form an interlaced strapwork pattern.

Girih decoration is believed to have been inspired by Syrian Roman knotwork patterns from the second century. However, its mathematical patterns, structured around multiple lines of symmetry, are based on innovations in mathematics that occurred in the Islamic world after the ninth century. The earliest girih dates from around 1000 CE, and the artform flourished until the 15th century. Girih patterns can be created in a variety of ways, including the traditional straightedge and compass construction; the construction of a grid of polygons; and the use of a set of girih tiles with lines drawn on them: the lines form the pattern. Patterns may be elaborated by the use of two levels of design, as at the 1453 Darb-e Imam shrine. Square repeating units of known patterns can be copied as templates, and historic pattern books may have been intended for use in this way.

The 15th century Topkapı Scroll explicitly shows girih patterns together with the tilings used to create them. A set of tiles consisting of a dart and a kite shape can be used to create aperiodic Penrose tilings, though there is no evidence that such a set was used in medieval times. Girih patterns have been used to decorate varied materials including stone screens, as at Fatehpur Sikri; plasterwork, as at mosques and madrasas such as the Hunat Hatun Complex in Kayseri; metal, as at Mosque-Madrassa of Sultan Hassan in Cairo; and in wood, as at the Mosque–Cathedral of Córdoba.

== History ==
=== Origins ===
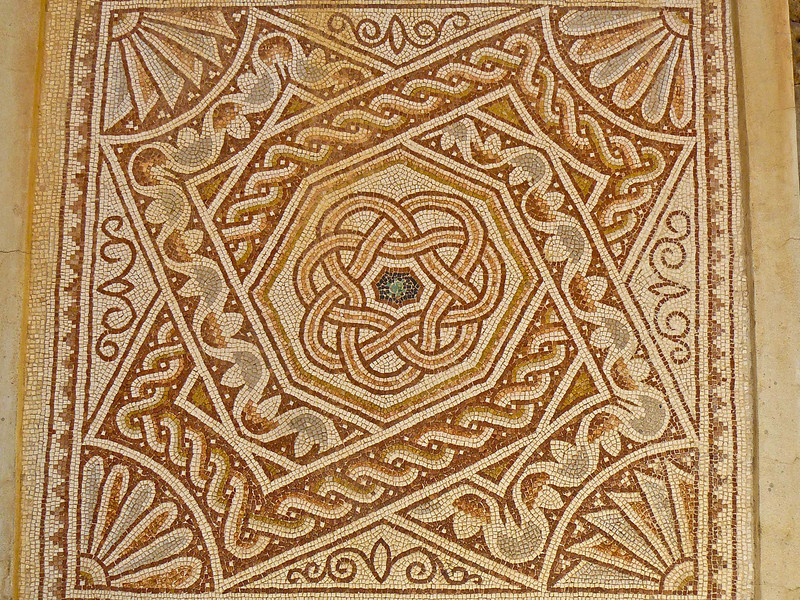
2nd century Roman mosaic in Roman Theatre at Bosra with curvilinear knot patterns

The girih style of ornamentation is thought to have been inspired by 2nd century AD Syrian Roman knotwork patterns. Its mathematical patterns, structured around multiple lines of symmetry, are based on innovations in mathematics that occurred in the Islamic world after the ninth century. These had curvilinear interlaced strapwork with three-fold rotational symmetry. The Umayyad Mosque (709–715) in Damascus, Syria has window screens made of interlacing undulating strapwork in the form of six-pointed stars. Early examples of Islamic geometric patterns made of straight strap lines can be seen in the architecture of the surviving gateway of the Ribat-i Malik caravanserai, Uzbekistan, built in 1078. The wide application of girih in architecture reflects the close relationship between Islamic architecture, geometry, and craft. Architecture was classified in the field of practical geometry in the early Islamic period, and building projects always involve a muhandis (geometer).

=== Early Islamic forms ===
The earliest form of girih on a book is seen in the frontispiece of a Quran manuscript from the year 1000, found in Baghdad. It is illuminated with interlacing octagons and thuluth calligraphy.

In woodwork, one of the earliest surviving examples of Islamic geometric art is the 13th-century minbar (pulpit) of the Mosque of Ibn Tulun, Cairo. Girih patterns can be created in woodwork in two different ways. In one, a wooden grille with polygons and stars is created; the holes can be left as they are, or filled with some material. In the other, called gereh-chini small wooden panels of geometric shapes are created individually, and combined to create an elaborate design.

In 10th century a systematic investigation of geometric patterns was conducted by Persian mathematician and astronomer Abu al-Wafa' Buzjani in the House of Wisdom. In his treatise A Book on Those Geometric Constructions Which Are Necessary for a Craftsman, he explained the geometric structure and illustrates the methods of drawing polygons within other shapes (mostly circles) for craftsmen and artisans. This book laid the groundwork for designing girih by explaining fundamental grammar for construction girih patterns.

The term "girih" was used in Turkish for polygonal strap patterns in architecture as early as the late 15th century. In the same period, artisans compiled girih pattern books such as the Topkapı Scroll.

While curvilinear precedents of girih were seen in the 10th century, fully developed girih patterns were not seen before the 11th century in Iran. It became a dominant design element in the 11th and 12th centuries, as in the carved stucco panels with interlaced girih of the Kharraqan towers (1067) near Qazvin, Iran. Stylized plant decorations were sometimes co-ordinated with girih.

After the Safavid period, the use of girih continued in the Seljuq dynasty and the Ilkhanate. In the 14th century, girih became a minor element in the decorative arts; it was largely replaced by vegetal patterns during the Timurid dynasty, but continued to be important in decorative arts in Central Asian monuments after that time.

== Construction ==
A girih pattern based on a hexagonal overlapping circles grid that can be drawn with compass and straight edge

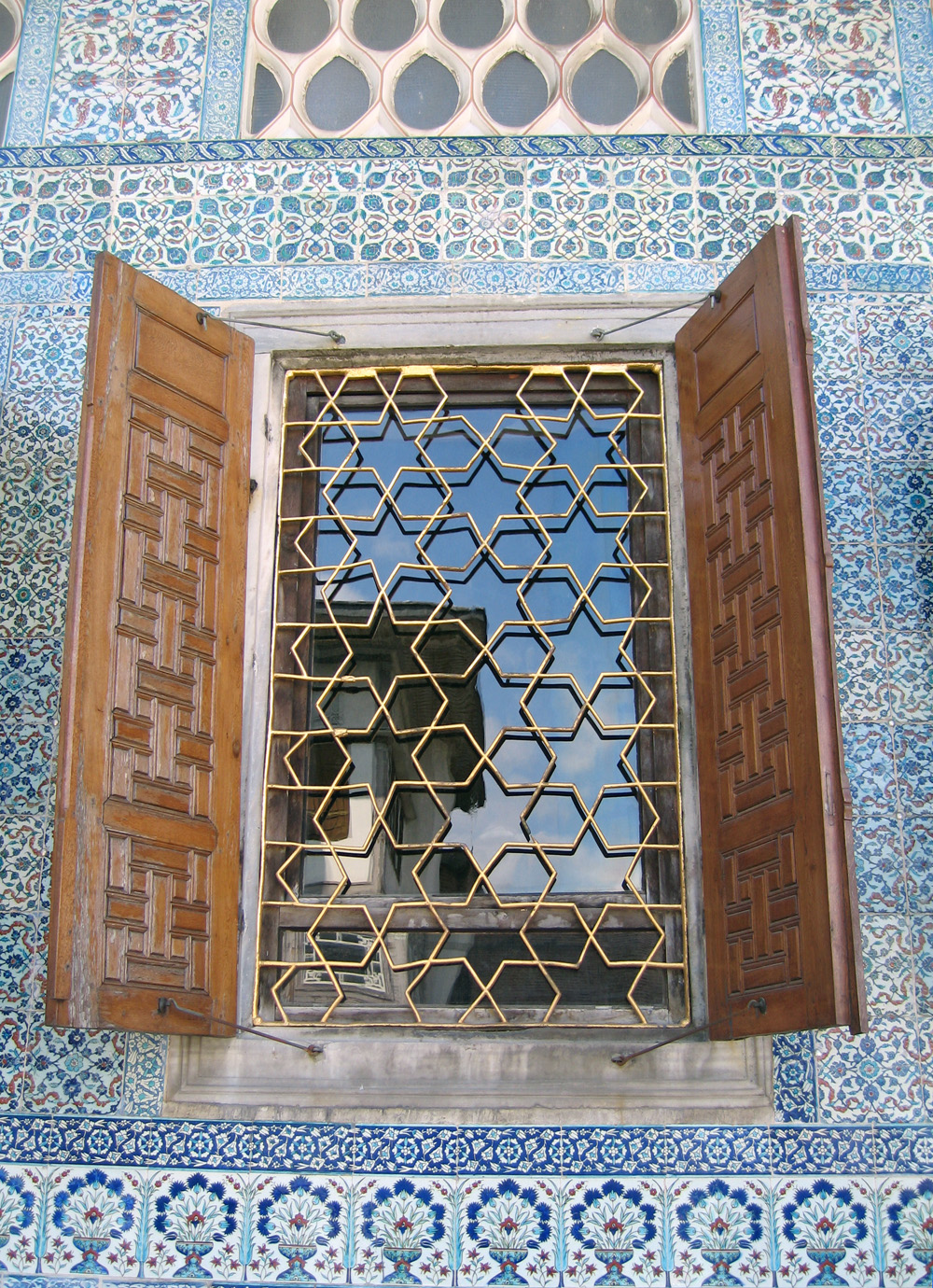
A window cage at the Topkapı Palace, built with this girih pattern

=== Compass and straight edge ===
Girih consists of geometric designs, often of stars and polygons, which can be constructed in a variety of ways. Girih star and polygon patterns with 5- and 10-fold rotational symmetry are known to have been made as early as the 13th century. Such figures can be drawn by compass and straightedge. The first girih patterns were made by copying a pattern template on a regular grid; the pattern was drawn with compass and straightedge. Today, artisans using traditional techniques use a pair of dividers to leave an incision mark on a paper sheet that has been left in the sun to make it brittle. Straight lines are drawn with a pencil and an unmarked straightedge. (Note: Eric Broug's Islamic Geometric Patterns illustrates many such patterns, and (in the Appendix) gives detailed instructions for their construction using only compass and straightedge.) Girih patterns made this way are based on tessellations, tiling the plane with a unit cell and leaving no gaps. Because the tiling makes use of translation and rotation operations, the unit cells need to have 2-, 3-, 4- or 6-fold rotational symmetry.

=== Polygons in contact ===
One of the early Western students of Islamic patterns, Ernest Hanbury Hankin, defined a "geometrical arabesque" as a pattern formed "with the help of construction lines consisting of polygons in contact." He observed that many different combinations of polygons can be used as long as the residual spaces between the polygons are reasonably symmetrical. For example, a grid of octagons in contact has squares (of the same side as the octagons) as the residual spaces. Every octagon is the basis for an 8-point star, as seen at Akbar's tomb in Agra (1605–1613). Hankin considered the "skill of the Arabian artists in discovering suitable combinations of polygons ... almost astounding."

Girih tiles

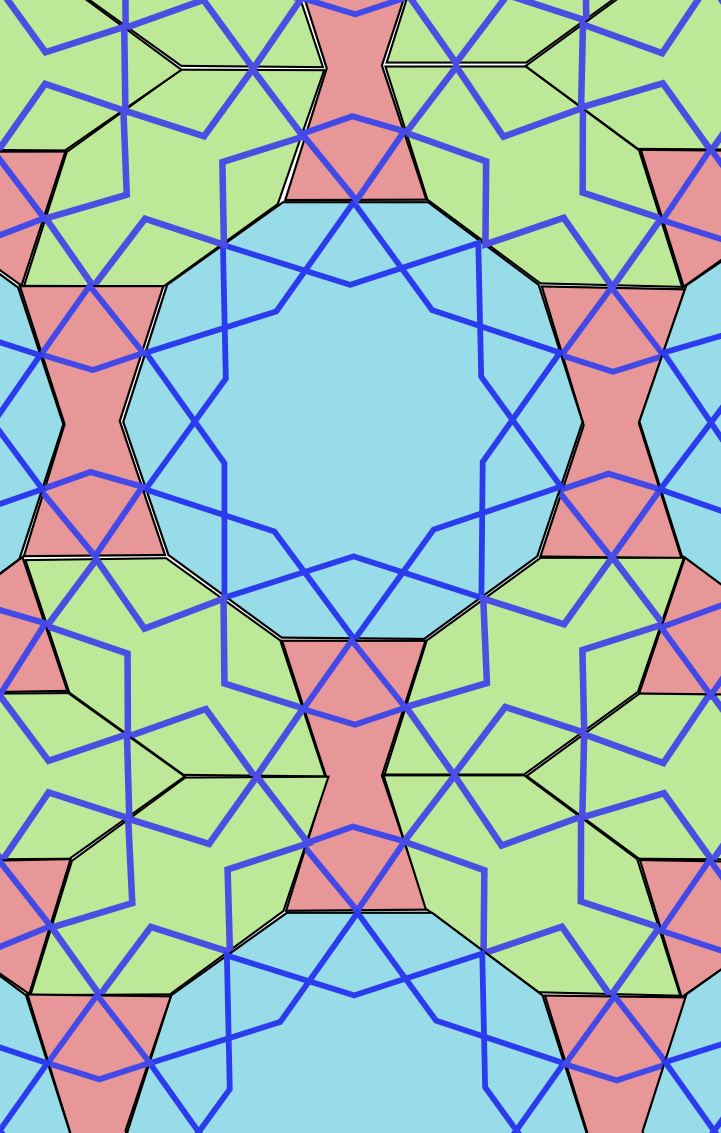
A pattern made from these tiles

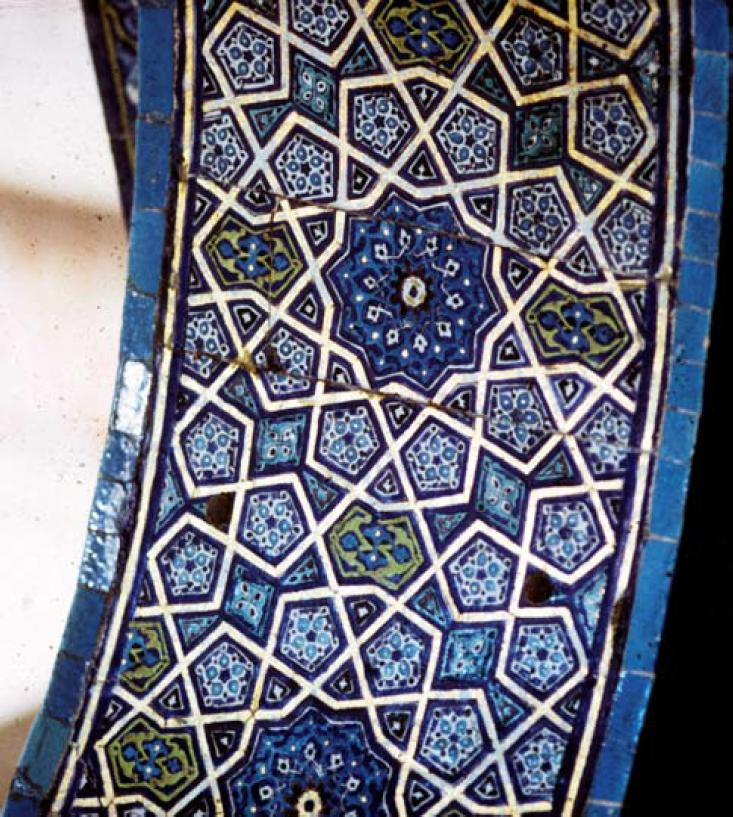
Detail of Green Mosque, Bursa using this girih pattern

=== Girih tiles ===
By the 15th century, some girih patterns were no longer periodic, and may have been constructed using girih tiles. This method is based on a set of five tiles with lines drawn on them; when used to tile the plane with no gaps, the lines on the tiles form a girih pattern. It is not yet known when girih tiles were first used for architectural decoration instead of compass and straightedge, but it was probably at the start of the 13th century. Methods of ornamentation were extremely diverse, however, and the idea that one method was used for all of them has been criticised as anachronistic.

=== Two-level design ===
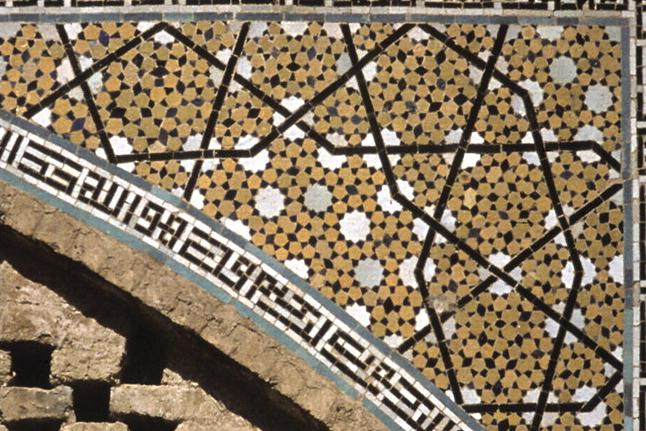
Girih pattern on a spandrel from the Darb-e Imam, Isfahan, Iran

Reconstruction of the larger-scale thick line pattern with larger tiles, and a spandrel in yellow

Subdivision rule for the spandrel's pattern

The girih patterns on the Darb-e Imam shrine built in 1453 at Isfahan had a much more complex pattern than any previously seen. The details of the pattern indicate that girih tiles, rather than compass and straightedge, were used for decorating the shrine. The patterns appear aperiodic; within the area on the wall where they are displayed, they do not form a regularly repeating pattern; and they are drawn at two different scales. A large-scale pattern is discernible when the building is viewed from a distance, and a smaller-scale pattern forming part of the larger one can be seen from closer up.

Although there is evidence that some ancient girih tilings used a subdivision rule to draw a two-level pattern, there are no known historic examples that can be repeated an infinite level of times. For example, the pattern used in the spandrel of the Darb-i Imam shrine (see figure) consists only of decagons and bowties, while the subdivision rule uses an elongated hexagon tile alongside these two shapes. Therefore, this design lacks self-similarity between the two levels.

==== Aperiodicity ====
A periodic tiling of the plane is the regular repetition of a "unit cell", in the manner of a wallpaper, without any gaps. Such tilings can be seen as a two-dimensional crystal, and because of the crystallographic restriction theorem, the unit cell is restricted to a rotational symmetry of 2-fold, 3-fold, 4-fold, and 6-fold. It is therefore impossible to tile the plane periodically with a figure that has five-fold rotational symmetry, such as a five-pointed star or a decagon. Patterns with infinite perfect quasi-periodic translational order can have crystallographically forbidden rotational symmetries such as pentagonal or decagonal shapes. These quasicrystal tilings contain shapes with five-fold symmetry that repeat periodically in between other shapes that do not repeat.

One way to create quasi-periodic patterns is to create a Penrose tiling. Girih tiles can be subdivided into Penrose tiles called "dart" and "kite", but there is no evidence that this approach was used by medieval artisans. Another way to create quasiperiodic patterns is by subdividing girih tiles repeatedly into smaller tiles using a subdivision rule. In the limit the plane would be divided into girih tiles that repeat with frequencies that are aperiodic. The use of such a subdivision rule would serve as evidence that Islamic artisans of the 15th century were aware that girih tiles can produce complex patterns that never exactly repeat themselves. However, no known patterns made with girih tiles have more than a two-level design. There would have been no practical need for a girih pattern with more than two levels of design, as a third level would be either too large or too small to be perceived. It appears that medieval Islamic artisans were using a tool that had the potential of creating highly complex patterns, but they never realized it. As E. Makovicky argues,

The artisans were satisfied by creating a large fundamental domain without being concerned with the mathematical notion of indefinitely expandable quasiperiodic patterns. However, they understood and used to their advantage some of the local geometric properties of the quasi-crystalline patterns they constructed.

==== The Topkapı Scroll ====
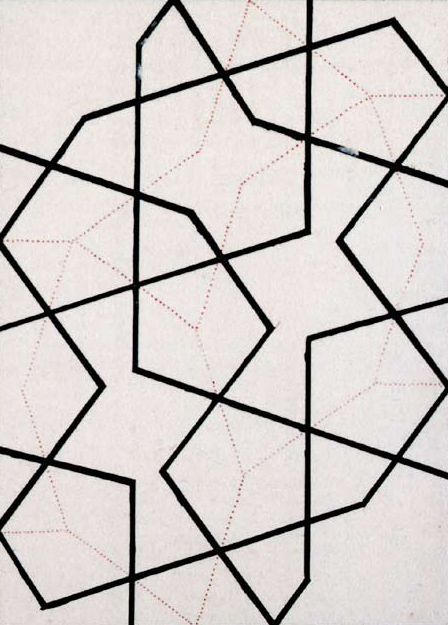
A Topkapı Scroll panel; featuring a girih pattern in black with red tiles

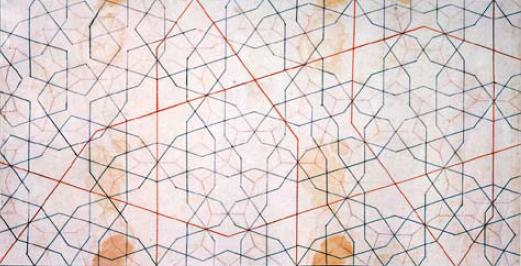
Topkapı scroll panel with patterns at two scales and tiles used

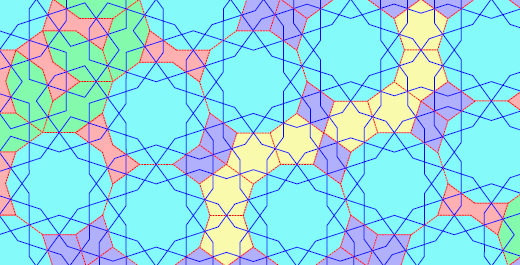
Reconstruction of the small scale pattern (thick black lines) in left panel, using small tiles

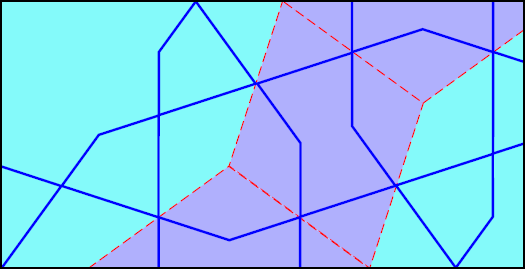
Reconstruction of the large scale pattern (thick red lines) in left panel, using large tiles

The Topkapı Scroll, from the late 15th century, documents the use of girih tiles to create girih patterns. The drawings in this pattern book show the girih lines superimposed on the tiles used to generate the pattern, making the construction fully evident.

=== Templates ===
Once a repeating pattern has been constructed, regardless of the method used, the pattern can be recreated by copying a repeating unit of it, like the pattern of a wallpaper, as a paper template. The pattern can then simply be pricked through on to the surface to be decorated. The Topkapı Scroll grids may well have been meant for use as such templates. The Anonymous Compendium contains square repeat units for many girih patterns. Ibn al-Razzaz al-Jazari's Compendium of Science and Useful Practice in the Mechanical Arts contains explicit templates for special purposes such as cast bronze doors.

== In varied materials ==
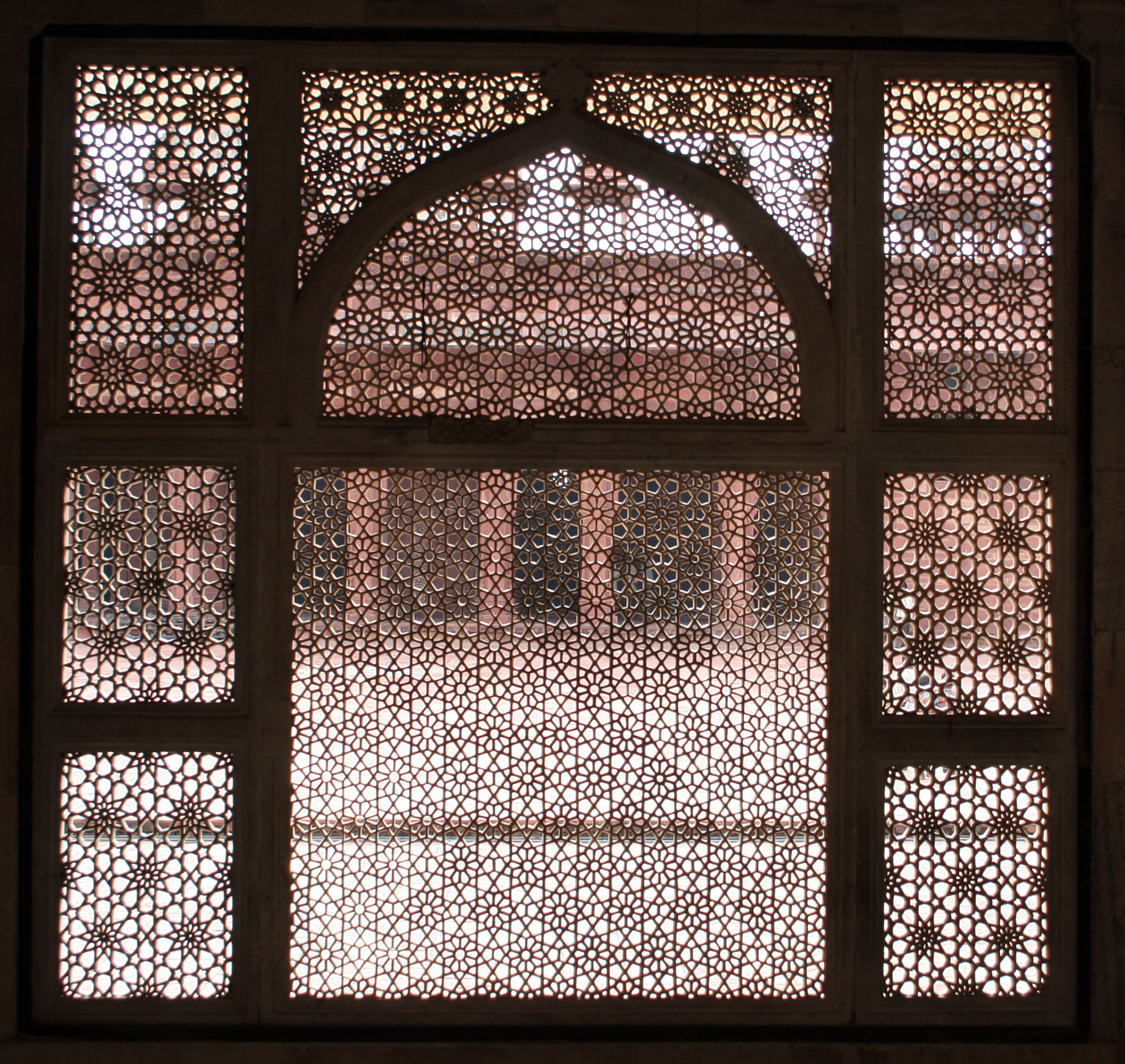
Girih stone screens at the tomb of Salim Chishti, Fatehpur Sikri, 16th century

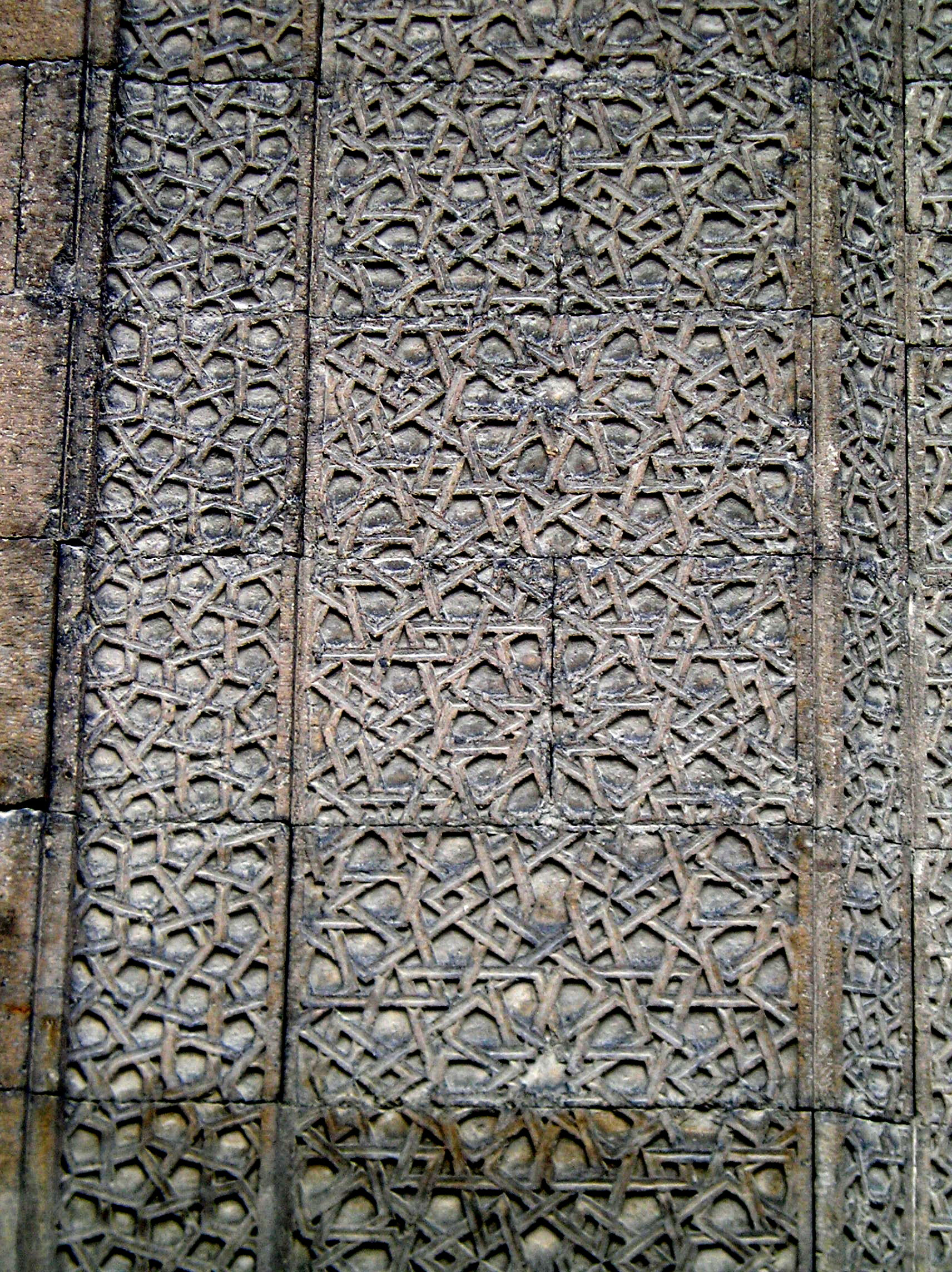
Girih in plasterwork of Iwan of Hunat Hatun Complex, Kayseri

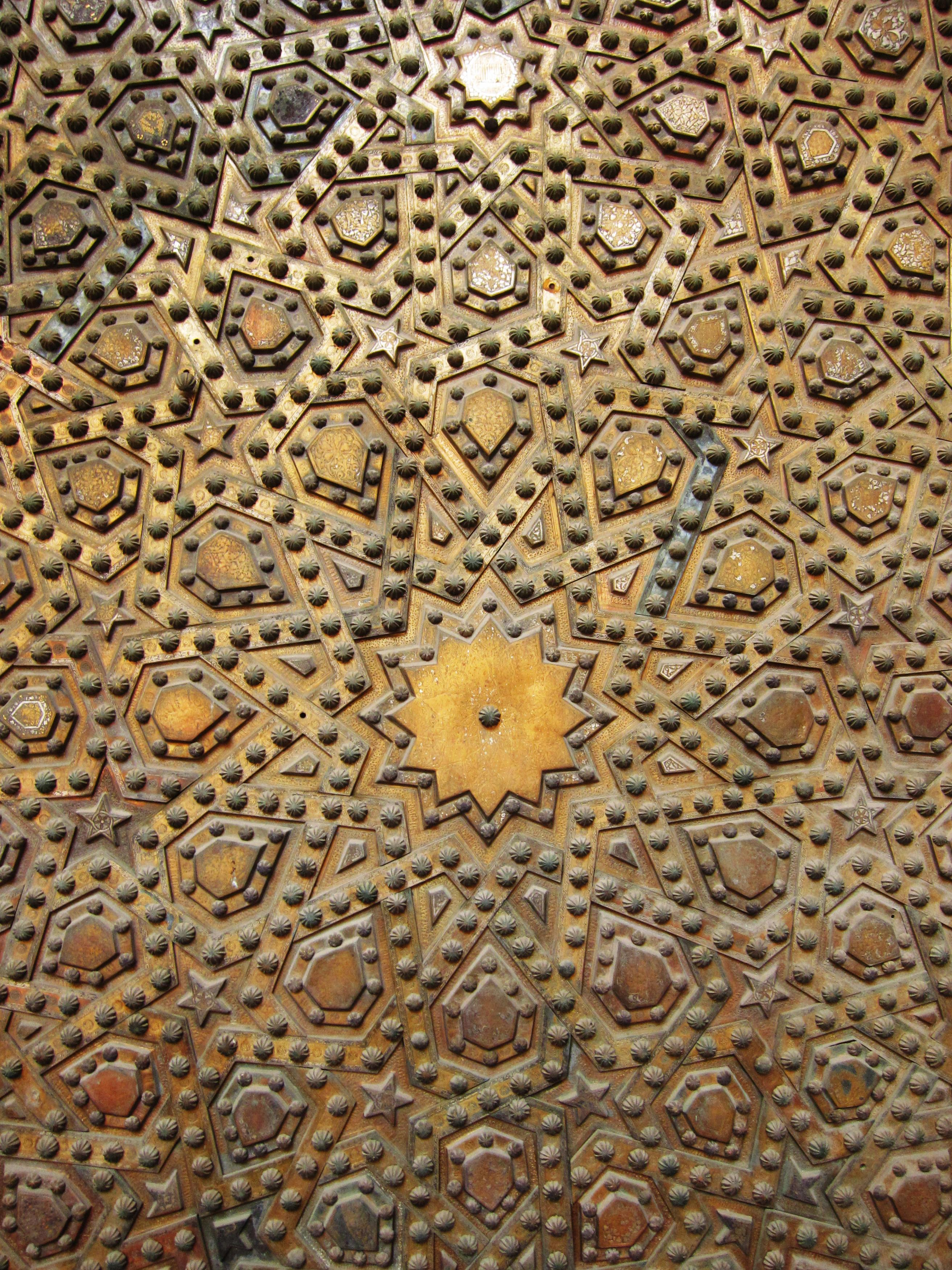
Girih in metal: 12-pointed star on gate at Sultan Hassan's mosque, Cairo

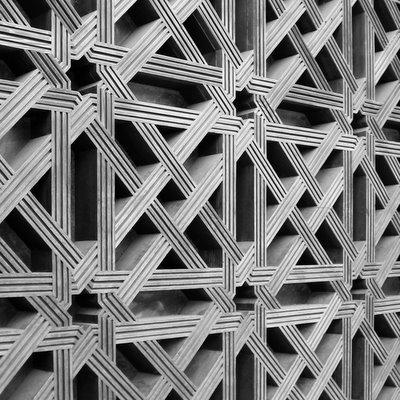
Girih in wood: grille in the Great Mosque of Cordoba

== Applications ==
=== On windows ===
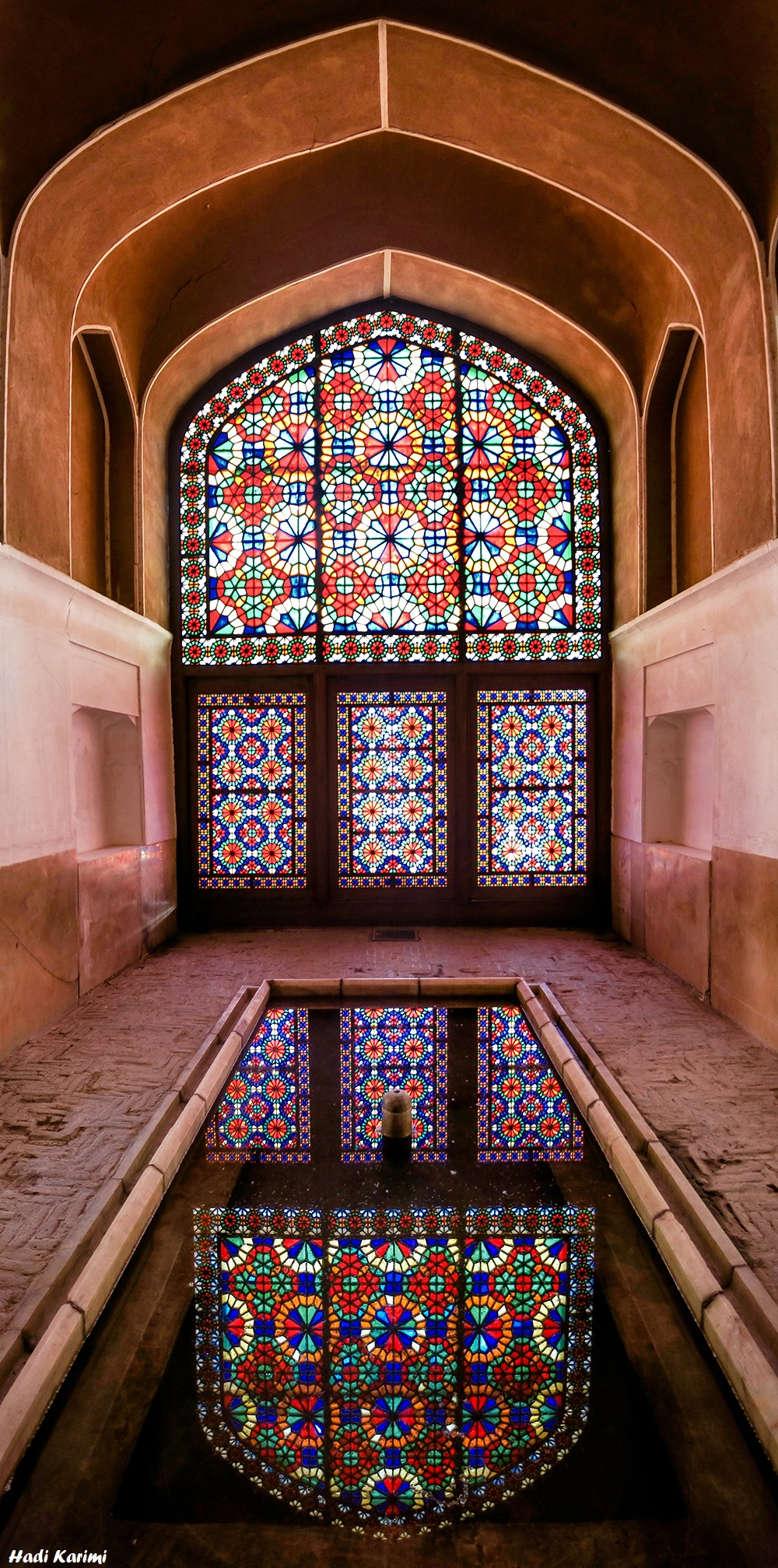
Colourful window of Dowlad Abad Garden

Girih has been widely applied in architecture. The patterns on the Persian geometric windows meet the need of the Persian architecture, as the ornateness of windows indicated the social and economic status of the owner. A good example is Azad Koliji, a pavilion in Dowlatabad Garden in Iran. With the girih patterns on its window, the architects manage to demonstrate multiple layers. The first layer is the actual garden which people can see when they open the window. And the second layer is the artificial garden as the girih patterns are on the outside of the window is the carved pattern and a colorful glass is below it which creates an illusion of a beautiful garden. The multi-colour layer create a sense of a mass of flowers. The artificial layer is abstract which forms a clear contradiction with the real layer outside the window and gives the audience enough space of imagination.

=== On domes ===
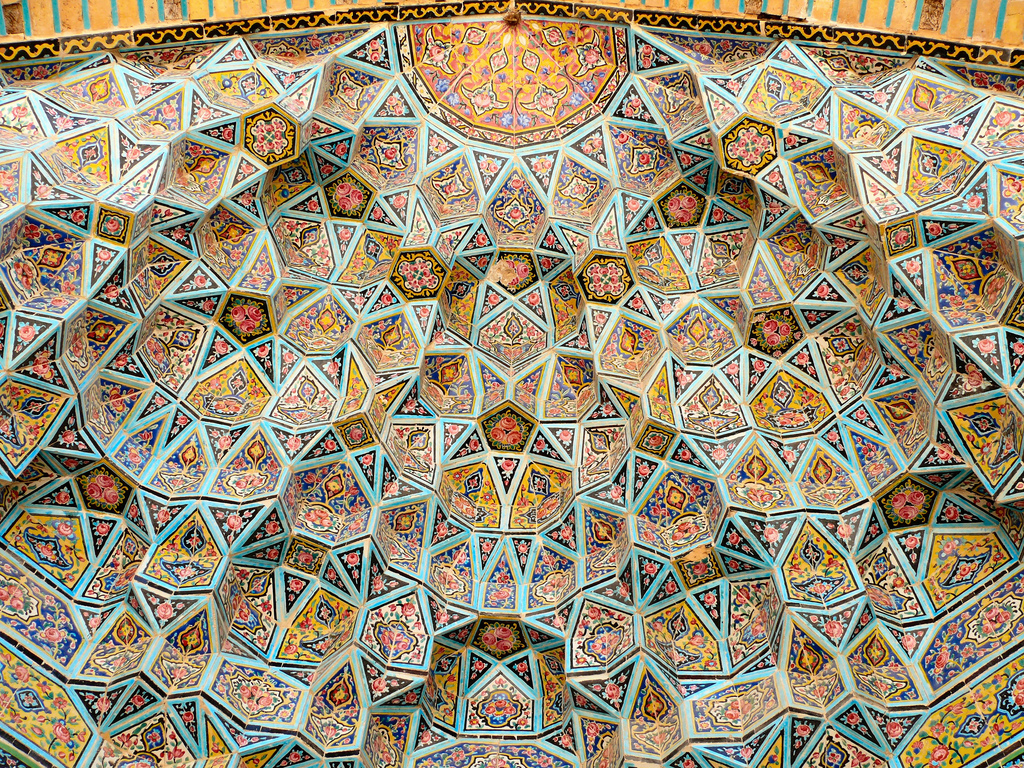
Nasir-ol-Molk Mosque vault ceiling

Girih patterns are widely used on domes. Due to the curve shapes of the domes, they need special techniques. One of the most important techniques is called “Dast-Garden” method. This method refers to that the number of star polygons applied to the pattern are highly dependent on the change of the dome curvature. Decreasing the curvature of a dome surface leads to the decreasing of the number of points on a star polygon. Thus, the shapes of the girih pattern are heavily relying on the dome.

=== On walls ===
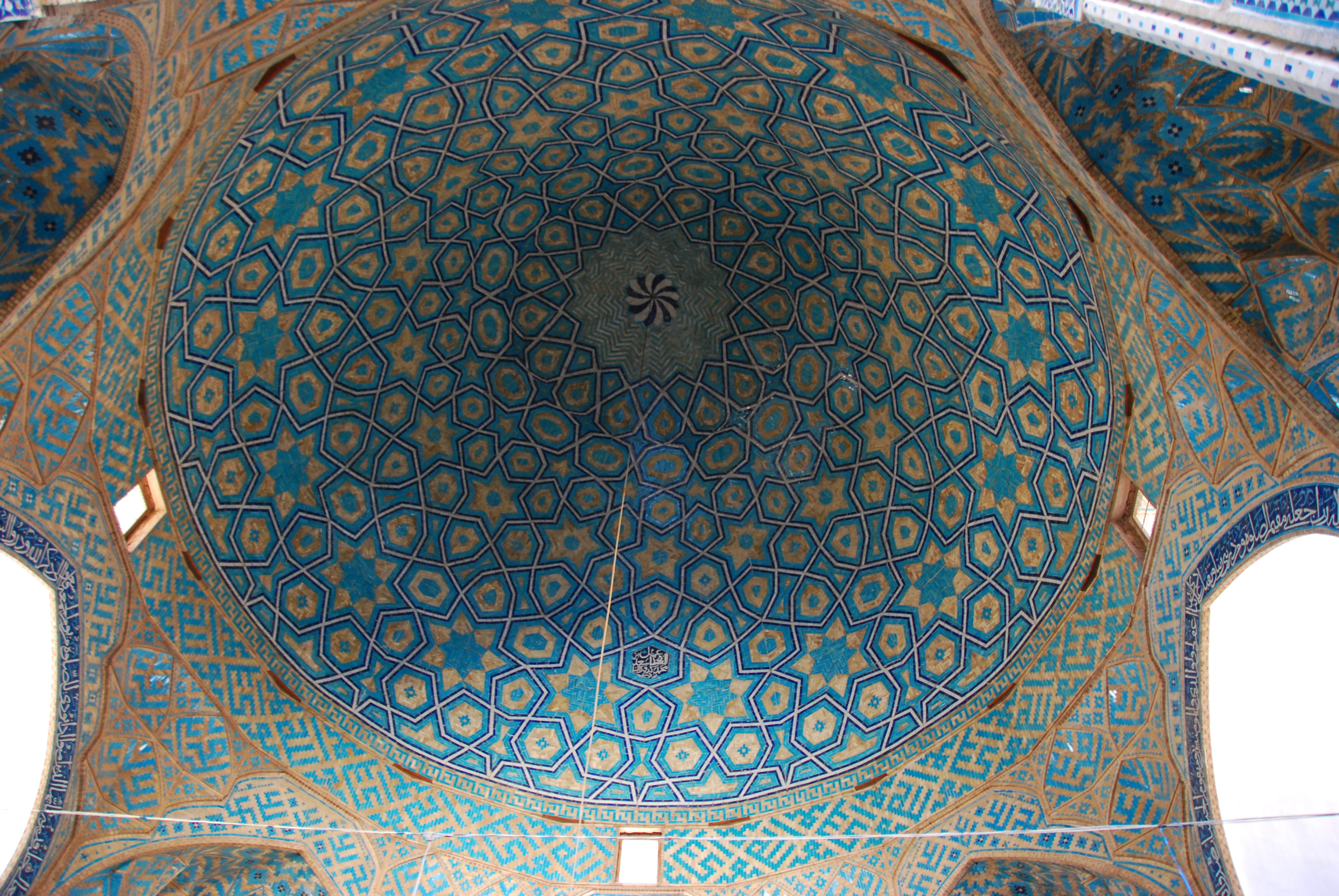
Dome of Jameh Mosque of Yazd

Girih patterns are all over the walls of some Islamic architectures. The decorating lines connect to each other and form a continuous network across the entire tiling with edges combine. In addition, girih patterns vary a lot on the surface, with different geometric shapes including decagons, hexagons, bowties and rhombuses. Among all these patterns, a special technique is shared: "self-similar transformation". The mapping is completed by using this freedom to eliminate the edge difference of these patterns and reduce the edge mismatches to the lowest degree. The extensive use of Girih for interior decoration corresponds to Islam belief. The repetitive patterns of Girih are capable of expanding in every direction, thus Girih has an indefinite nature. This characteristic resembles Muslim's belief that human, who is not the measure of the world, can never comprehend the "infinite meaning of the world" created by the un-definable god. The Girih patterns also have visual function of helping viewers to transcend the monocular vision as the viewers shifting their views according to the underlying schemes.

== See also ==
- Islamic interlace patterns
- Muqarnas
- Topkapi Scroll
