= Peter Lu =

American-Canadian post doctoral-researcher

Peter J. Lu
- Born: 1978 (age 47–48); Cleveland, Ohio, U.S.
- Education: Harvard University; Princeton University
- Known for: Contributions in the fields of girih tiles, quasicrystals, Islamic architecture, Chinese archaeology, soft condensed matter physics
- Scientific career
- Fields: Physicist
- Workplaces: Harvard University
- Doctoral advisor: David A. Weitz
- Other academic advisors: Kenneth S. Deffeyes; Paul M. Chaikin; Paul J. Steinhardt

Peter James Lu, PhD (陸述義) is a post-doctoral research fellow in the Department of Physics and the School of Engineering and Applied Sciences at Harvard University in Cambridge, Massachusetts. He has been recognized for his discoveries of quasicrystal patterns (girih tiles) in medieval Islamic architecture, early precision compound machines in ancient China, and man's first use of diamond in neolithic China.

== Early life and education ==
Lu was born in Cleveland, Ohio and grew up in the Philadelphia suburb of West Chester, Pennsylvania. His early childhood interest in rockhounding led to his winning national gold medals in the "Rocks, Minerals, and Fossils" event at four National Science Olympiad tournaments. Lu graduated from B. Reed Henderson high school in West Chester in 1996.

Lu matriculated at Princeton University in September, 1996, and was advised in his first year by geology professor Kenneth S. Deffeyes. He studied organic chemistry with Maitland Jones, Jr., with whom Lu published his first paper on his freshman summer research project about carbenes. As an undergraduate physics major, he wrote his fourth-year senior thesis with Prof. Paul J. Steinhardt on the search for natural quasicrystals, later published in Physical Review Letters. Lu graduated summa cum laude and Phi Beta Kappa with an A.B. in physics from Princeton in June, 2000. In September, 2000, he began his graduate studies at Harvard University, receiving an A. M. in physics in 2002. In 2005, Lu presented a set of lectures in Turkmenistan. Since 2007, Lu has served on the national advisory committee of the Science Olympiad. Lu completed his Ph.D. in physics in 2008.

== Girih tiles and quasicrystals in medieval Islamic architecture ==
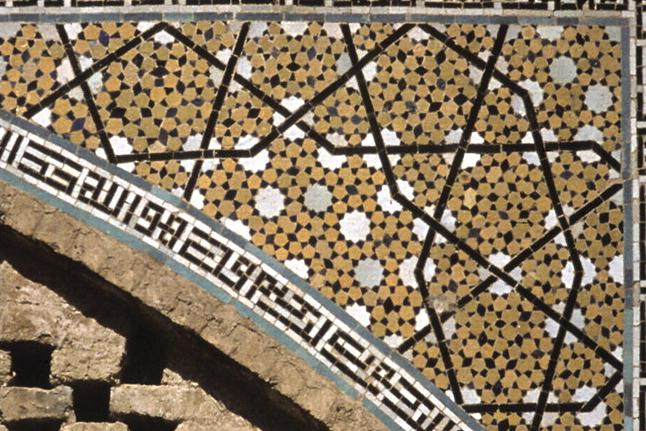
Girih tiles on the walls of Darb-i Imam

Lu's most widely publicized work involves his discovery of the girih tiles, a set of fundamental geometric tiles used to create a wide range of patterns in medieval Islamic architecture. In collaboration with Paul Steinhardt, he demonstrated their use to create quasicrystal tilings on the walls of Darb-i Imam shrine (1453 A.D.) in Isfahan, Iran. The finding was considered a significant breakthrough by demonstrating a simple and straightforward method that could have been used by common workers to create extremely complicated patterns using girih tiles, and by identifying a medieval example of quasicrystalline patterns, which were not widely known to or understood by the West until the discovery of Penrose tilings by Roger Penrose in the 1970s. For its timely scientific and political implications, Lu and Steinhardt's work on medieval Islamic architectural tilings received substantial worldwide coverage on the front pages of a number of major newspapers, on the radio, and in magazines; the finding was identified as among the top 100 scientific discoveries of 2007 by Discover magazine.

== Technology in ancient Chinese art ==
=== Earliest precision compound machines ===
In 2004, Lu presented evidence in a single-author paper in Science that ancient Chinese craftsmen during the Spring and Autumn period used precision compound machines to craft spiral grooves on Chinese jade burial rings; Lu had been introduced earlier to the grooved rings by Prof. Jenny So at the Smithsonian Institution. Lu discovered that these grooves follow the exact mathematical form of the Archimedes spiral, demonstrating the ability of ancient craftsmen to interconvert two types of motion precisely, in order to fashion the jade rings. The close conformity to this mathematical form confirmed that these craftsmen must have had a precision compound machine (as opposed to a simple machine) in 550 BC, predating Archimedes by several centuries; prior to this paper, the earliest compound machines were thought to be of Greek origin (e.g., Archimedes' screw).

=== Man's first use of diamond ===
Lu continued his interdisciplinary combination of art history and physics with his discovery, with a group of collaborators, of man's first use of diamond, in Neolithic China. Prior to this work, evidence for man's first use of diamond was known primarily from Indian texts dating to the latter half of the first millennium BC, and there was no reported evidence for its use in prehistoric times. In 2005, Lu and collaborators reported strong evidence that the ancient Chinese used diamonds to polish ceremonial stone burial axes as early as 2500 BC, placing the earliest known use of diamond two thousand years before the mineral is known to have been used elsewhere. These stone axes, made predominantly of the mineral corundum (sapphire and ruby in its colorful gem forms) were fashioned as early as 4000 BC, so that they represent the earliest use of the mineral corundum, as well. The finding's media coverage included a front-page article in China's largest English-language newspaper, the China Daily.

== Other contributions ==
Lu's interests in geology-related phenomena also include paleontology, which led to collaboration with his college and grad-school roommate Motohiro Yogo and Prof. Charles Marshall. Leveraging vector autoregression analysis upon an established marine fossil record, Lu, Yogo and Marshall found that a "speed limit", which was previously thought to restrict the reemergence of biodiversity following a mass extinction, may be an artifact of the incompleteness of the fossil record. According to paleontologist Douglas Erwin of the National Museum of Natural History in Washington, D.C., "This is the battle line for the next decade in paleontology." Lu's research in the group of Prof. David A. Weitz focused on the behavior of attractive colloidal particles in the laboratory and in the microgravity environment of the International Space Station. In 2008, Lu, Weitz and collaborators in Rome combined experiment and computer simulations to demonstrate that the onset of colloidal gelation is triggered by a form of phase separation known as spinodal decomposition, resolving a long-standing debate within the soft condensed-matter physics community on the origins of this mechanism. Lu's colloid work has also led to the development of new techniques for observing real-time, three-dimensional behavior of colloidal particles, and freely-moving biological cells, with active target-locking in real-time confocal microscopy. Lu also wrote the opening chapter, on confocal microscopy and nanotechnology, of the Handbook of Microscopy for Nanotechnology, edited by Nan Yao.

== See also ==
- Girih tiles
- Penrose tiles
