= Imamzadeh Haroun-e-Velayat =

Mausoleum and shrine in Isfahan, Iran

- هارون ولایت
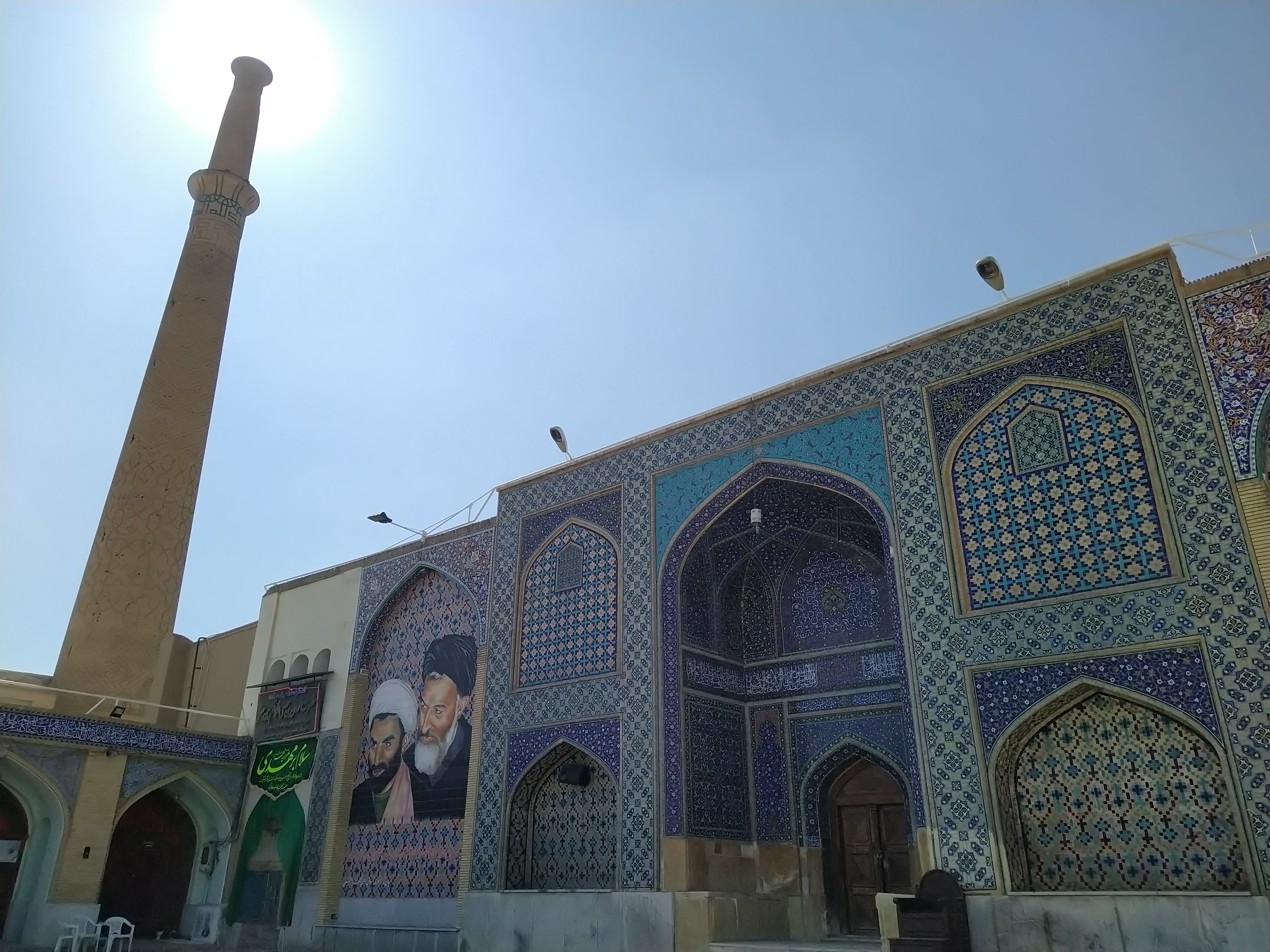
- The northern sahn of the imamzadeh, in 2016

- Location of the complex in Iran

Religion
- Affiliation: Shia Islam
- Ecclesiastical or organisational status: Imamzadeh, mausoleum, and madrasa
- Status: Active

Location
- Location: Esfahan, Isfahan province
- Country: Iran
- Interactive map of Imamzadeh Haroun-e-Velayat
- Coordinates: 32°39′57″N 51°40′58″E

Architecture
- Architect: Mirza Shah Husayn
- Type: Islamic architecture
- Style: Isfahani; Safavid; Qajar (renovations)
- Founder: Ismail I
- Completed: 1513 CE; 19th century (sahn); 1911 (iwan, east); 1993 (zarih)

Specifications
- Interior area: 2,500 m^{2} (27,000 sq ft)
- Dome: One (maybe more)
- Dome height (outer): 23 m (75 ft)
- Shrine: One: Harun Vilayat
- Materials: Stone; adobe; bricks; plaster; tiles
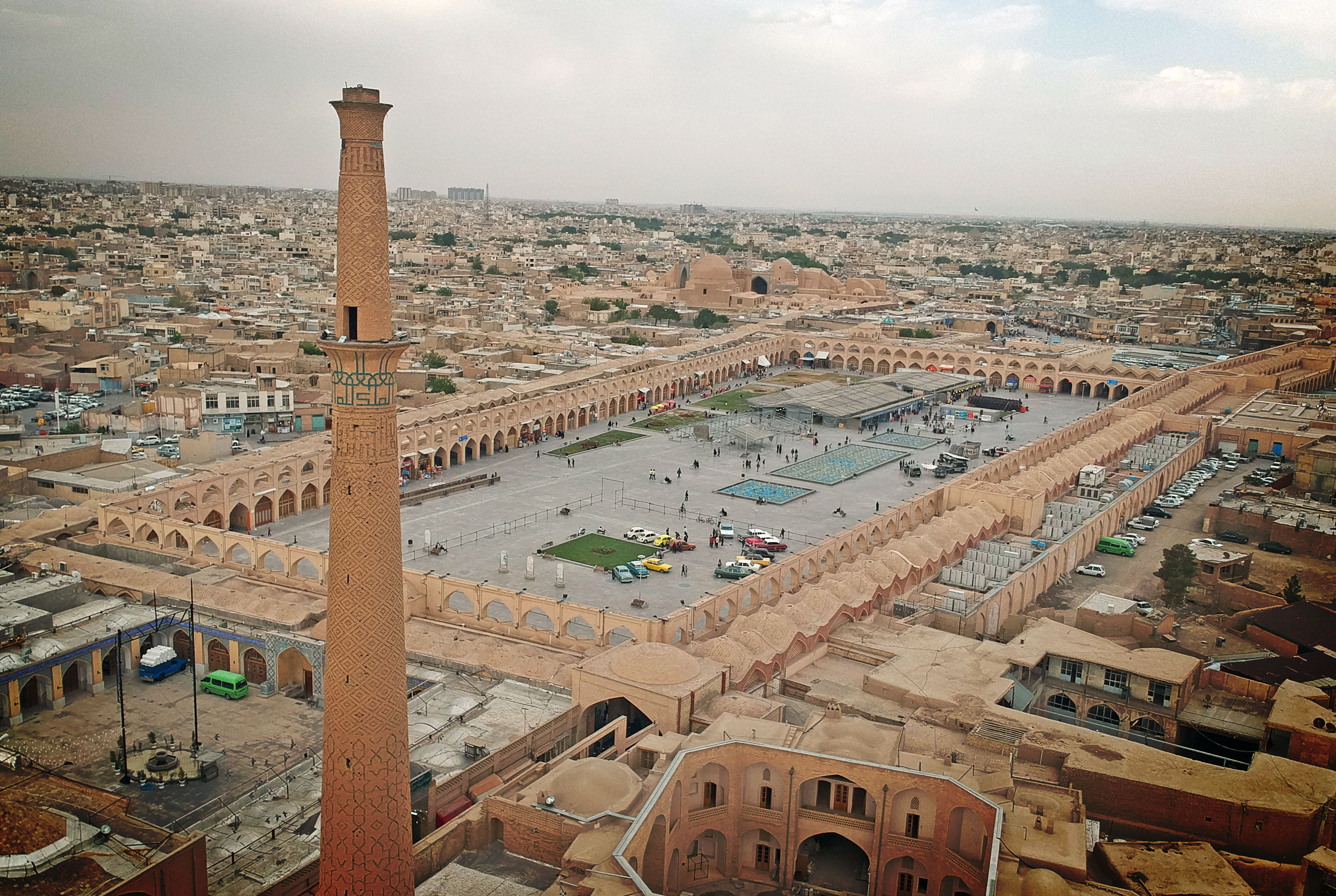
- The complex's northern sahn (bottom left), Ali minaret and Kohneh Square (center), and Jameh Mosque of Isfahan (top)

Iran National Heritage List
- Official name: Imamzadeh Haroun-e-Velayat
- Type: Emamzadeh
- Designated: 1934
- Reference no.: 220
- Conservation organization: Cultural Heritage, Handicrafts and Tourism Organization of Iran

The Imamzadeh Haroun-e-Velayat (Persian: هارون ولایت; Arabic: مرقد هارون ولايت), also known as the Harun-i Vilayat Mausoleum, is a Shia imamzadeh, mausoleum, and madrasa complex, located in the city of Esfahan, in the province of Isfahan, Iran. It is located opposite the Ali minaret in Dardasht and was completed in 1513 CE, during the Ismail I era, with subsequent renovations during the 19th and 20th centuries.

The complex was added to the Iran National Heritage List on 13 December 1934, administered by the Cultural Heritage, Handicrafts and Tourism Organization of Iran.

== Overview ==
There are many accounts of Harun Vilayat, the person who is buried in it. Some say that he is the seventh Imam's son and others, that he is the tenth Imam's son, but aside from the matter of who is buried in it, it is the most important historical structure related to the early Safavid era. Beyond the tomb it has also a portico, a tiled dome and a large sahn.

Repairs and improvements were carried out in the Fath-Ali Shah era.

The mausoleum has become a shrine reputed to have miraculous powers and is also venerated by some Armenian Christians.

== See also ==
- Shia Islam in Iran
- List of imamzadehs in Iran
- List of mausoleums in Iran
- Holiest sites in Shia Islam
