= Dardasht (Isfahan) =

Neighbourhood in Isfahan, Iran

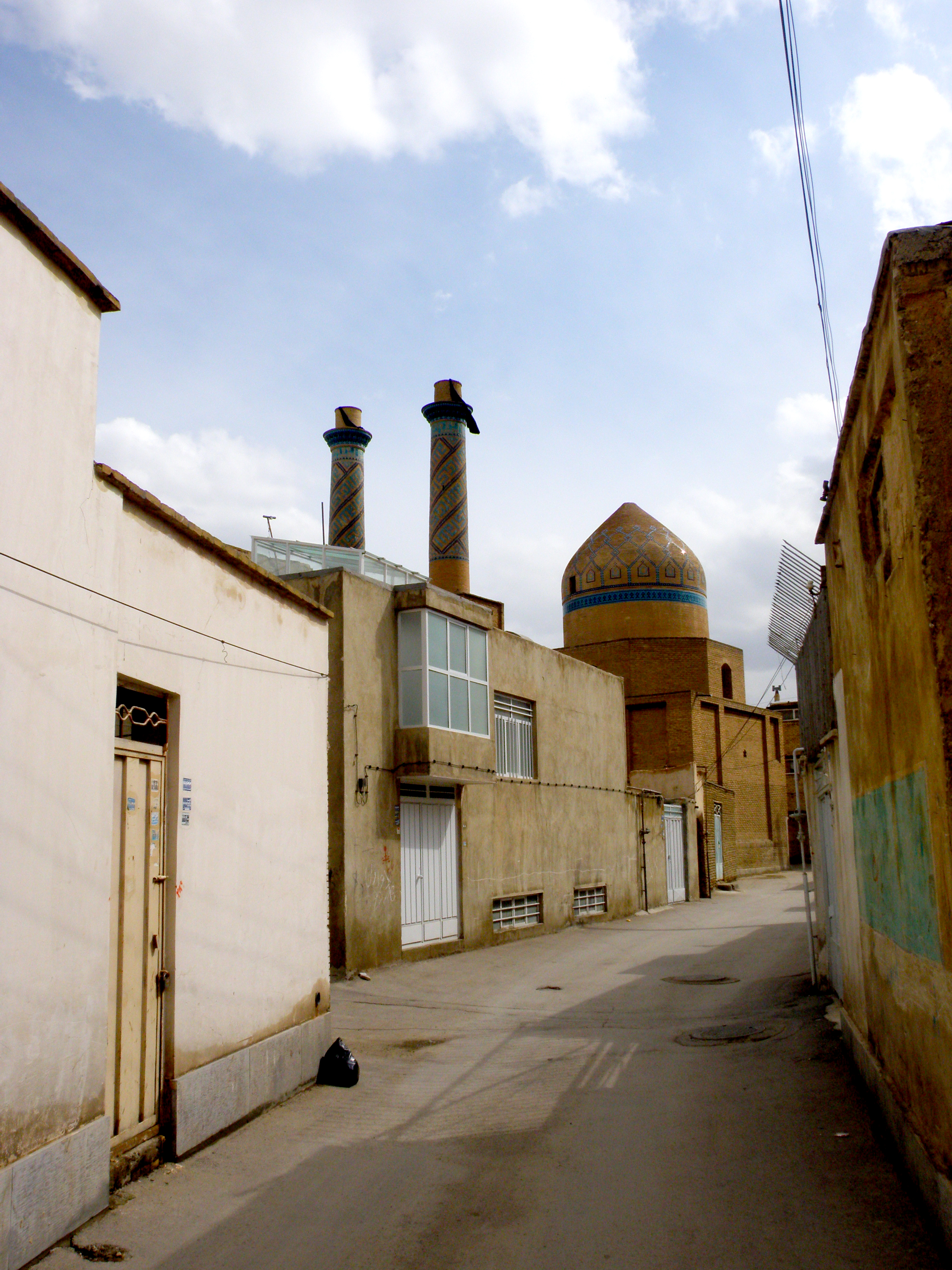
A street in Dardasht

Dardasht (Persian: دردشت) is a central neighbourhood of Isfahan, Iran. Formerly known as Babol-Dasht, it is known for its historical minarets, cemetery, the Darb-i Imam Shrine, dated to 1453/857 AH and the Harun-i Vilayat Mausoleum. The Dardasht quarter of Isfahan was one of the major Jewish quarters of the city.

== Notable people ==
- Yona Dardashti - master classical Persian vocalist
- Galeet Dardashti - descendant of Yona Dardashti, vocalist and anthropologist
