= Darb-e Imam =

Historic funerary complex in Isfahan, Iran

- امامزاده درب امام
- The mosque's northern iwan, built by the Qara Qoyunlu in 1453. The smaller greenish dome is a later Safavid addition

- Location of the complex in Iran

Religion
- Affiliation: Shia (Twelver)
- Ecclesiastical or organisational status: Imamzadeh, mosque and cemetery
- Status: Active

Location
- Location: Dardasht, Esfahan, Isfahan Province
- Country: Iran
- Coordinates: 32°40′08″N 51°40′38″E

Architecture
- Type: Mosque architecture
- Style: Timurid; Safavid; Qajar
- General contractor: Jalal al-Din Safarshah
- Completed: 1453 CE (first structure); 1602 CE (façade/renovation); 1671 CE (tholobate/renovation); 1715 CE (east iwan); 1996 (renovations)

Specifications
- Dome: Two
- Shrines: Two: Ibrahim al-Batha; Zayn al-Abidin
- Materials: Bricks; stone; clay

Iran National Heritage List
- Official name: Emamzadeh Darb-e Emam
- Type: Emamzadeh
- Designated: 1934
- Reference no.: 217
- Conservation organization: Cultural Heritage, Handicrafts and Tourism Organization of Iran

The Darb-e Imam (Persian: امامزاده درب امام) is a Twelver Shi'ite Imamzadeh complex located in the Dardasht quarter of Esfahan, in the province of Isfahan, Iran. The complex comprises two shrines, a mosque, a mausoleum, and a royal cemetery.

The complex was added to the Iran National Heritage List on 13 December 1934, administered by the Cultural Heritage, Handicrafts and Tourism Organization of Iran.

== History ==
The first building in the complex was built during the rule of the Qara Qoyunlu in 1453 CE, as an Imamzadeh shrine dedicated to two saints, "Ibrahim al-Batha" and "Zayn al-Abidin" who were believed to have been descendants of Ali ibn Abi Talib through Ja'far al-Sadiq. The construction of the Imamzadeh was ordered by the son of Jahan Shah, the ruler of Qara Qoyunlu at the time. After the Imamzadeh's construction was completed, many princes belonging to the Safavid dynasty were buried next to the place, along with princes of Mongol descent. A khanqah was also added to the complex during the reign of Aq Qoyunlu ruler, Ya'qub Beg. Later during the Safavid period, some repairs were made to the shrines. Extensive renovations were completed on the complex during 1995 and 1996.

== Architecture ==
There are girih tiles present in the mausoleum as well as other geometric patterns in the tilework and strongly resemble Penrose tilings, as discovered by Peter Lu.

== Burials ==
The site is believed to be the burial place of the saints Ibrahim al-Batha and Zayn al-Abidin, two descendants of Ja'far al-Sadiq. Local tradition relates that twelve other descendants of Ali ibn Abi Talib are buried in the complex but the locations of their graves are not known. Historically, the site includes the mausoleum of the wife of Qara Yusuf, who is also Jahan Shah's mother. A prince of Mongol descent, Mahmoud al-Afghani, is also buried in the funerary complex alongside other princes.

== Gallery ==
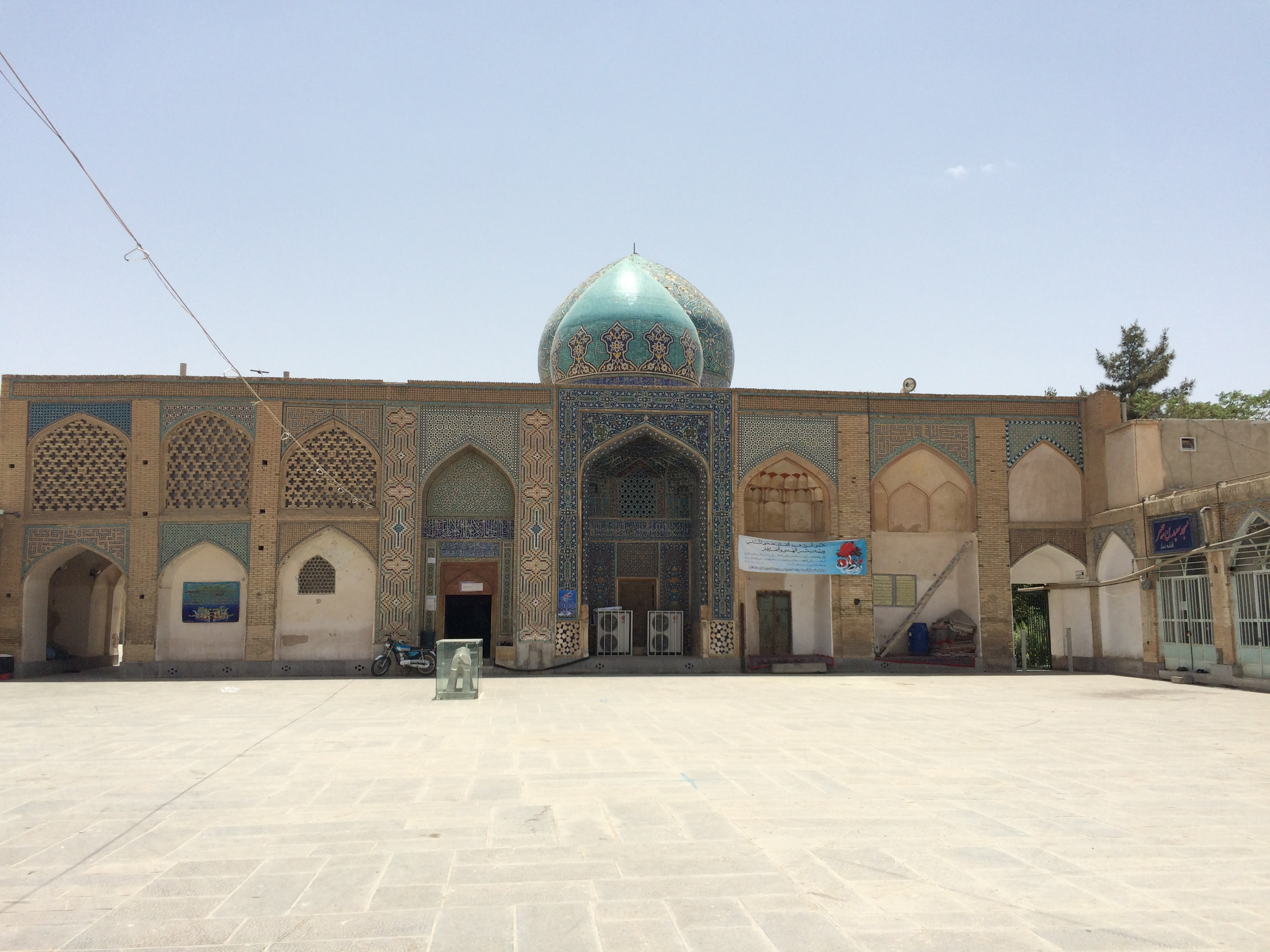
Wide view of the court

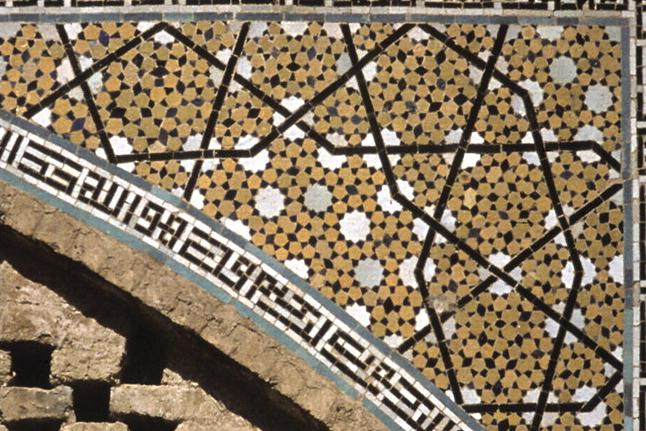
Example of the girih tiles, found in a corner of the building.

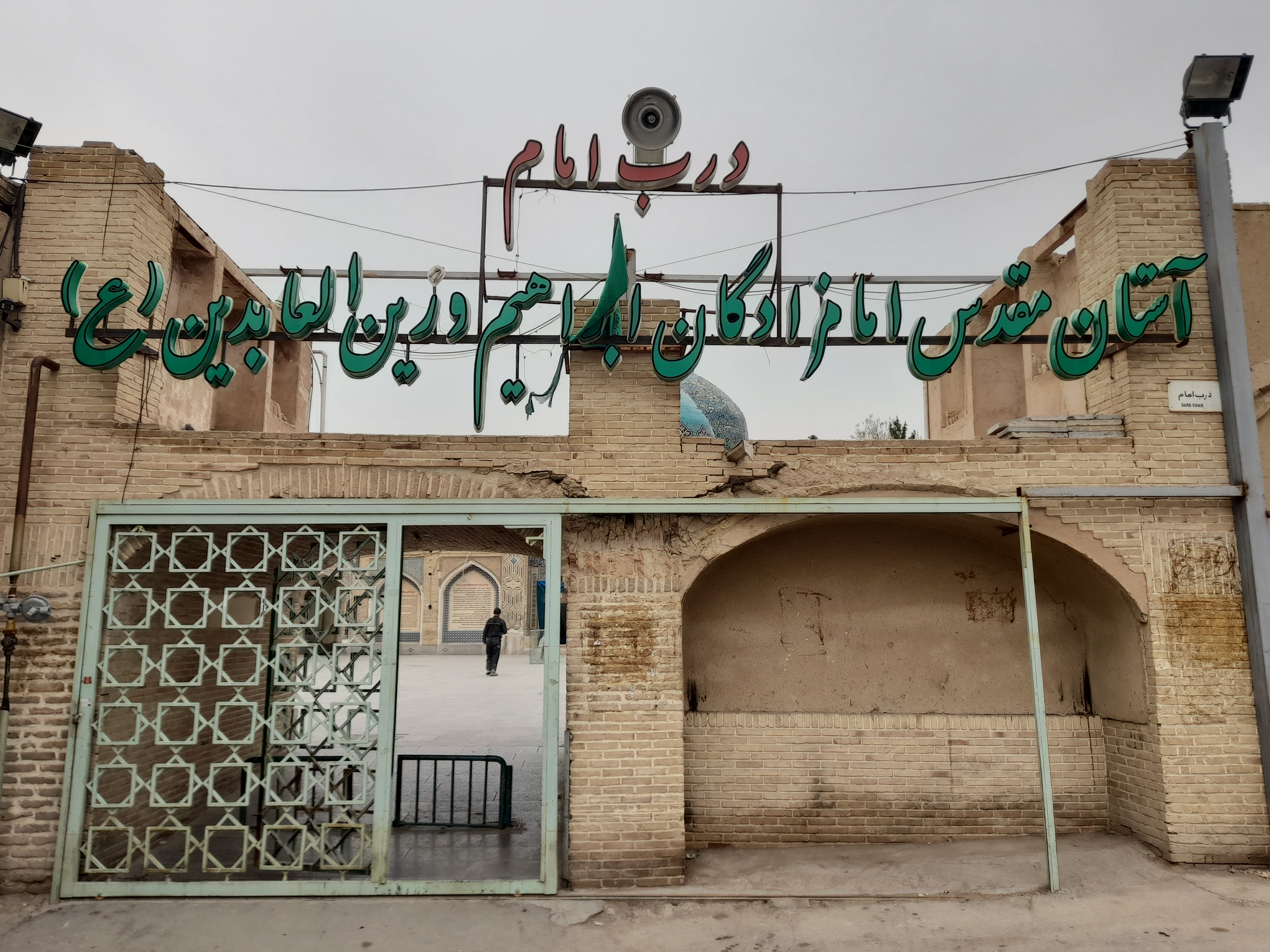
Entrance to the complex, in 2023

== See also ==
- Shia Islam in Iran
- List of mosques in Iran
- List of historical structures in Isfahan
- List of mausoleums in Iran
- List of imamzadehs in Iran
