= Alnwick (disambiguation) =

Alnwick is a town in Northumberland, England.

Alnwick may also refer to:

== Places ==
- Alnwick District, a former district in Northumberland, England
- Alnwick/Haldimand, Ontario, a township in Canada
- Alnwick Parish, New Brunswick, Canada
  - Alnwick, New Brunswick, a rural community in Alnwick Parish

== Other uses ==
- Alnwick (surname)

== See also ==
- Alnwick Castle
  - The Alnwick Garden
- Battle of Alnwick (disambiguation)
- Annick (disambiguation)
- Anick, a village in Northumberland.
