= Annick =

Annick may refer to:

- Alnwick, Northumberland, England (pronounced "Annick")
- MV Annick, a coaster (ship) in service with J Campbell Ltd, Irvine, 1947-54
- Annick Bonzon (born 1971), Swiss alpine skier
- Annick Horiuchi, French historian of mathematics
- Annick Lambrecht (born 1969), Belgian politician
- Annick Le Thomas (1936–2024), French botanist
- Annick Loiseau (born 1957), French physicist
- Annick Masselot, professor of law in New Zealand
- Annick Petrus (born 1961), French Saint Martinois politician
- Annick Press, a Canadian publisher

== See also ==
- Annick Water, tributary of the River Irvine, Ayrshire, Scotland
- Annick ward, local authority area of Scotland, covering Stewarton
- Annick Lodge and Greenville, a country estate in North Ayrshire, Scotland
