= Loiseau =

Loiseau is a French surname, most prevalent in Loiret. Notable people with the surname include:

- Gustave Loiseau (1865–1935), French painter
- Carlos Loiseau (1948–2012), Argentine cartoonist
- Dominique Loiseau (1949–2013), French and Swiss watchmaker
- Bernard Loiseau (1951–2003), French chef
- Annick Loiseau (born 1957), French physicist
- Philippe Loiseau (born 1957), French politician
- Patrick Loiseau (born 1960), French politician
- Nathalie Loiseau (born 1964), French diplomat and academic administrator
- Hervé Djamel Loiseau (born 1973), French soldier
- David Loiseau (born 1979), Haitian-Canadian mixed martial arts fighter
- Shawn Loiseau (born 1989), American footballer
