= Fort des Ayvelles =

- Part of Séré de Rivières system
- France
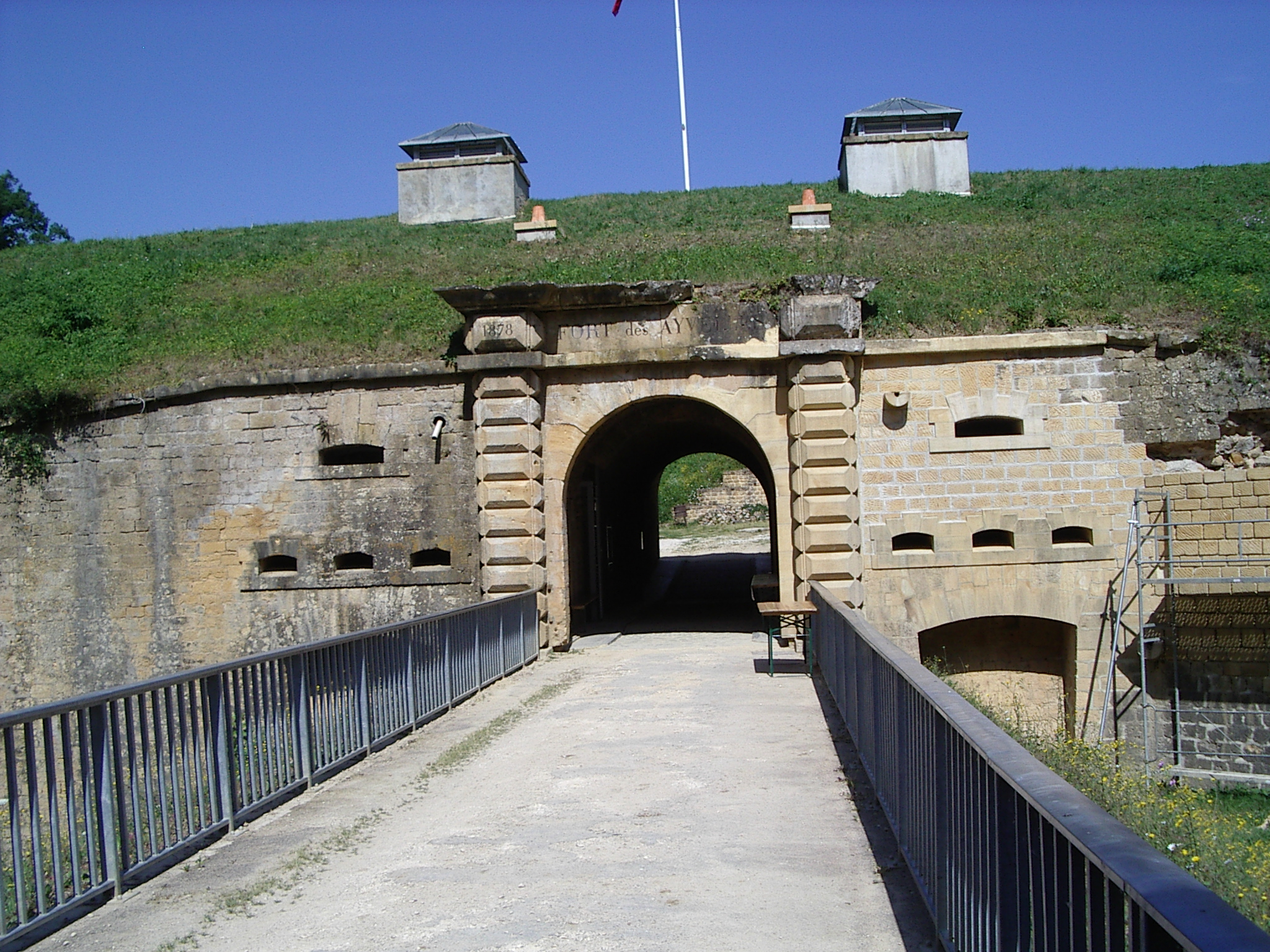

Site information
- Type: Fort
- Controlled by: France
- Open to the public: Yes
- Condition: Preserved

Location
- Location within France
- Coordinates: 49.72667°N 4.7375°E

Site history
- Built: 1876
- Materials: Brick, stone
- Battles/wars: Battle of the Meuse, Battle of France

The Fort des Ayvelles, also known as the Fort Dubois-Crancé, is a fortification near the French communes of Villers-Semeuse and Les Ayvelles in the Ardennes, just to the south of Charleville-Mézières. As part of the Séré de Rivières system of fortifications, the fort was planned as part of a new ring of forts replacing the older citadel of Mézières with dispersed fortifications. With advances in the range and destructive power of artillery, the city's defensive perimeter had to be pushed away from the city center to the limits of artillery range. The Fort des Ayvelles was the only such fortification to be completed of the ensemble, as resources were diverted elsewhere. At the time of its construction the fort controlled the Meuse and the railway line linking Reims, Montmédy, Givet and Hirson. The Fort des Ayvelles was reduced in status in 1899, its masonry construction rendered obsolete by the advent of high-explosive artillery shells. However, it was re-manned for the First World War before it was captured by the Germans on 29 August 1914. The fort was partly destroyed in 1918. During the Battle of France in 1940 the fort was bombarded. French resisters were executed at Ayvelles during both world wars. At present the fort is maintained by a preservation society, and may be visited.

== Description ==
Built starting in 1876 under the direction of Captain Léon Boulenger, the fort was completed in 1878. The fort's four 250-metre (820 ft) faces form a square perimeter, surrounded by a ditch 10 metres (33 ft) wide and 8 metres (26 ft) deep. The fort features particularly elaborate double caponiers to protect the outer wall and ditch on opposite corners, as well as 7-metre (23 ft) counterscarps. The caponiers were provided with unique projecting watch-stations, or échauguettes. The fort and a subsidiary battery featured Mougin casemates, each armed with a single de Bange Model 1877 155 mm gun. The fort possessed 53 artillery pieces in 1899, manned by 880 men, and disposed in two-level casemates on a north-south line. The battery is about 600 metres (2,000 ft) to the east, connected to the main fort by a covered causeway. The caponiers were damaged by both world wars and by the French military in explosives tests in 1960 in preparation for demolition of the urban fortifications of Charleville Mézières. The Mougin gun was removed at about this time, but the casemate remains.

In addition to its own Mougin casemate, the pentagonal detached battery was armed with 10 artillery pieces, served by 150 men. The battery was provided with a wall and ditch, with caponiers and counterscarps for defense. The battery was built in 1878 and was never modernized. The battery's Mougin casemate was entirely demolished after World War II by the French Army.

== 1914 ==
In 1914 the fort was manned by personnel of the French Fourth Army, under the overall command of General Fernand de Langle de Cary. The fort had been hastily garrisoned after the defeat of French forces in Belgium with two companies of the 45th Territorial Infantry Regiment and 300 territorial artillerymen, under the command of Commandant Georges Lévi Alvarès. These were reserve formations, largely composed of local residents. As French forces retreated and maneuvered in the face of the German attack, the fort was the only French force holding almost 11 kilometres (6.8 mi) of the front between Rimogne and Flize. Under these circumstances, Georges Lévi Alvarès requested permission from the Fourth Army to evacuate the fort in the event of German attack. However, before receiving a reply, he decided to evacuate after sabotaging the fort's arms. The garrison evacuated on August 25. Arriving at Boulzicourt, the troops were ordered back to the fort. At the same time, the Germans were preparing a bombardment of the fort. When the garrison returned to the fort on the 26th, the Germans opened fire. The French column retreated. Reaching Launois, the troops were sequestered. Georges Lévi Alvarès, who had remained at the Fort des Ayvelles, committed suicide on the 27th. His body was found by the Germans and was buried nearby, with honors. German forces had bombarded the fort on the 26th and 27th, and waited until the 29th to enter the fort. They stripped the fort of its remaining metals for scrap.

While they occupied the area Germans used the Fort des Ayvelles as a munitions depot and as a prison. The fort was the execution site for three French civilians, executed by the Germans between October 1915 and January 1916. The fort was reoccupied by France at the close of the war in November 1918.

== 1940 ==
In 1940 the Fort des Ayvelles was manned by the second battalion of the French 148th Fortress Infantry Regiment under the command of Commandant Marie, which was in turn part of the weak 102nd Fortress Infantry Division. The 102nd DIF was the successor organization to the Defensive Sector of the Ardennes, which had administered a weak section of the Maginot Line fortifications. The sector was composed principally of scattered casemates and blockhouses, as the French command regarded the Ardennes sector as unsuitable for mechanized warfare. On 14 May 1940 the fort was bombarded by German forces, while the first and third battalions of the 148th RIF faced direct German attack. During the night of 15 May the fort was abandoned by French forces. The remaining troops of the 148th RIF nonetheless found themselves encircled and surrendered.

Once again, the fort was the scene of civilian executions, with thirteen members of the French Resistance executed there. The most notable victims were les quatres cheminots d'Amagne ("the four railway workers of Amagne"), René Arnould, Georges Boillot, Robert Stadler and Lucien Maisonneuve, executed on 26 June 1944 for sabotage at the Amagne-Lucqy depot.

== Blockhouses ==
Two blockhouses are near the fort, constructed in the 1930s as part of the Defensive Sector of the Ardennes: the Blockhaus du Fort des Ayvelles Sud, and the Blockhaus de Villers-Semeuse. Both were lightly armed.

== Present status ==
The fort is maintained by the Association du Fort et de la Batterie des Ayvelles, and may be visited.
