= Launois =

Launois is a French surname. Notable people with the name include:

- Bernard Launois (1930–2026), French exploitation film director, screenwriter and actor
- Jean Launois (1898–1942), French artist
- John Launois (1928–2002), French-American photojournalist
- Pascale Launois, French crystallographer
- Pierre-Émile Launois (1856–1914), French physician

== See also ==
- Launois-sur-Vence, commune in the Ardennes department in northern France
- Launois-Cleret syndrome and benign symmetric lipomatosis of Launois–Bensaude, named after Pierre-Émile Launois
