= Crystal =

Solid material with highly ordered microscopic structure

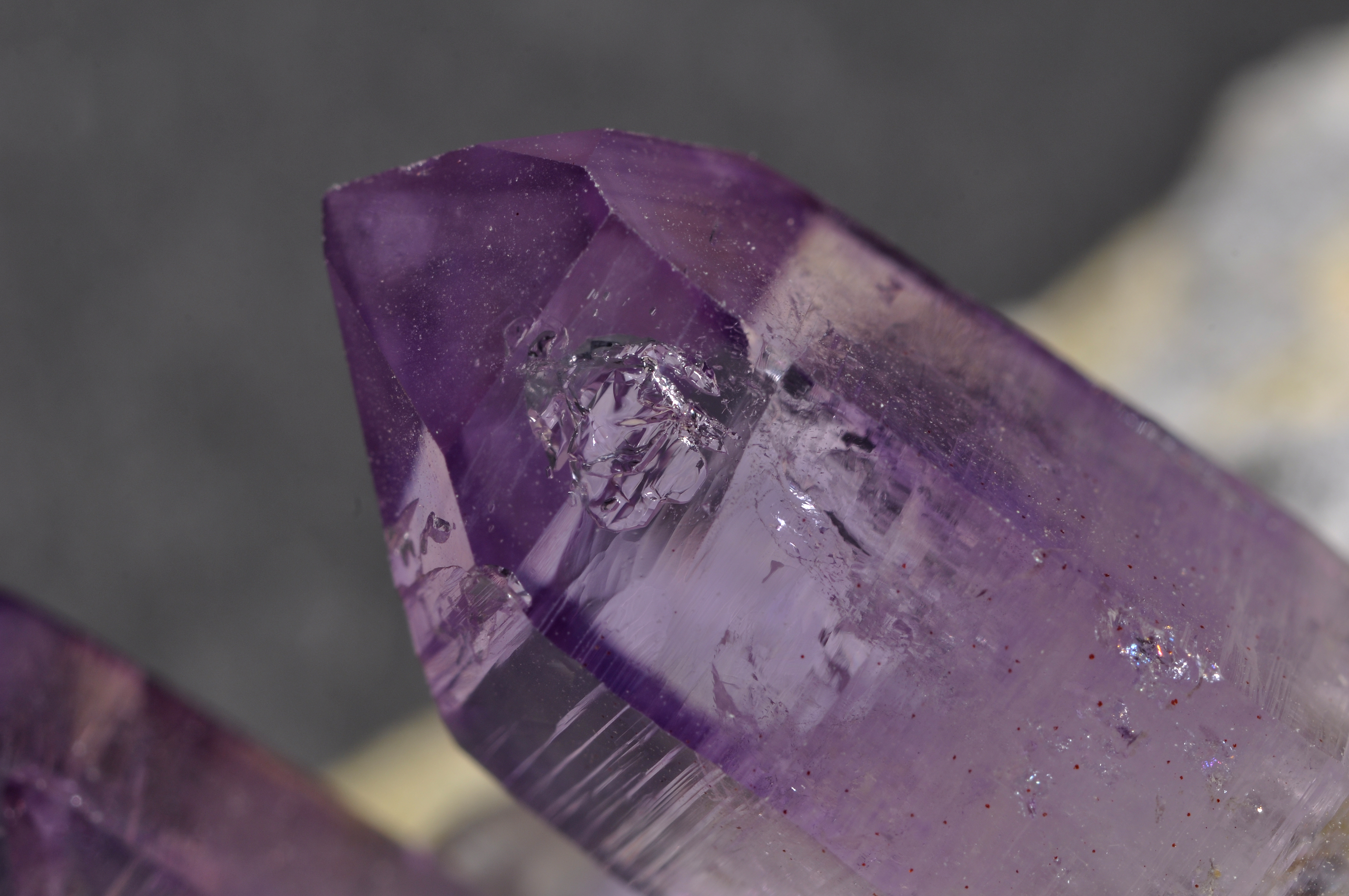
Crystals of amethyst quartz

Microscopically, a single crystal has atoms in a near-perfect periodic arrangement; a polycrystal is composed of many microscopic crystals (called "crystallites" or "grains"); and an amorphous solid (such as glass) has no periodic arrangement even microscopically.

A crystal or crystalline solid is a solid material whose constituents (such as atoms, molecules, or ions) are arranged in a highly ordered microscopic structure, forming a crystal lattice that extends in all directions. In addition, macroscopic single crystals are usually identifiable by their geometrical shape, consisting of flat faces with specific, characteristic orientations. The scientific study of crystals and crystal formation is known as crystallography. The process of crystal formation via mechanisms of crystal growth is called crystallization or solidification.

The word crystal derives from the Ancient Greek word κρύσταλλος (krustallos), meaning both "ice" and "rock crystal", from κρύος (kruos), "icy cold, frost".

Examples of large crystals include snowflakes, diamonds, and table salt. Most inorganic solids are not crystals but polycrystals, i.e. many microscopic crystals fused together into a single solid. Polycrystals include most metals, rocks, ceramics, and ice. A third category of solids is amorphous solids, where the atoms have no periodic structure whatsoever. Examples of amorphous solids include glass, wax, and many plastics.

Despite the name, lead crystal, crystal glass, and related products are not crystals, but rather types of glass, i.e. amorphous solids.

Crystals, or crystalline solids, are often used in pseudoscientific practices such as crystal therapy, and, along with gemstones, are sometimes associated with spellwork in Wiccan beliefs and related religious movements.

== Crystal structure (microscopic) ==
Halite (table salt, NaCl): Microscopic and macroscopic

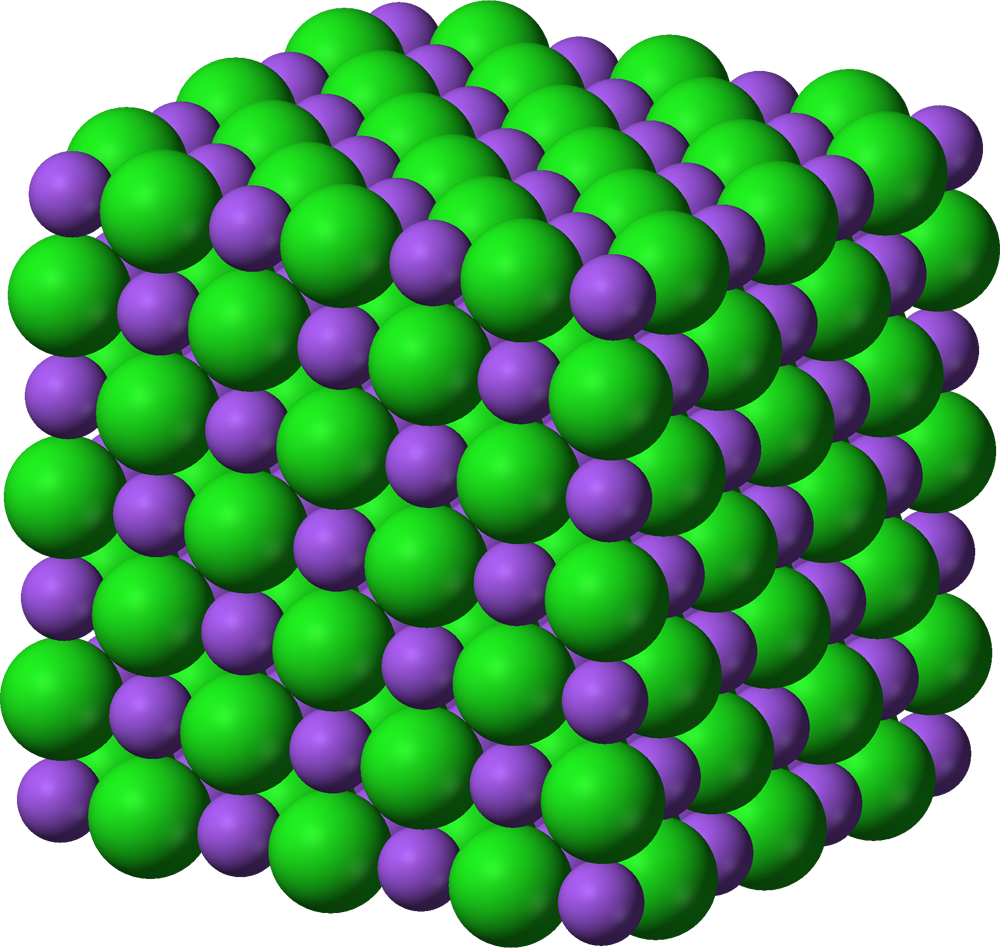
Microscopic structure of a halite crystal. (Purple is sodium ion, green is chlorine ion). There is cubic symmetry in the atoms' arrangement

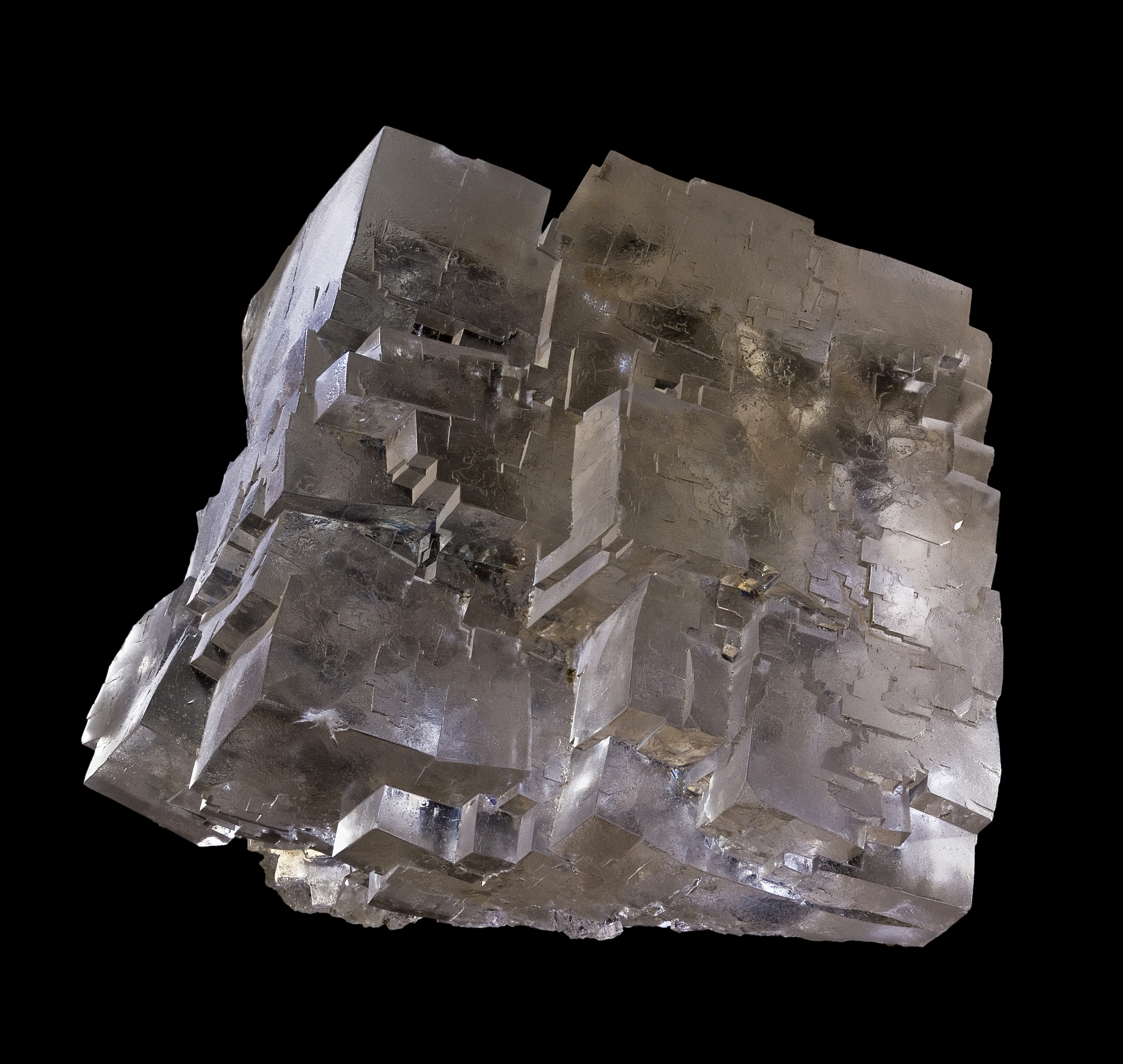
Macroscopic (~16 cm) halite crystal. The right-angles between crystal faces are due to the cubic symmetry of the atoms' arrangement

The scientific definition of a "crystal" is based on the microscopic arrangement of atoms inside it, called the crystal structure. A crystal is a solid where the atoms form a periodic arrangement. (Quasicrystals are an exception, see below).

Not all solids are crystals. For example, when liquid water starts freezing, the phase change begins with small ice crystals that grow until they fuse, forming a polycrystalline structure. In the final block of ice, each of the small crystals (called "crystallites" or "grains") is a true crystal with a periodic arrangement of atoms, but the whole polycrystal does not have a periodic arrangement of atoms, because the periodic pattern is broken at the grain boundaries. Most macroscopic inorganic solids are polycrystalline, including almost all metals, ceramics, ice, rocks, etc. Solids that are neither crystalline nor polycrystalline, such as glass, are called amorphous solids, also called glassy, vitreous, or noncrystalline. These have no periodic order, even microscopically. There are distinct differences between crystalline solids and amorphous solids: most notably, the process of forming a glass does not release the latent heat of fusion, but forming a crystal does.

A crystal structure (an arrangement of atoms in a crystal) is characterized by its unit cell, a small imaginary box containing one or more atoms in a specific spatial arrangement. The unit cells are stacked in three-dimensional space to form the crystal.

The symmetry of a crystal is constrained by the requirement that the unit cells stack perfectly with no gaps. There are 219 possible crystal symmetries (230 is commonly cited, but this treats chiral equivalents as separate entities), called crystallographic space groups. These are grouped into 7 crystal systems, such as cubic crystal system (where the crystals may form cubes or rectangular boxes, such as halite shown at right) or hexagonal crystal system (where the crystals may form hexagons, such as ordinary water ice).

== Crystal faces, shapes and crystallographic forms ==
As a halite crystal is growing, new atoms can very easily attach to the parts of the surface with rough atomic-scale structure and many dangling bonds. Therefore, these parts of the crystal grow out very quickly (yellow arrows). Eventually, the whole surface consists of smooth, stable faces, where new atoms cannot as easily attach themselves.

Crystals are commonly recognized, macroscopically, by their shape, consisting of flat faces with sharp angles. These shape characteristics are not necessary for a crystal—a crystal is scientifically defined by its microscopic atomic arrangement, not its macroscopic shape—but the characteristic macroscopic shape is often present and easy to see.

Euhedral crystals are those that have obvious, well-formed flat faces. Anhedral crystals do not, usually because the crystal is one grain in a polycrystalline solid.

The flat faces (also called facets) of a euhedral crystal are oriented in a specific way relative to the underlying atomic arrangement of the crystal: they are planes of relatively low Miller index. This occurs because some surface orientations are more stable than others (lower surface energy). As a crystal grows, new atoms attach easily to the rougher and less stable parts of the surface, but less easily to the flat, stable surfaces. Therefore, the flat surfaces tend to grow larger and smoother, until the whole crystal surface consists of these plane surfaces. (See diagram on right.)

One of the oldest techniques in the science of crystallography consists of measuring the three-dimensional orientations of the faces of a crystal, and using them to infer the underlying crystal symmetry.

A crystal's crystallographic forms are sets of possible faces of the crystal that are related by one of the symmetries of the crystal. For example, crystals of galena often take the shape of cubes, and the six faces of the cube belong to a crystallographic form that displays one of the symmetries of the isometric crystal system. Galena also sometimes crystallizes as octahedrons, and the eight faces of the octahedron belong to another crystallographic form reflecting a different symmetry of the isometric system. A crystallographic form is described by placing the Miller indices of one of its faces within brackets. For example, the octahedral form is written as {111}, and the other faces in the form are implied by the symmetry of the crystal.

Forms may be closed, meaning that the form can completely enclose a volume of space, or open, meaning that it cannot. The cubic and octahedral forms are examples of closed forms. All the forms of the isometric system are closed, while all the forms of the monoclinic and triclinic crystal systems are open. A crystal's faces may all belong to the same closed form, or they may be a combination of multiple open or closed forms.

A crystal's habit is its visible external shape. This is determined by the crystal structure (which restricts the possible facet orientations), the specific crystal chemistry and bonding (which may favor some facet types over others), and the conditions under which the crystal formed.

== Occurrence in nature ==
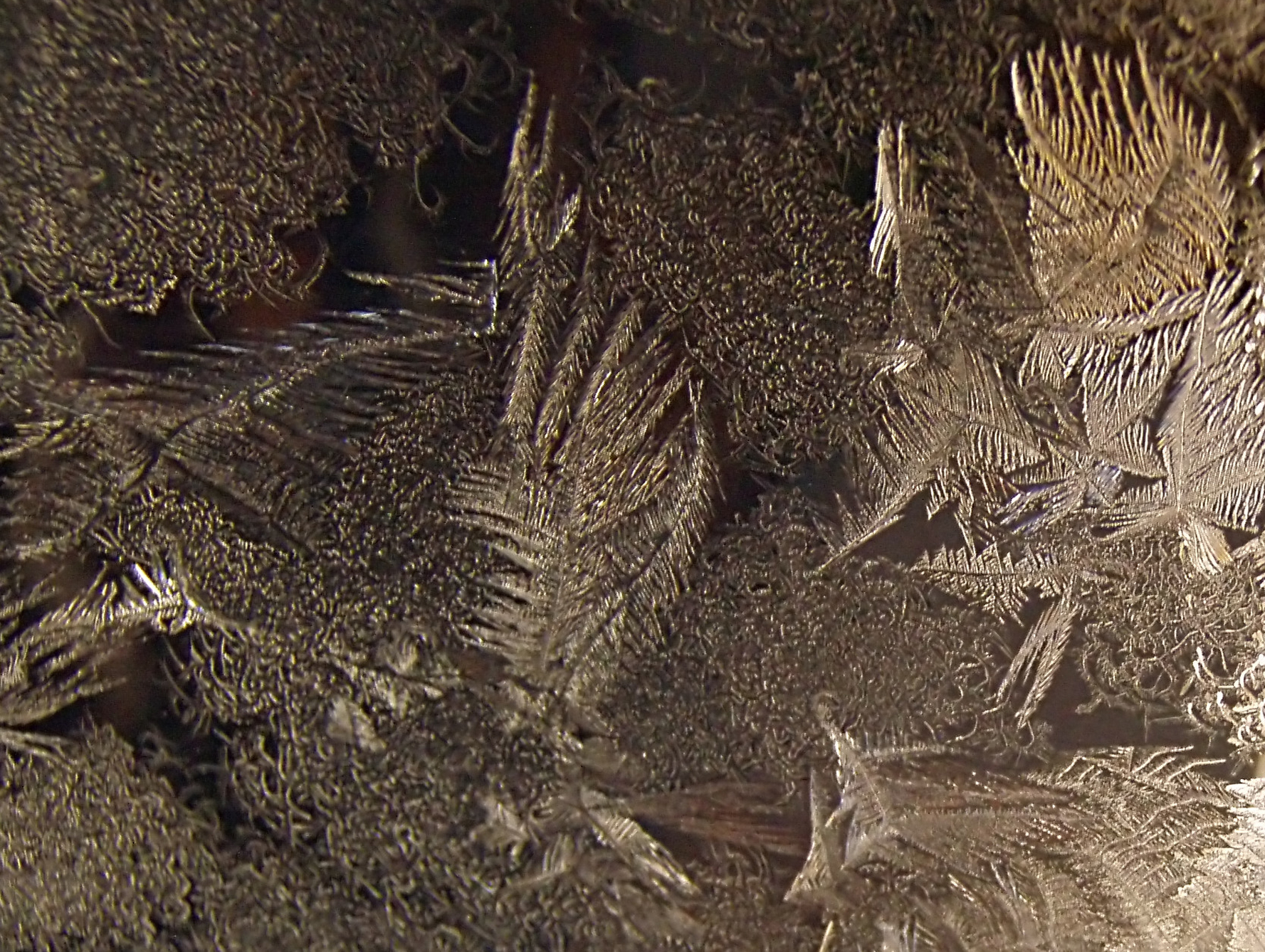
Ice crystals

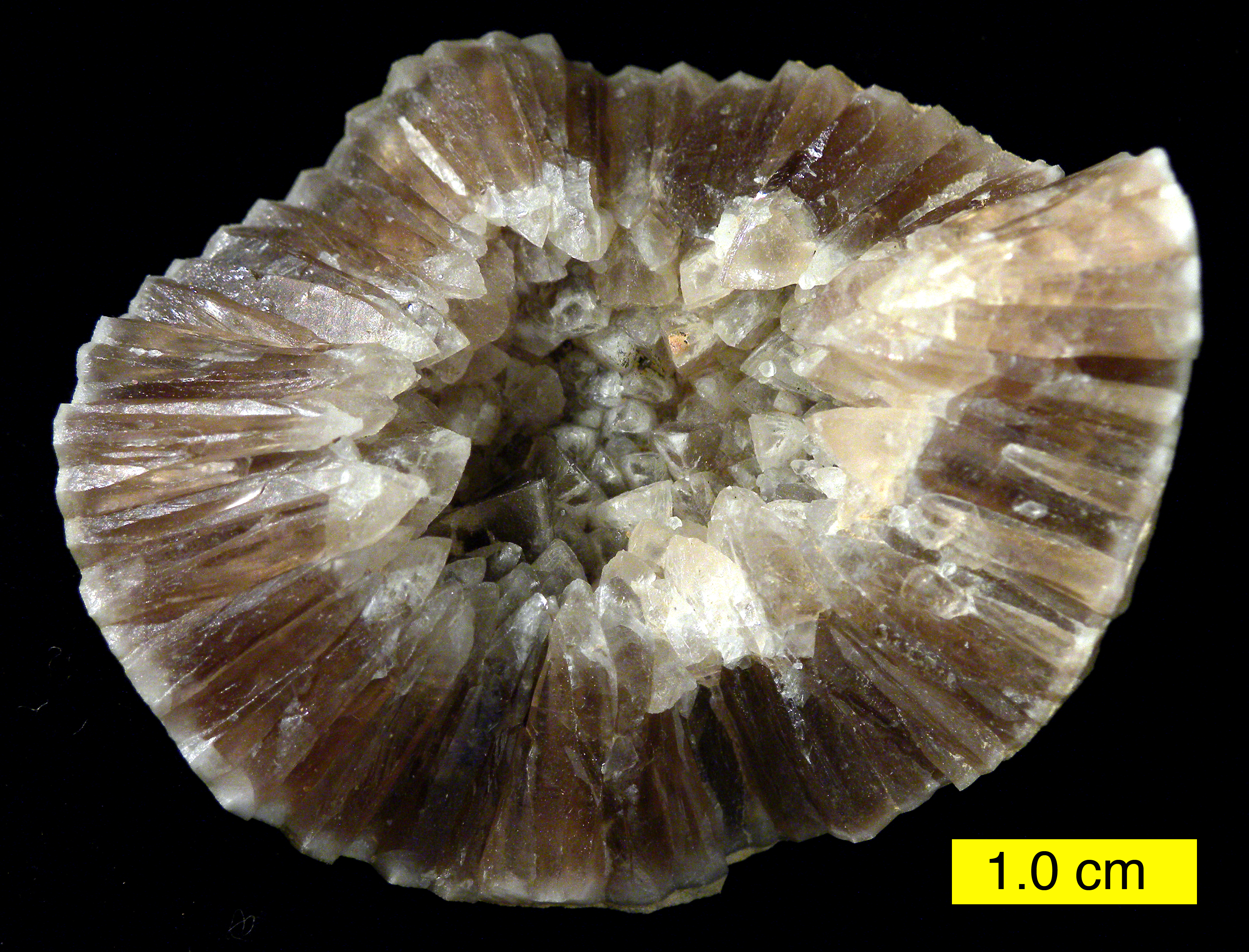
Fossil shell with calcite crystals

=== Rocks ===
By volume and weight, the largest concentrations of crystals in the Earth are part of its solid bedrock. Crystals found in rocks typically range in size from a fraction of a millimetre to several centimetres across, although exceptionally large crystals are occasionally found. As of 1999, the world's largest known naturally occurring crystal is a crystal of beryl from Malakialina, Madagascar, 18 m (59 ft) long and 3.5 m (11 ft) in diameter, and weighing 380,000 kg (840,000 lb).

Some crystals have formed by magmatic and metamorphic processes, giving origin to large masses of crystalline rock. The vast majority of igneous rocks are formed from molten magma and the degree of crystallization depends primarily on the conditions under which they solidified. Rocks such as granite undergo a gradual reduction in temperature under high pressure and thus completely crystallize. On the other hand, many kinds of lava pour out at the surface and subsequently undergo rapid cooling; in this group a small amount of amorphous or glassy matter is commonly found. Other crystalline rocks, the metamorphic rocks such as marbles, mica-schists and quartzites, are recrystallized. This means that they were at first fragmental rocks like limestone, shale and sandstone and have never been in a molten condition nor entirely in solution, but the high temperature and pressure conditions of metamorphism have acted on them by erasing their original structures and inducing recrystallization in the solid state.

Other rock crystals have formed out of precipitation from fluids, commonly water, to form druses or quartz veins. Evaporites such as halite, gypsum and some limestones have been deposited from aqueous solution, mostly owing to evaporation in arid climates.

=== Ice ===
Water-based ice in the form of snow, sea ice, and glaciers are common crystalline/polycrystalline structures on Earth and other planets. A single snowflake is a single crystal or a collection of crystals, while an ice cube is a polycrystal. Ice crystals may form from cooling liquid water below its freezing point, such as ice cubes or a frozen lake. Frost, snowflakes, or small ice crystals suspended in the air (ice fog) more often grow from a supersaturated gaseous-solution of water vapor and air, when the temperature of the air drops below its dew point, without passing through a liquid state. Another unusual property of water is that it expands rather than contracts when it crystallizes.

=== Organigenic crystals ===
Many living organisms are able to produce crystals grown from an aqueous solution, for example calcite and aragonite in the case of most molluscs or hydroxylapatite in the case of bones and teeth in vertebrates.

== Polymorphism and allotropy ==
The same group of atoms can often solidify in many different ways. Polymorphism is the ability of a solid to exist in more than one crystal form. For example, water ice is ordinarily found in the hexagonal form Ice I_{h}, but can also exist as the cubic Ice I_{c}, the rhombohedral ice II, and many other forms. The different polymorphs are usually called different phases.

In addition, the same atoms may be able to form noncrystalline phases. For example, water can also form amorphous ice, while SiO_{2} can form both fused silica (an amorphous glass) and quartz (a crystal). Likewise, if a substance can form crystals, it can also form polycrystals.

For pure chemical elements, polymorphism is referred to as allotropy. For example, diamond and graphite are two crystalline forms of carbon, while amorphous carbon is a noncrystalline form. Polymorphs, despite having the same atoms, may have very different properties. For example, diamond is the hardest substance known, while graphite is so soft that it is used as a lubricant. Chocolate can form six different types of crystals, but only one has the suitable hardness and melting point for candy bars and confections. Polymorphism in steel is responsible for its ability to be heat treated, giving it a wide range of properties.

Polyamorphism is a similar phenomenon where the same atoms can exist in more than one amorphous solid form.

== Crystallization ==
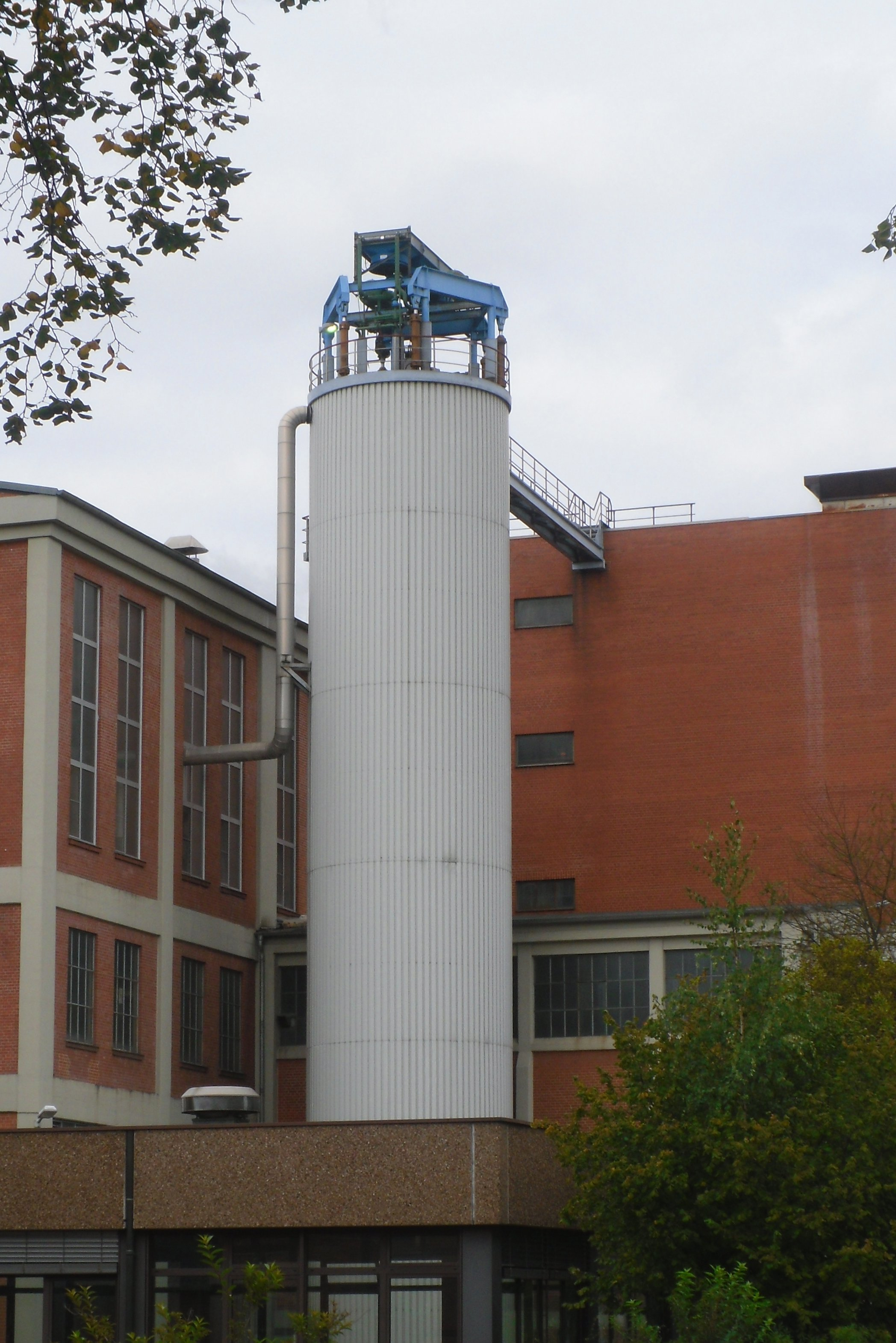
Vertical cooling crystallizer in a beet sugar factory.

Crystallization is the process of forming a crystalline structure from a fluid or from materials dissolved in a fluid. (More rarely, crystals may be deposited directly from gas; see: epitaxy and frost.)

Crystallization is a complex and extensively-studied field, because depending on the conditions, a single fluid can solidify into many different possible forms. It can form a single crystal, perhaps with various possible phases, stoichiometries, impurities, defects, and habits. Or, it can form a polycrystal, with various possibilities for the size, arrangement, orientation, and phase of its grains. The final form of the solid is determined by the conditions under which the fluid is being solidified, such as the chemistry of the fluid, the ambient pressure, the temperature, and the speed with which all these parameters are changing.

Specific industrial techniques to produce large single crystals (called boules) include the Czochralski process and the Bridgman technique. Other less exotic methods of crystallization may be used, depending on the physical properties of the substance, including hydrothermal synthesis, sublimation, or simply solvent-based crystallization.

Large single crystals can be created by geological processes. For example, selenite crystals in excess of 10 m are found in the Cave of the Crystals in Naica, Mexico. For more details on geological crystal formation, see above.

Crystals can also be formed by biological processes, see above. Conversely, some organisms have special techniques to prevent crystallization from occurring, such as antifreeze proteins.

== Defects, impurities, and twinning ==
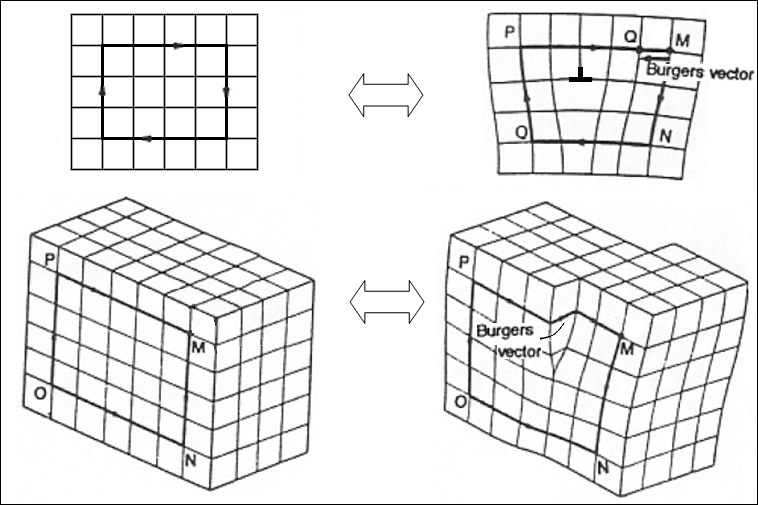
Two types of crystallographic defects. Top right: edge dislocation. Bottom right: screw dislocation.

An ideal crystal has every atom in a perfect, exactly repeating pattern. However, in reality, most crystalline materials have a variety of crystallographic defects: places where the crystal's pattern is interrupted. The types and structures of these defects may have a profound effect on the properties of the materials.

A few examples of crystallographic defects include vacancy defects (an empty space where an atom should fit), interstitial defects (an extra atom squeezed in where it does not fit), and dislocations (see figure at right). Dislocations are especially important in materials science, because they help determine the mechanical strength of materials.

Another common type of crystallographic defect is an impurity, meaning that the "wrong" type of atom is present in a crystal. For example, a perfect crystal of diamond would only contain carbon atoms, but a real crystal might perhaps contain a few boron atoms as well. These boron impurities change the diamond's color to slightly blue. Likewise, the only difference between ruby and sapphire is the type of impurities present in a corundum crystal.

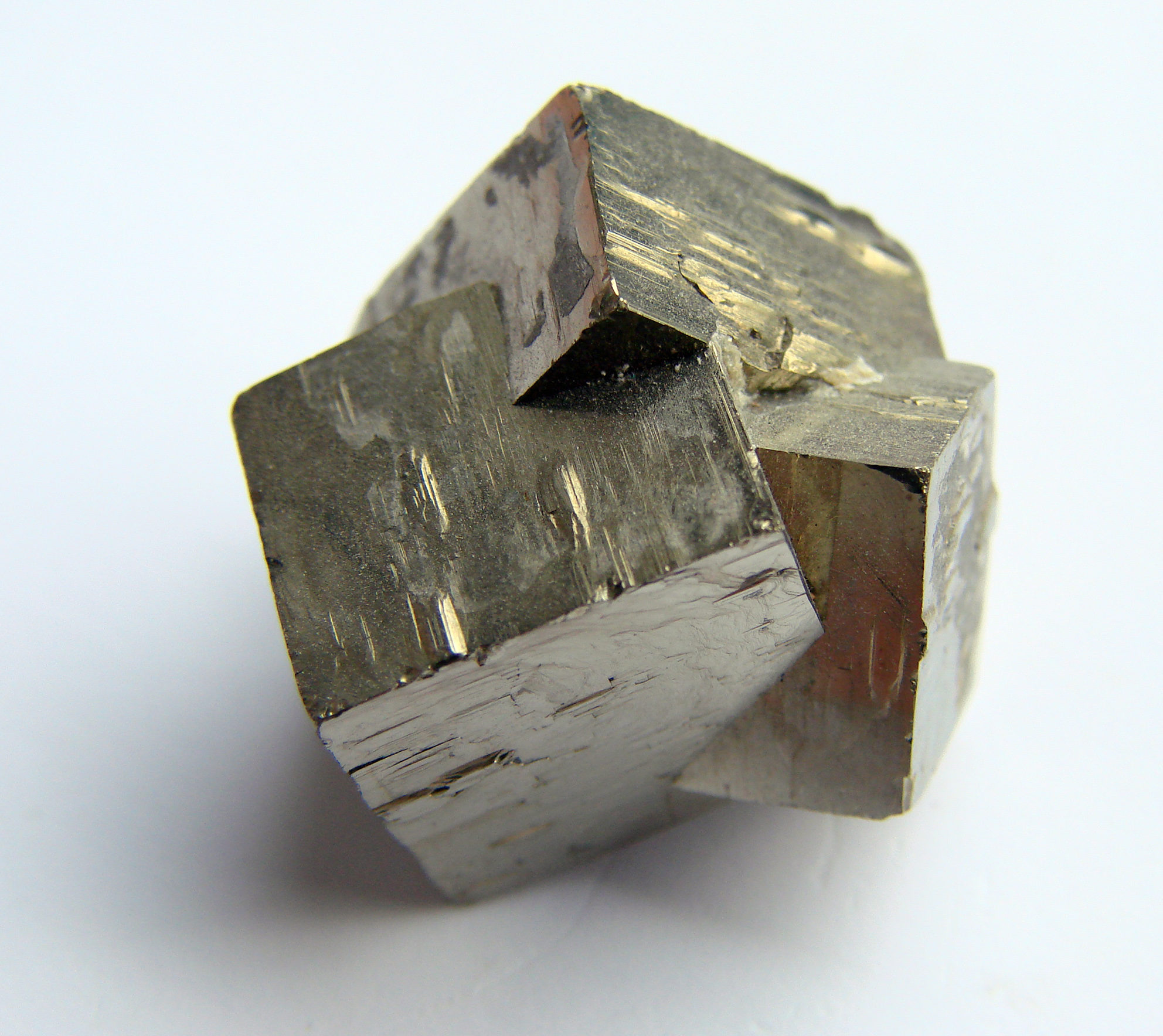
Twinned pyrite crystal group.

In semiconductors, a special type of impurity, called a dopant, drastically changes the crystal's electrical properties. Semiconductor devices, such as transistors, are made possible largely by putting different semiconductor dopants into different places, in specific patterns.

Twinning is a phenomenon somewhere between a crystallographic defect and a grain boundary. Like a grain boundary, a twin boundary has different crystal orientations on its two sides. But unlike a grain boundary, the orientations are not random, but related in a specific, mirror-image way.

Mosaicity is a spread of crystal plane orientations. A mosaic crystal consists of smaller crystalline units that are somewhat misaligned with respect to each other.

== Chemical bonds ==
In general, solids can be held together by various types of chemical bonds, such as metallic bonds, ionic bonds, covalent bonds, van der Waals bonds, and others. None of these are necessarily crystalline or non-crystalline. However, there are some general trends as follows:

Metals crystallize rapidly and are almost always polycrystalline, though there are exceptions like amorphous metal and single-crystal metals. The latter are grown synthetically, for example, fighter-jet turbines are typically made by first growing a single crystal of titanium alloy, increasing its strength and melting point over polycrystalline titanium. A small piece of metal may naturally form into a single crystal, such as Type 2 telluric iron, but larger pieces generally do not unless extremely slow cooling occurs. For example, iron meteorites are often composed of single crystal, or many large crystals that may be several meters in size, due to very slow cooling in the vacuum of space. The slow cooling may allow the precipitation of a separate phase within the crystal lattice, which form at specific angles determined by the lattice, called Widmanstatten patterns.

Ionic compounds typically form when a metal reacts with a non-metal, such as sodium with chlorine. These often form substances called salts, such as sodium chloride (table salt) or potassium nitrate (saltpeter), with crystals that are often brittle and cleave relatively easily. Ionic materials are usually crystalline or polycrystalline. In practice, large salt crystals can be created by solidification of a molten fluid, or by crystallization out of a solution. Some ionic compounds can be very hard, such as oxides like aluminium oxide found in many gemstones such as ruby and synthetic sapphire.

Covalently bonded solids (sometimes called covalent network solids) are typically formed from one or more non-metals, such as carbon or silicon and oxygen, and are often very hard, rigid, and brittle. These are also very common, notable examples being diamond and quartz respectively.

Weak van der Waals forces also help hold together certain crystals, such as crystalline molecular solids, as well as the interlayer bonding in graphite. Substances such as fats, lipids and wax form molecular bonds because the large molecules do not pack as tightly as atomic bonds. This leads to crystals that are much softer and more easily pulled apart or broken. Common examples include chocolates, candles, or viruses. Water ice and dry ice are examples of other materials with molecular bonding.Polymer materials generally will form crystalline regions, but the lengths of the molecules usually prevent complete crystallization—and sometimes polymers are completely amorphous.

== Quasicrystals ==
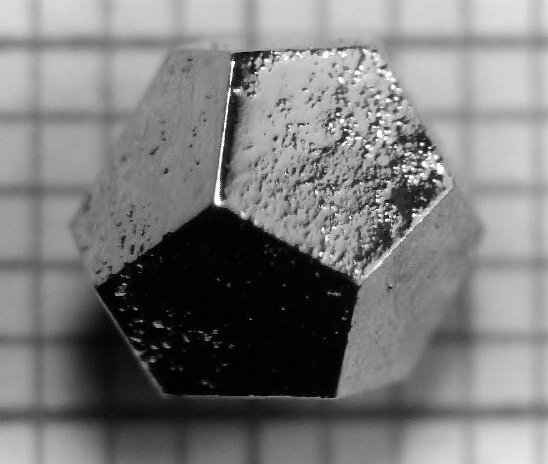
The material holmium–magnesium–zinc (Ho–Mg–Zn) forms quasicrystals, which can take on the macroscopic shape of a pentagonal dodecahedron. Only quasicrystals can take this 5-fold symmetry. The edges are 2 mm long.

A quasicrystal consists of arrays of atoms that are ordered but not strictly periodic. They have many attributes in common with ordinary crystals, such as displaying a discrete pattern in x-ray diffraction, and the ability to form shapes with smooth, flat faces.

Quasicrystals are most famous for their ability to show five-fold symmetry, which is impossible for an ordinary periodic crystal (see crystallographic restriction theorem).

The International Union of Crystallography has redefined the term "crystal" to include both ordinary periodic crystals and quasicrystals ("any solid having an essentially discrete diffraction diagram").

Quasicrystals, first discovered in 1982, are quite rare in practice. Only about 100 solids are known to form quasicrystals, compared to about 400,000 periodic crystals known in 2004. The 2011 Nobel Prize in Chemistry was awarded to Dan Shechtman for the discovery of quasicrystals.

== Special properties from anisotropy ==
Crystals can have certain special electrical, optical, and mechanical properties that glass and polycrystals normally cannot. These properties are related to the anisotropy of the crystal, i.e. the lack of rotational symmetry in its atomic arrangement. One such property is the piezoelectric effect, where a voltage across the crystal can shrink or stretch it. Another is birefringence, where a double image appears when looking through a crystal. Moreover, various properties of a crystal, including electrical conductivity, electrical permittivity, and Young's modulus, may be different in different directions in a crystal. For example, graphite crystals consist of a stack of sheets, and although each individual sheet is mechanically very strong, the sheets are rather loosely bound to each other. Therefore, the mechanical strength of the material is quite different depending on the direction of stress.

Not all crystals have all of these properties. Conversely, these properties are not quite exclusive to crystals. They can appear in glasses or polycrystals that have been made anisotropic by working or stress—for example, stress-induced birefringence.

== Crystallography ==
Crystallography is the science of measuring the crystal structure (in other words, the atomic arrangement) of a crystal. One widely used crystallography technique is X-ray diffraction. Large numbers of known crystal structures are stored in crystallographic databases.

== Image gallery ==
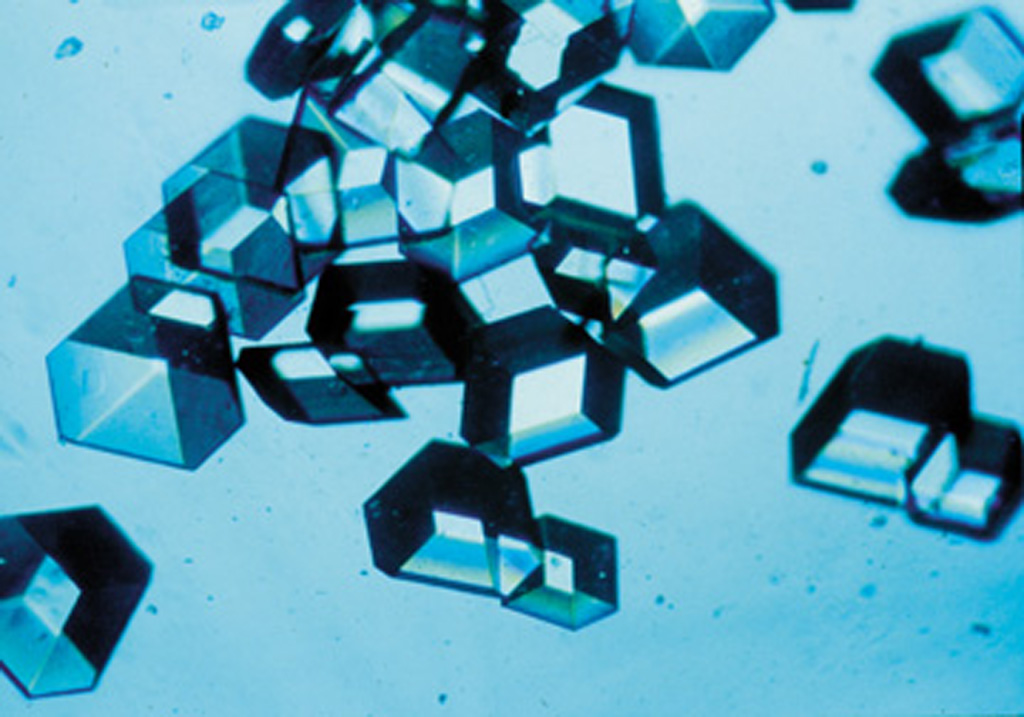
Insulin crystals grown in earth orbit. The low gravity allows crystals to be grown with minimal defects.

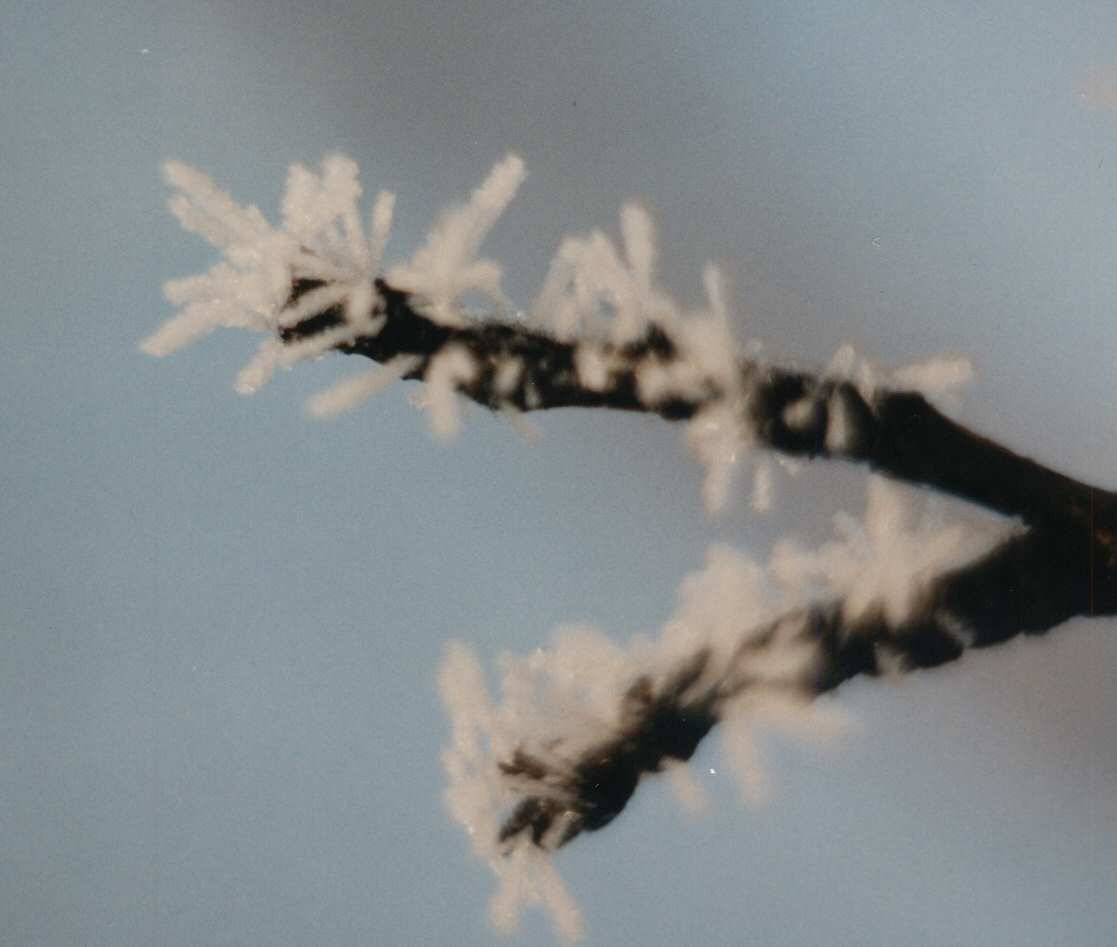
Hoar frost: A type of ice crystal (picture taken from a distance of about 5 cm).

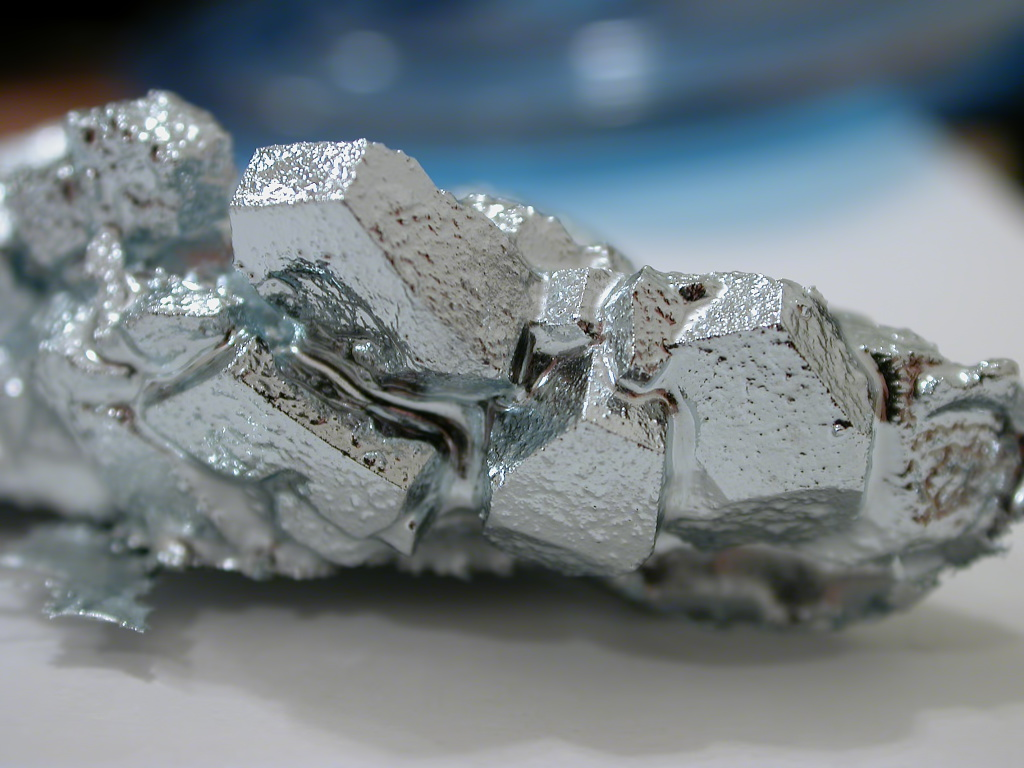
Gallium, a metal that easily forms large crystals.

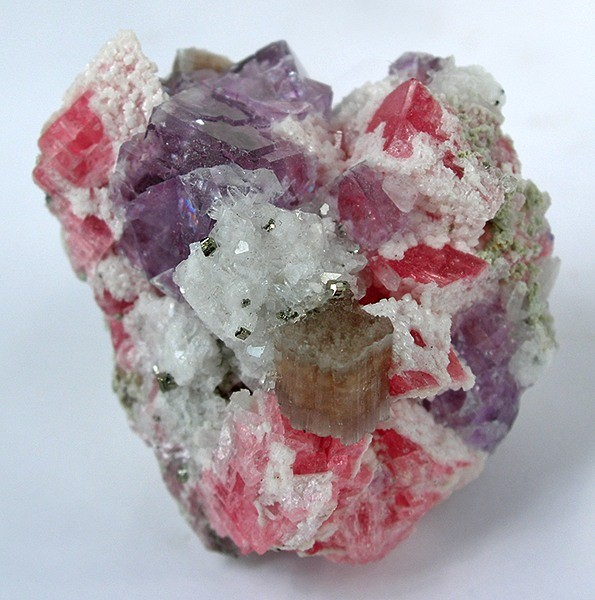
An apatite crystal sits front and center on cherry-red rhodochroite rhombs, purple fluorite cubes, quartz and a dusting of brass-yellow pyrite cubes.

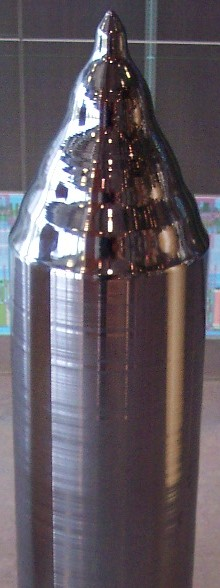
Boules of silicon, like this one, are an important type of industrially-produced single crystal.

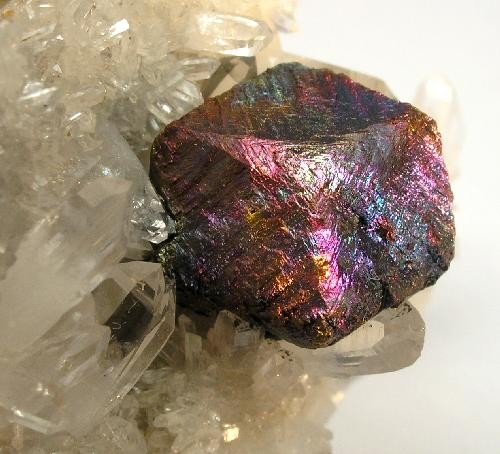
A specimen consisting of a bornite-coated chalcopyrite crystal nestled in a bed of clear quartz crystals and lustrous pyrite crystals. The bornite-coated crystal is up to 1.5 cm across.

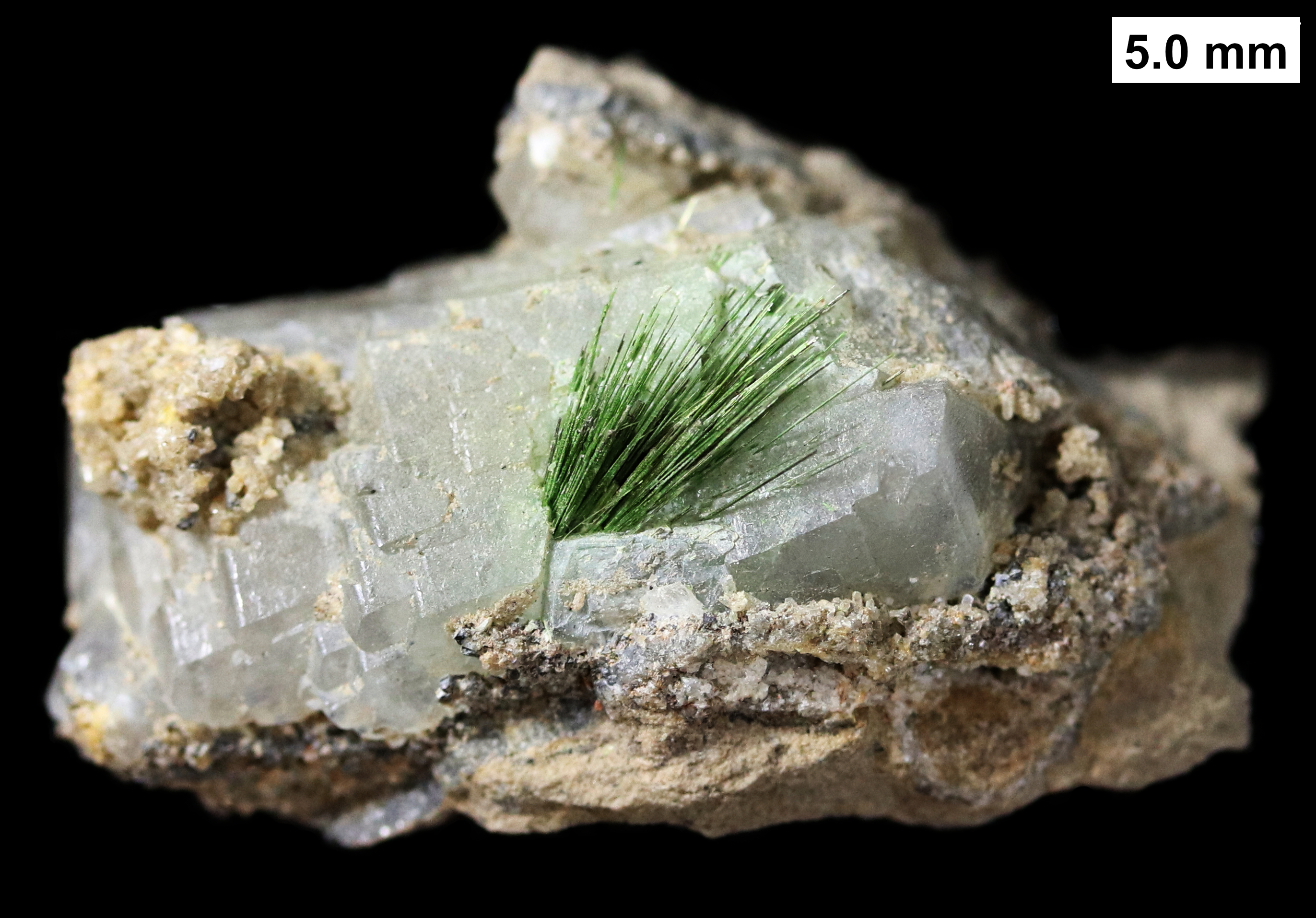
Needle-like millerite crystals partially encased in calcite crystal and oxidized on their surfaces to zaratite; from the Devonian Milwaukee Formation of Wisconsin

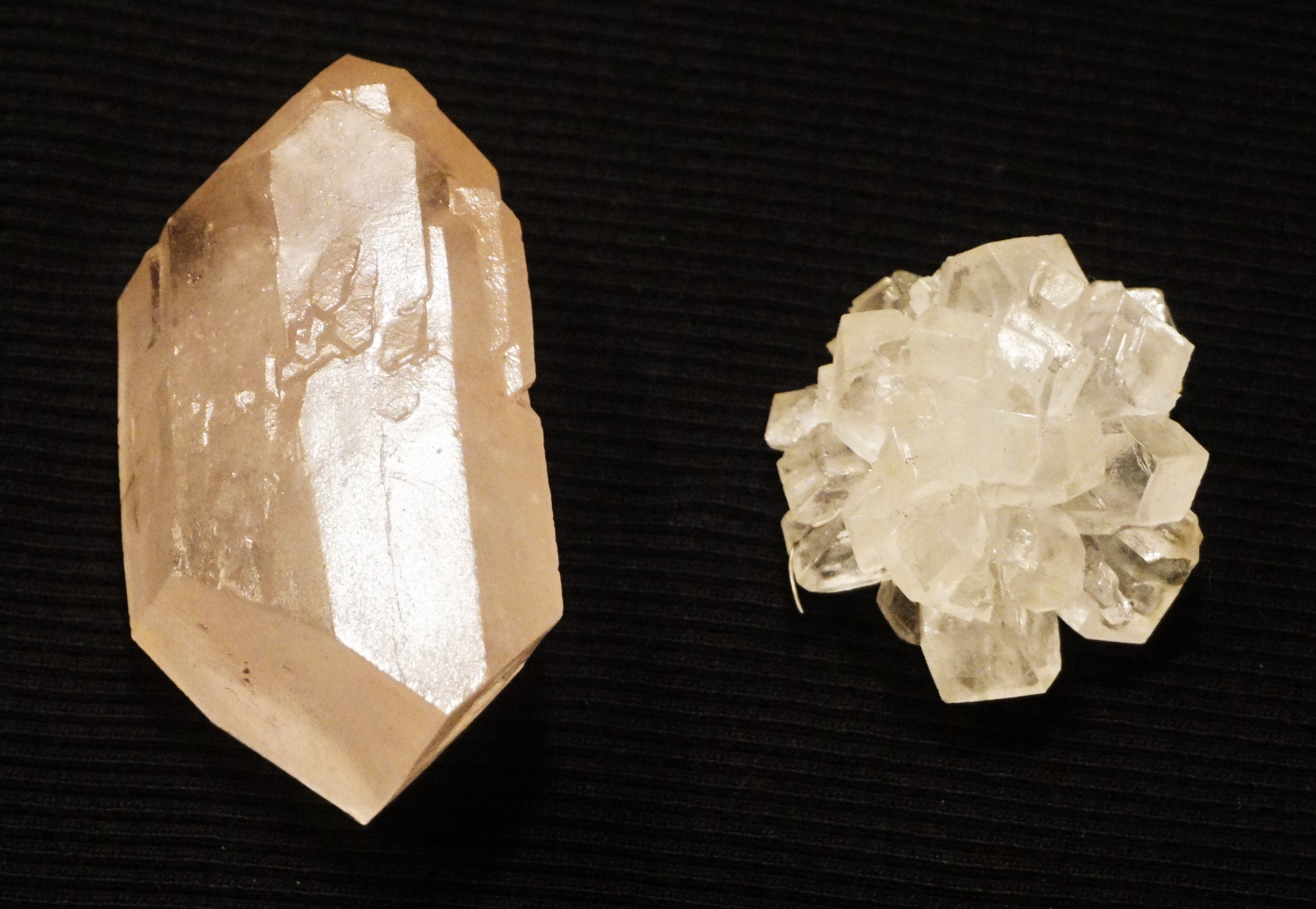
Crystallized sugar. Crystals on the right were grown from a sugar cube, while the left from a single seed crystal taken from the right. Red dye was added to the solution when growing the larger crystal, but, insoluble with the solid sugar, all but small traces were forced to precipitate out as it grew.

== See also ==
- Atomic packing factor
- Anticrystal
- Cocrystal
- Colloidal crystal
- Crystal growth
- Crystal oscillator
- Liquid crystal
- Time crystal
