= Europium(II) silicate =

Names
- Other names Europium orthosilicate

Identifiers
CAS Number	13537-14-9
ECHA InfoCard	100.133.539
EC Number	603-916-4

Properties
Chemical formula	Eu_{2}SiO_{4}
Molar mass	396.01 g/mol
Appearance	Lemon-yellow solid
Density	6.734 g/cm^{3}

Structure
Crystal structure	Monoclinic, larnite type
Space group	P2_{1}/n, No. 14
Lattice constant	a = 0.56502 nm, b = 0.70915 nm, c = 0.97584 nm α = 90°, β = 92.614°, γ = 90°
Formula units (Z)	4
- Except where otherwise noted, data are given for materials in their standard state (at 25 °C [77 °F], 100 kPa). Infobox references

Europium(II) silicate, also known as europium orthosilicate, is an inorganic compound of europium and silicon with the chemical formula Eu_{2}SiO_{4}. It is an orthosilicate containing isolated SiO_{4} tetrahedra and divalent europium ions. The compound is strongly luminescent and undergoes both structural and magnetic phase transitions.

== Structure and properties ==
At room temperature, europium(II) silicate crystallizes in the monoclinic crystal system with the larnite-type structure, isotypic with β-Ca_{2}SiO_{4}. It belongs to space group P2_{1}/n (No. 14), with lattice parameters a = 5.6502 Å, b = 7.0915 Å, c = 9.7584 Å and β = 92.614°, with four formula units per unit cell.

The structure contains isolated SiO^{4−}_{4} tetrahedra, so Eu_{2}SiO_{4} is a nesosilicate. Two crystallographically distinct Eu^{2+} sites occur in the structure.

At about 452 K (179 °C), Eu_{2}SiO_{4} undergoes a reversible transition to an incommensurately modulated high-temperature phase related to the orthorhombic Pnma structure. The transition is accompanied by pronounced changes in birefringence, dielectric properties and luminescence.

Earlier measurements placed the transition near 165 °C and showed that it is accompanied by changes in colour, optical band gap, luminescence intensity and dielectric constant.

Europium(II) silicate is strongly photoluminescent. At room temperature it emits bright yellow light, while the high-temperature phase shows a shift toward orange emission.

It is also ferromagnetic at very low temperature. Modern measurements report a ferromagnetic transition below approximately 7 K.

=== Oxidation ===
Europium(II) silicate is stable in air at moderate temperatures but oxidizes on stronger heating. Oxidation proceeds topotactically through intermediate europium silicate phases containing both Eu^{2+} and Eu^{3+}, and ultimately yields Eu_{2}SiO_{5} at high temperature.

Partial oxidation begins at intermediate temperatures with formation of metastable apatite-like phases; Eu_{2}SiO_{5} is observed after more extensive oxidation above about 1000 °C.

== Preparation ==
Europium(II) silicate can be prepared by reacting europium(III) oxide, elemental europium and silicon dioxide at high temperature:

2 Eu_{2}O_{3} + 2 Eu + 3 SiO_{2} → 3 Eu_{2}SiO_{4}

Lemon-yellow single crystals have been obtained by heating the reactants in evacuated silica ampoules at 1373 K for 48 hours, followed by controlled cooling.

It can also be synthesized from Eu_{2}O_{3} and SiO_{2} under a hydrogen reducing atmosphere.

== Applications ==
Europium(II) silicate has been studied as a luminescent material because of its intense yellow Eu^{2+} emission and its temperature-dependent optical properties.

In 2025, Eu_{2}SiO_{4} attracted interest as a low-temperature magnetocaloric material. A study reported a magnetic entropy change of 21.6 J·kg^{−1}·K^{−1} for a field change of 0–1 T near liquid helium temperature, together with relatively high thermal conductivity, suggesting possible use in cryogenic magnetic refrigeration.
