= Alan Lindsay Mackay =

British crystallographer (1926–2025)

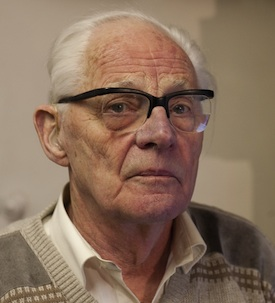
- Born: 6 September 1926; Wolverhampton, England
- Died: 24 February 2025 (aged 98)
- Education: Oundle School; University of Cambridge; Birkbeck College, University of London
- Known for: Quasicrystals, Mackay icosahedra, periodic minimal surfaces, generalised crystallography
- Awards: Buckley Prize
- Scientific career
- Fields: Crystallography
- Workplaces: Birkbeck College
- Doctoral advisor: John Desmond Bernal

Alan Lindsay Mackay FRS (6 September 1926 – 24 February 2025) was a British crystallographer.

== Life and career ==
Mackay was born in Wolverhampton on 6 September 1926. He was educated at Wolverhampton Grammar School, Oundle School, Trinity College, Cambridge, and the University of London, where he received his doctorate. He spent his scientific career at Birkbeck College, founded by George Birkbeck, one of the Colleges of the University of London, where he was immersed in a liberal scientific atmosphere under the leadership of John Desmond Bernal.

Mackay made important scientific contributions related to the structure of materials: In 1962 he published a manuscript that showed how to pack atoms in an icosahedral fashion; a first step towards five-fold symmetry in materials science. These arrangements are now called Mackay icosahedra. He is a pioneer in the introduction of five-fold symmetry in materials and in 1981 predicted quasicrystals in a paper (in Russian) entitled "De Nive Quinquangula" (a play on Kepler's De Nive Sexangula) in which he used a Penrose tiling in two and three dimensions to predict a new kind of ordered structures not allowed by traditional crystallography. In a later manuscript, in 1982, he took the optical Fourier transform of a 2-D Penrose tiling decorated with atoms, obtaining a pattern with sharp spots and five-fold symmetry. This brought the possibility of identifying quasiperiodic order in a material through diffraction. Quasicrystals with icosahedral symmetry were found by Dan Shechtman and co-workers in 1984.

For his contributions to quasicrystals in 2010 Mackay was awarded the Buckley Prize, of the American Physical Society, with Dov Levine and Paul Steinhardt. The Nobel Prize in Chemistry was awarded in 2011 to Dan Shechtman for the discovery of quasicrystals.

Mackay was interested in a generalised crystallography, which can describe not only crystals, but more complex structures and nanomaterials. He has applied his ideas of minimal surfaces to graphitic materials, proposing, with Humberto Terrones, periodic arrangements of carbon atoms with negative Gaussian curvature known as Schwarzites, which are the periodic cousins of Buckminsterfullerenes.

Mackay compiled a book of scientific quotations and has co-authored a book on geometry with Eric Lord and S. Ranganathan. He has also written a book of poetry and has translated from the German, with commentaries, Ernst Haeckel's last book "Kristallseelen", (1917). He produces scientifically inspired visual art under his artistic pseudonym Sho Takahashi.

Mackay became a Fellow of the Royal Society (FRS) on 17 March 1988 and a Fellow of Birkbeck College on 2 March 2002. He was also a Fellow of the Mexican Academy of Sciences.

Mackay died on 24 February 2025, at the age of 98.
