= Alnwick (surname) =

Alnwick is a surname. Notable people with the surname include:

- Ben Alnwick (born 1987), English footballer
- Jak Alnwick (born 1993), English footballer
- Robert Alnwick, English politician
- William Alnwick (died 1449), English Catholic clergyman
