= Peter Kramer (physicist) =

German physicist (1933–2026)

Peter Kramer (16 March 1933 – 23 April 2026) was a German physicist.

== Background ==
Kramer studied physics at the University of Münster, the University of Tübingen, the University of Bristol and the University of Marburg. He received his PhD in 1964 in Marburg and in 1968 his Habilitation in Tübingen. He was a postdoc at the UNAM in Mexico City, where he collaborated with Marcos Moshinsky. He was a professor at the Institute for Theoretical Physics in Tübingen from 1970 until 1998 when he retired. He has also served as a Dean and a Vice President at the University of Tübingen. Kramer married in 1962 and has two children.

Kramer died on 23 April 2026, at the age of 93.

== Scientific work ==
Kramer's work is concerned with applications of groups and representations in mathematical physics. His early work was in nuclear physics. In the early eighties he and his student Roberto Neri developed a mathematical model for quasiperiodic tesselations of three-dimensional space. Their paper was submitted in 1983 and published in 1984, a few months before Dan Shechtman and his co-workers announced the experimental discovery of an alloy with icosahedral quasi-crystalline structure. Shechtman was awarded the 2011 Nobel Prize in Chemistry for his work.

In later years, Kramer became interested in cosmology and three-dimensional space forms. His scientific œuvre contains more than 200 publications.

== Publications ==
- P. Kramer, G. John and D. Schenzle: Group Theory and the Interaction of Composite Nucleon Systems. Vieweg, Braunschweig 1981
- P. Kramer and M. Saraceno: Geometry of the Time-dependent Variational Principle in Quantum Mechanics. Lecture Notes in Physics 140, Springer, Berlin 1981
- P. Kramer and R. Neri: On periodic and non-periodic space fillings of E^{m} obtained by projection. In: Acta Crystallogr. A 40, 1984, 580-587 doi:10.1107/S0108767384001203
- P. Kramer and A. Mackay: Crystallography: Some answers but more questions. In: Nature 316, 1985, 17-18 doi:10.1038/316017a0
- P. Kramer: Gateways towards quasicrystals. 2010 arXiv:1101.0061v1
- P. Kramer: Platonic topology and CMB fluctuations: homotopy, anisotropy and multipole selection rules. In: Class. Quantum Grav. 27, 2010, doi:10.1088/0264-9381/27/9/095013
