= Annick Loiseau =

French physicist

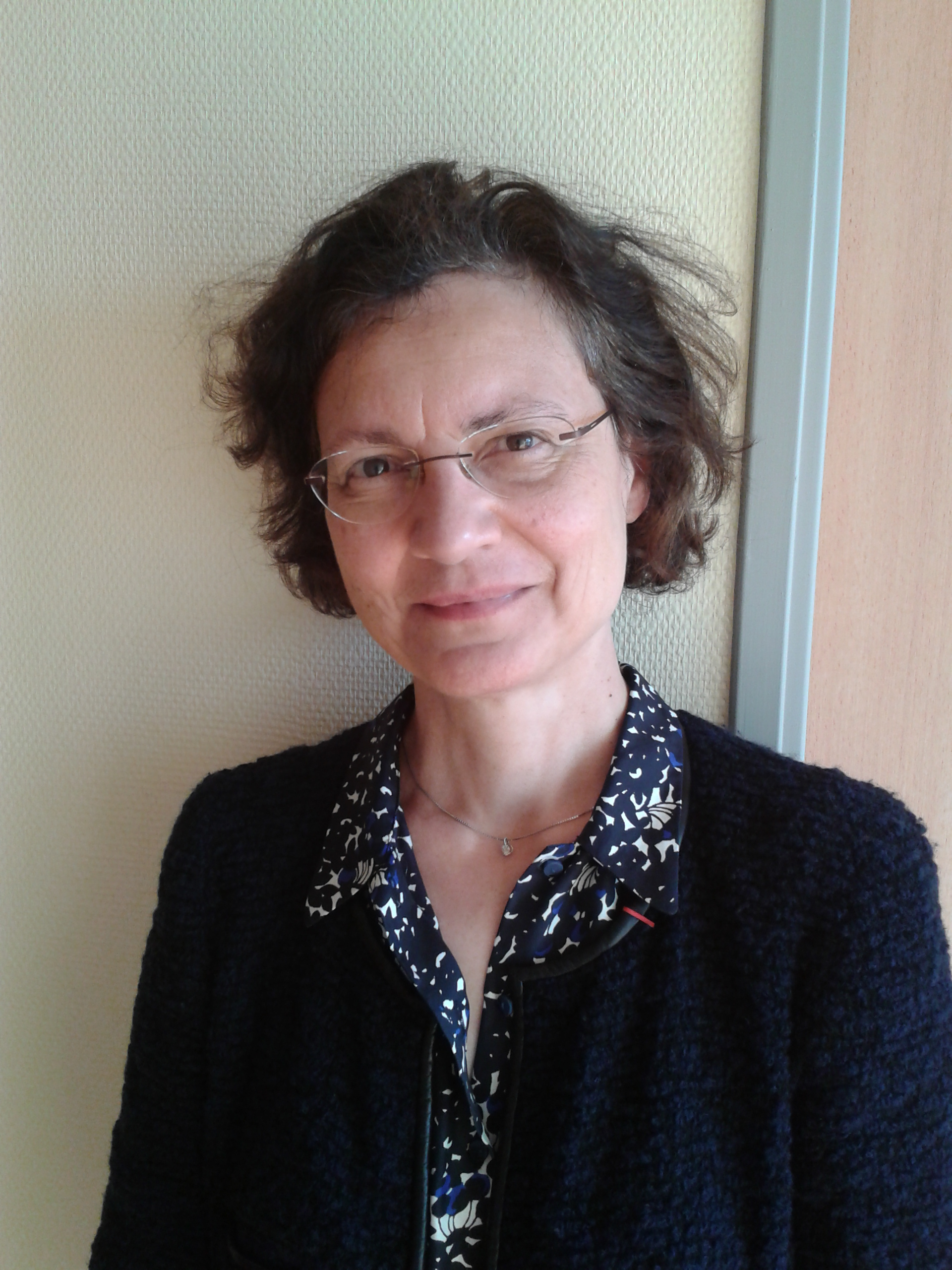
- Born: 1957 (age 68–69)
- Education: Chimie ParisTech; Paris-Sud University
- Known for: Carbon nanotubes 2D materials
- Awards: Legion of Honour (2011); CNRS Silver Medal (2006)
- Scientific career
- Workplaces: ONERA

Annick Loiseau (born 1957) is a French physicist who is a researcher at the French National Centre for Scientific Research Laboratory of Microstructure Studies and Mechanics of Materials. She was the first woman to be appointed to the French national aerospace laboratory,ONERA. Her research considers low-dimensional materials such as carbon nanotubes, graphene, and boron nitride. In 2006 she was awarded the CNRS Silver Medal.

== Early life and education ==
Loiseau studied at Chimie ParisTech. During the end of her studies she completed an internship at the Office National d'Études et de Recherches Aérospatiales (ONERA) solid-state physics laboratory. She moved to the Paris-Sud University for her doctoral studies.

== Research and career ==
Loiseau joined the faculty at ONERA, where she worked on high-resolution electron microscopy, which she developed to study metal alloys. In 1992 she became interested in carbon nanotubes, which had recently been discovered by Sumio Iijima. She started to work on graphene and carbon nanotubes, and eventually led the Graphene-Nanotube Research Group.

In 1996 Loiseau became the first woman to be appointed research director at ONERA. She has focused on transmission electron microscopy electron energy loss spectroscopy (TEM–EELS). Her current research activities focus on synthesis and study of the structural, optical and electronic properties of nanomaterials by optical spectroscopy and TEM-EELS

Loiseau has been involved in the Graphene Flagship since its start in 2013 and is a current member of its executive board.

== Awards and honours ==
- 1988 Grand Prix Aluminum Pechiney of the Academy of Sciences
- 1995 Chimie ParisTech metallurgy medal
- 1999 Louis Ancel Prize of the Société Française de Physique
- 2006 CNRS Silver Medal
- 2011 Legion of Honour

== Selected publications ==
=== Journal articles ===
- Journet, C.; Maser, W. K.; Bernier, P.; Loiseau, A.; de la Chapelle, M. Lamy; Lefrant, S.; Deniard, P.; Lee, R.; Fischer, J. E. (1997). "Large-scale production of single-walled carbon nanotubes by the electric-arc technique". Nature. 388 (6644): 756–758. Bibcode:1997Natur.388..756J. doi:10.1038/41972. ISSN 1476-4687. S2CID 4412706.
- Favron, Alexandre; Gaufrès, Etienne; Fossard, Frédéric; Phaneuf-L’Heureux, Anne-Laurence; Tang, Nathalie Y.-W.; Lévesque, Pierre L.; Loiseau, Annick; Leonelli, Richard; Francoeur, Sébastien; Martel, Richard (2015). "Photooxidation and quantum confinement effects in exfoliated black phosphorus". Nature Materials. 14 (8): 826–832. arXiv:1408.0345. Bibcode:2015NatMa..14..826F. doi:10.1038/nmat4299. ISSN 1476-4660. PMID 26006004.
- Ferrari, Andrea C.; Bonaccorso, Francesco; Fal'ko, Vladimir; Novoselov, Konstantin S.; Roche, Stephan; Bøggild, Peter; Borini, Stefano; Koppens, Frank H. L.; Palermo, Vincenzo; Pugno, Nicola; Garrido, José A. (2015). "Science and technology roadmap for graphene, related two-dimensional crystals, and hybrid systems". Nanoscale. 7 (11): 4598–4810. Bibcode:2015Nanos...7.4598F. doi:10.1039/C4NR01600A. hdl:2117/27112. ISSN 2040-3364. PMID 25707682.

=== Books ===
- Loiseau, Annick; Launois, Pascale; Petit, Pierre; Roche, Stephan; Salvetat, Jean-Paul, eds. (2006). Understanding Carbon Nanotubes. Lecture Notes in Physics. Vol. 677. Bibcode:2006LNP...677.....L. doi:10.1007/b10971390. ISBN 978-3-540-26922-9. ISSN 0075-8450.
