= Frank Koppens =

Dutch physicist (born 1976)

- Born: Frank H. L. Koppens; June 27, 1976 (age 50); Netherlands
- Education: Eindhoven University of Technology (MSc); Delft University of Technology (PhD)
- Known for: Graphene plasmonics, nano-optoelectronics, near-field imaging of moiré materials
- Awards: IUPAP Young Scientist Prize in Optics (2015); Christiaan Huygens Prize (2011); Fellow of the American Physical Society (2022)
- Scientific career
- Fields: Condensed matter physics Nanophotonics; Graphene and 2D materials
- Workplaces: ICFO – The Institute of Photonic Sciences; ICREA; Harvard University (postdoc)
- Thesis: Coherence and control of a single electron spin in a quantum dot (2007)
- Doctoral advisor: Leo Kouwenhoven
- Website: koppensgroup.icfo.eu

Frank H. L. Koppens (born 27 June 1976) is a Dutch experimental physicist. He is an ICREA Research Professor and group leader of the Quantum Nano-Optoelectronics group at ICFO – The Institute of Photonic Sciences in Castelldefels, near Barcelona, Spain. His research concerns the interaction of light with graphene and other two-dimensional materials, including graphene plasmonics, nano-optoelectronic devices, terahertz optoelectronics and the near-field optical imaging of moiré materials.

== Education and early career ==
Koppens studied physics at Eindhoven University of Technology, where he received a Master of Science degree cum laude in 2001. He carried out his doctoral research from 2003 to 2007 in the Quantum Transport group at the Kavli Institute of Nanoscience of Delft University of Technology, obtaining his PhD cum laude in 2007 with a thesis titled Coherence and control of a single electron spin in a quantum dot, under the promotorship of Leo Kouwenhoven with supervision by Lieven Vandersypen.

From 2008 to 2010 he was a postdoctoral fellow at the Institute for Quantum Science and Engineering at Harvard University.

== Career ==
In 2010 Koppens joined ICFO – The Institute of Photonic Sciences as a professor and group leader of the Nano-Optoelectronics (later Quantum Nano-Optoelectronics) group. Since 2015 he has been an ICREA Research Professor.

In 2020 he co-founded Qurv Technologies, a spin-off company developing wide-spectrum image sensors based on graphene and quantum dot technologies, and in 2024 he co-founded Axiomatic AI, a company developing interpretable artificial intelligence for science and engineering.

== Research ==
Koppens's group studies the fundamental science and applications of two-dimensional materials and their interaction with light at the nanoscale. His work spans solid-state physics, graphene and 2D materials, moiré materials, near-field imaging, terahertz optoelectronics, nano-optoelectronic devices and quantum nanophotonics.

Among his contributions, his group reported real-space imaging of propagating, gate-tunable plasmons in graphene, and later probed the ultimate confinement limits of graphene plasmons using van der Waals heterostructures. A 2014 review article on photodetectors based on graphene and other two-dimensional materials was co-authored by Koppens.

== Awards and honours ==
- 2015 – ICO/IUPAP Young Scientist Prize in Optics, International Commission for Optics / International Union of Pure and Applied Physics
- 2019 – ACS Photonics Young Investigator Award Lectureship
- 2022 – Fellow of the American Physical Society

== Selected publications ==
- Koppens, F. H. L.; Mueller, T.; Avouris, P.; Ferrari, A. C.; Vitiello, M. S.; Polini, M. (2014). "Photodetectors based on graphene, other two-dimensional materials and hybrid systems". Nature Nanotechnology. 9 (10): 780–793. doi:10.1038/nnano.2014.215.
- Koppens, F. H. L.; Chang, D. E.; García de Abajo, F. J. (2011). "Graphene plasmonics: a platform for strong light–matter interactions". Nano Letters. 11 (8): 3370–3377. arXiv:1104.2068. doi:10.1021/nl201771h.
- Alcaraz Iranzo, D.; et al. (2018). "Probing the ultimate plasmon confinement limits with a van der Waals heterostructure". Science. 360 (6386): 291–295. arXiv:1804.01061. doi:10.1126/science.aar8438.
