= Annick Horiuchi =

French historian of science

Annick Mito Horiuchi is a French historian of mathematics and historian of science. She is a professor at Paris Diderot University, where she is associated with the Centre de recherche sur les civilisations de l'Asie orientale (CRCAO).

Horiuchi completed a doctorate in 1990; her dissertation, "Etude de Seki Takakazu (?-1708) et Takebe Katahiro (1664-1739), deux mathématiciens de l'époque d'edo" (litt. A study of Seki Takakazu (?-1708) and Takebe Katahiro (1664-1739), two mathematicians of the Edo Period), was directed by Paul Akamatsu. She was an invited speaker at the 1990 International Congress of Mathematicians.

== Books ==
Horiuchi's books include:

- Les mathématiques japonaises à l’époque d’Edo (1600-1868) — une étude des travaux de Seki Takakazu (?-1708) et de Takebe Katahiro (1664-1739), Mathesis 1994, translated into English as Japanese Mathematics in the Edo Period (1600–1868): A study of the works of Seki Takakazu (?–1708) and Takebe Katahiro (1664–1739), Birkhäuser 2010.
- Repenser l'ordre, repenser l'héritage: Paysage intellectuel du Japon (xviie-xixe siècles), edited with Frédéric Girard and Mieko Macé, Droz 2002.
- Traduire, transposer, naturaliser: La formation d’une langue scientifique moderne hors des frontières de l’Europe au XIXe siècle, edited with Pascal Crozet, l'Harmattan, 2004.
- Listen, Copy, Read: Popular Learning in Early Modern Japan, edited with Matthias Hayek, Brill, 2014.
