= John Launois =

French photojournalist (1928–2002)

John Launois (born Jean René Launois; November 23, 1928 – May 5, 2002) was a noted international photojournalist. His work appeared in Life (magazine), The Saturday Evening Post, National Geographic (magazine), Fortune (magazine), Time (magazine), Newsweek, Look, Rolling Stone, Paris Match, The Sunday Times, and other American, European, and Asian publications.

Born Jean René Launois in Marly-le-Roi, France, to Marguerite and Paul Launois, he was the oldest of six children and grew up during the Nazi occupation. During his youth, he found work in Paris as a photographer’s assistant until he was drafted into the French army. After being discharged, he earned enough money to travel to America in order to pursue his dream of becoming a photojournalist. He served two years as a military photographer in the U.S. Army and became an American citizen in 1954.

Represented by the Black Star photo agency in New York, Launois took many notable images of the 1950s, 60s and 70s, including life behind the Iron Curtain for Life magazine, the discovery of a modern day Stone Age tribe for National Geographic, human rights activist Malcolm X in Cairo, Egypt during his final pilgrimage, as well as the rise of rock stars such as the Beatles and Bob Dylan for the Saturday Evening Post, among others.

His life and work are the subject of the book “L’Americain: A Photojournalist’s Life.”
