= Robert Alnwick =

Member of the Parliament of England

Robert Alnwick was an English politician who was Member of Parliament for Scarborough in 1393.
