= Battle of Alnwick =

Battle of Alnwick may refer to:

- Battle of Alnwick (1093), Alnwick, Northumberland, in which Malcolm III of Scotland invaded England
- Battle of Alnwick (1174), Alnwick, Northumberland, in which William I of Scotland invaded England
