= Aperiodic crystal =

Crystal type lacking 3D periodicity

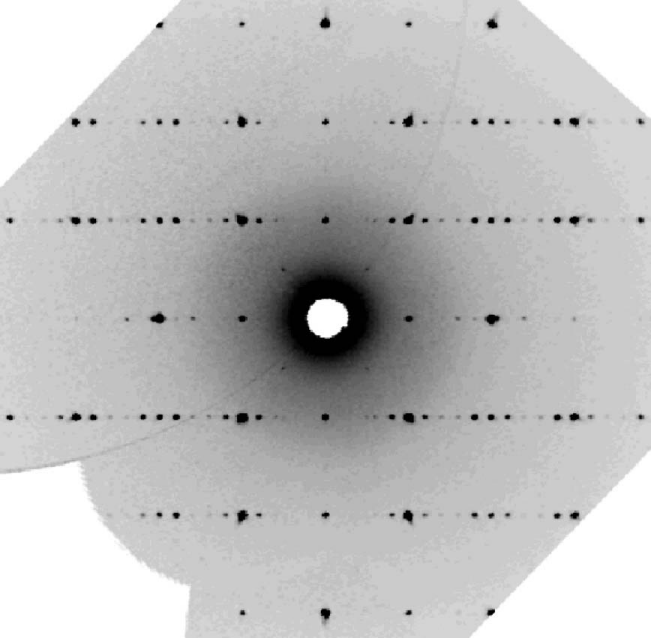
Reciprocal Space

Aperiodic crystals are crystals that lack translational symmetry in at least one dimension, but still exhibit long-range order in 3 dimensions. Where as traditional crystals can be viewed by a unit cell containing some set of matter (atoms, molecules, ions, etc) repeated in 3 dimension, an aperiodic crystal has at least some feature which cannot be described in this manner, but does have some defined rule by which it is arranged such that, knowing a finite portion of the structure, you could predict the rest of the structure. They are classified into three different categories: incommensurate modulated structures, incommensurate composite structures, and quasicrystals.

== In X-ray crystallography ==
The X-ray diffraction patterns of aperiodic crystals contain two sets of peaks, which include "main reflections" and "satellite reflections". Main reflections are usually stronger in intensity and span a lattice defined by three-dimensional reciprocal lattice vectors$(a^*, b^*, c^*)$. Satellite reflections are weaker in intensity and are known as "lattice ghosts". These reflections do not correspond to any lattice points in physical space and cannot be indexed with the original three vectors.

== History ==
The study of aperiodic crystals began in the early 20th century when X-ray crystallography was still developing. Back then, scientists believed that matter in its most stable form was always a perfect crystal with a repeating pattern in three dimensions. But in the late 1900s, new discoveries in crystallography challenged this idea. Researchers started analyzing X-ray scattering beyond the usual bright spots (Bragg peaks), which helped them understand how defects, size limitations, and other factors affected crystal structures. They also noticed extra spots in diffraction patterns, caused by repeating variations in the crystal structure. These discoveries showed that not all stable structures were perfect crystals—some were more complex. These complex structures were later called aperiodic crystals, and they continue to be a key focus in crystallography research.

== Mathematics of the superspace approach ==
To understand aperiodic crystal structures, one must use the superspace approach. In materials science, "superspace" or higher-dimensional space refers to the concept of describing the structures and properties of materials in terms of dimensions beyond the three dimensions of physical space. This may involve using mathematical models to describe the behavior of atoms or molecules in a materials in four, five, or even higher dimensions.

Aperiodic crystals can be understood as a three-dimensional physical space wherein atoms are positioned, plus the additional dimensions of the second subspace.

=== Superspace ===
Dimensionalities of aperiodic crystals:

- $3 + 1d$,
- $3 + 2d$,
- $3 + 3d$.

The "$3$" represents the dimensions of the first subspace, which is also called the "external space" ($V_E$) or "parallel space" ($V^{II}$).

The "$d$" represents the additional dimension of the second subspace, which is also called "internal space" ($V_I$) or "perpendicular space" ($V^\perp$). It is perpendicular to the first subspace.

- $V = V_E \oplus V_I$

In summary, superspace is the direct sum of two subspaces. With the superspace approach, we can now describe a three-dimensional aperiodic structure as a higher dimensional periodic structure.

=== Peak indexing ===
To index all Bragg peaks, both main and satellite reflections, additional lattice vectors must be introduced:

- $s(3+1) = ha^* + kb^* + lc^* + mq$,
- $s(3+2) = ha^* + kb^* + lc^* + mq_1 + nq_2$,
- $s(3+3) = ha^* + kb^* + lc^* + mq_1 + nq_2 + pq_3$.

With respect to the three reciprocal lattice vectors $(a*, b*, c*)$ spanned by the main reflection, the fourth vector $q$ can be expressed by

- $q = \sigma_1a^* + \sigma_2b^* + \sigma_3c^*$.

$q$ is modulation wave vector, which represents the direction and wavelength of the modulation wave through the crystal structure.

If at least one of the $\sigma$ values is an irrational number, then the structure is considered to be "incommensurately modulated".

With the superspace approach, we can project the diffraction pattern from a higher-dimensional space to three-dimensional space.

== Example ==
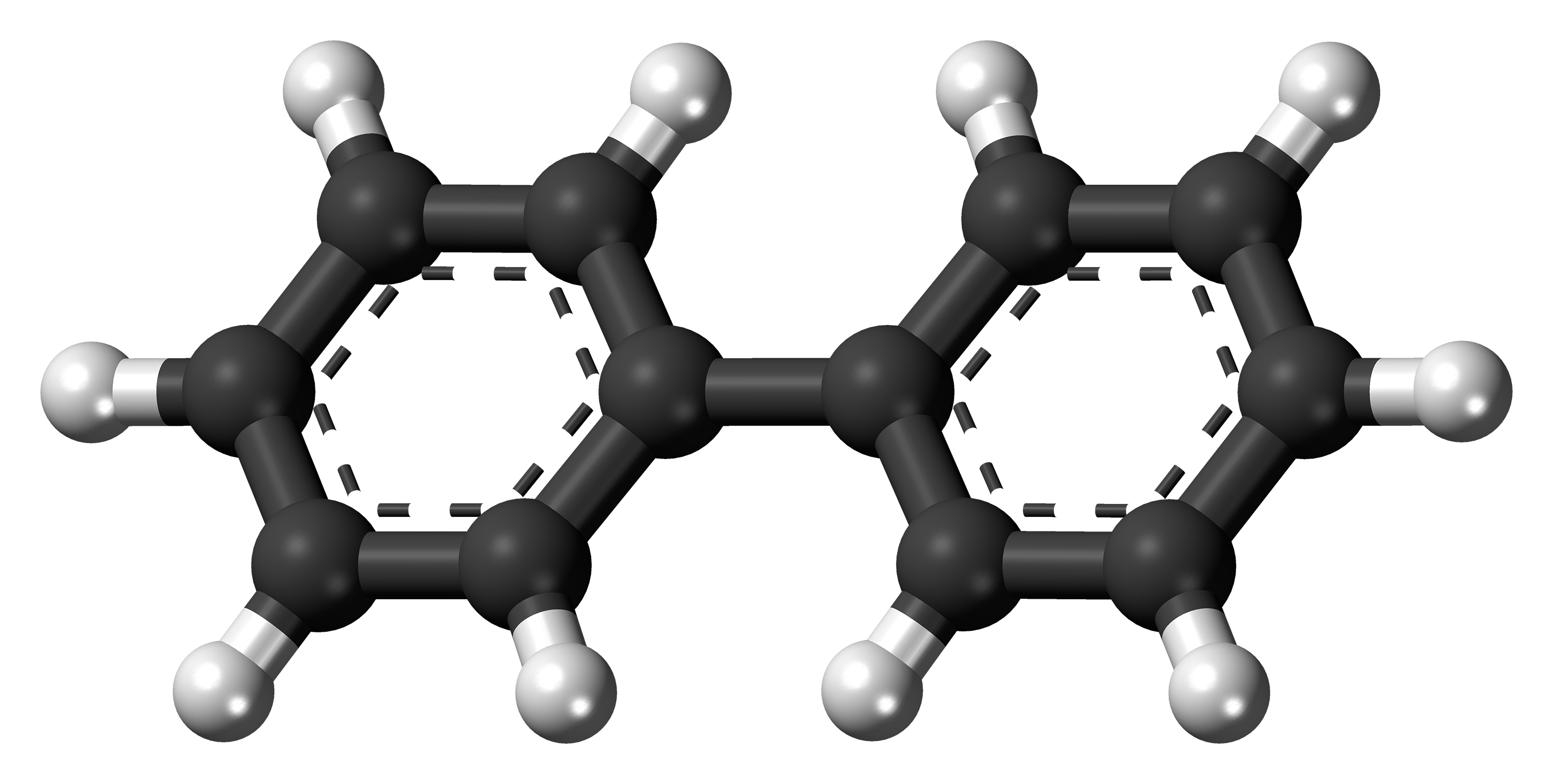
Biphenyl molecule

=== Biphenyl ===
The biphenyl molecule is a simple organic molecular compound consisting of two phenyl rings bonded by a central C-C single bond, which exhibits a modulated molecular crystal structure. Two competing factors are important for the molecule's conformation. One is steric hindrance of ortho-hydrogen, which leads to the repulsion between electrons and causes torsion of the molecule. As a result, the conformation of the molecule is non-planar, which often occurs when biphenyl is in the gas phase. The other factor is the $\pi$-electron effect which favors coplanarity of the two planes. This is often the case when biphenyl is at room temperature.
