= Holmium–magnesium–zinc quasicrystal =

Dodecahedral quasicrystal

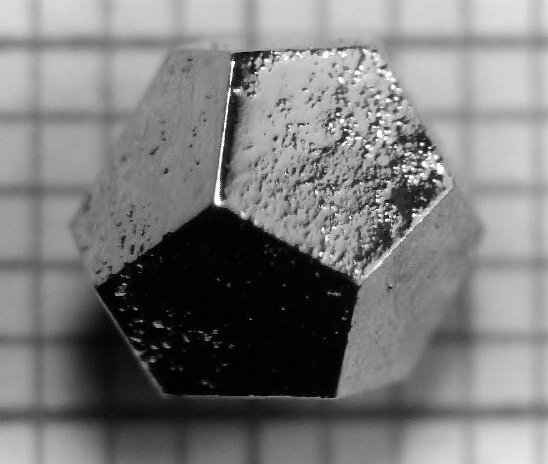
A Ho–Mg–Zn quasicrystal in the shape of a dodecahedron.

A holmium–magnesium–zinc (Ho–Mg–Zn) quasicrystal is a quasicrystal made of an alloy of the three metals holmium, magnesium and zinc that has the shape of a regular dodecahedron, a Platonic solid with 12 five-sided faces. Unlike the similar pyritohedron shape of some cubic-system crystals such as pyrite, this quasicrystal has faces that are true regular pentagons.

The crystal is part of the R–Mg–Zn family of crystals, where R=Y, Gd, Tb, Dy, Ho or Er. They were first discovered in 1994. These form quasicrystals in the stoichiometry around R_{9}Mg_{34}Zn_{57}. Magnetically, they form a spin glass at cryogenic temperatures.

While the experimental discovery of quasicrystals dates back to the 1980s, the relatively large, single grain nature of some Ho–Mg–Zn quasicrystals has made them a popular way to illustrate the concept.

== See also ==
- Complex metallic alloys
