= Pascale Launois =

French crystallographer

Pascale Launois is a French crystallographer whose research has included the study of quasicrystals, carbon nanotubes, and their environmental applications. She is a director of research for the French National Centre for Scientific Research (CNRS), affiliated with the Laboratoire de Physique des Solides at Paris-Saclay University.

She is president of the French Neutronics Society (Société Française de la Neutronique).

== Education and career ==
After earlier student work in theoretical physics, Launois turned to experimental studies. She earned a Ph.D. in physics in 1987 through the Laboratoire Léon Brillouin at Paris-Saclay University; her thesis concerned incommensurate phases in neutron scattering.

She joined CNRS in 1988, and has been affiliated with the Laboratoire de Physique des Solides since 1993. Her early work continued the study of incommensurable phases and quasicrystals, through X-ray scattering techniques; her interests shifted to the study of carbon nanotubes in the early 2000s.

Launois was very active in promoting science to the public through the International Year of Crystallography, in 2014. She was elected president of the French Neutronics Society in 2024.

== Recognition ==
Launois was a recipient of the CNRS Bronze Medal in 1991. The magazine La Recherche gave her their Prix de la Recherche, for her research with Philippe Poulin and Cécile Zakri on carbon nanotubes. She was the 2024 recipient of the André Guinier Prize of the French Crystallographic Association.
