= Quasicrystal =

Ordered chemical structure with no repeating pattern

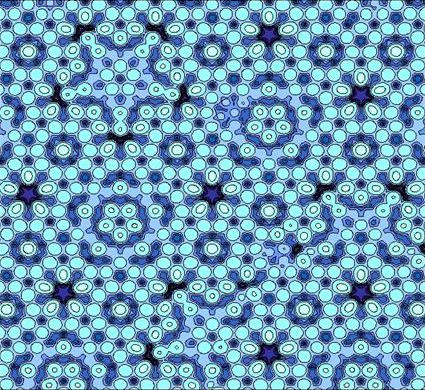
Potential energy surface for silver depositing on an aluminium–palladium–manganese (Al–Pd–Mn) quasicrystal surface. Similar to Fig. 6 in Ref.

A quasiperiodic crystal, or quasicrystal, is a structure that is ordered but not periodic. A quasicrystalline pattern can continuously fill all available space, but it lacks translational symmetry. The discovery demonstrated that the presence of long-range order is not necessarily associated with periodicity. While crystals, according to the classical crystallographic restriction theorem, can possess only two-, three-, four-, and six-fold rotational symmetries, the Bragg diffraction pattern of quasicrystals shows sharp peaks with other symmetry orders—for instance, five-fold.

Aperiodic tilings were discovered by mathematicians in the early 1960s, and some twenty years later, they were found to apply to the study of natural quasicrystals. The discovery of these aperiodic forms in nature has produced a paradigm shift in the field of crystallography. In crystallography, the quasicrystals were predicted in 1981 by a five-fold symmetry study of Alan Lindsay Mackay,—that also brought in 1982, with the crystallographic Fourier transform of a Penrose tiling, the possibility of identifying quasiperiodic order in a material through diffraction.

Quasicrystals had been investigated and observed earlier, but, until the 1980s, they were disregarded in favor of the prevailing views about the atomic structure of matter. In 2009, after a dedicated search, a mineralogical finding, icosahedrite, offered evidence for the existence of natural quasicrystals.

Roughly, an ordering is non-periodic if it lacks translational symmetry, which means that a shifted copy will never match exactly with its original. The more precise mathematical definition is that there is never translational symmetry in more than n – 1 linearly independent directions, where n is the dimension of the space filled, e.g., the three-dimensional tiling displayed in a quasicrystal may have translational symmetry in two directions. Symmetrical diffraction patterns result from the existence of an indefinitely large number of elements with regular spacing, a property loosely described as long-range order. Experimentally, the aperiodicity is revealed in the unusual symmetry of the diffraction pattern, that is, symmetry of orders other than two, three, four, or six.

In 1982, materials scientist Dan Shechtman observed that certain aluminium–manganese alloys produced unusual diffractograms, which today are seen as revelatory of quasicrystal structures. Due to fear of the scientific community's reaction, it took him two years to publish the results. Shechtman's discovery challenged the long-held belief that all crystals are periodic. Observed in a rapidly solidified Al-Mn alloy, quasicrystals exhibited icosahedral symmetry, which was previously thought impossible in crystallography. This breakthrough, supported by theoretical models and experimental evidence, led to a paradigm shift in the understanding of solid-state matter. Despite initial skepticism, the discovery gained widespread acceptance, prompting the International Union of Crystallography to redefine the term "crystal". The work ultimately earned Shechtman the 2011 Nobel Prize in Chemistry and inspired significant advancements in materials science and mathematics.

On 25 October 2018, Luca Bindi and Paul Steinhardt were awarded the Aspen Institute 2018 Prize for collaboration and scientific research between Italy and the United States after discovering icosahedrite, the first quasicrystal known to occur naturally.

== History ==
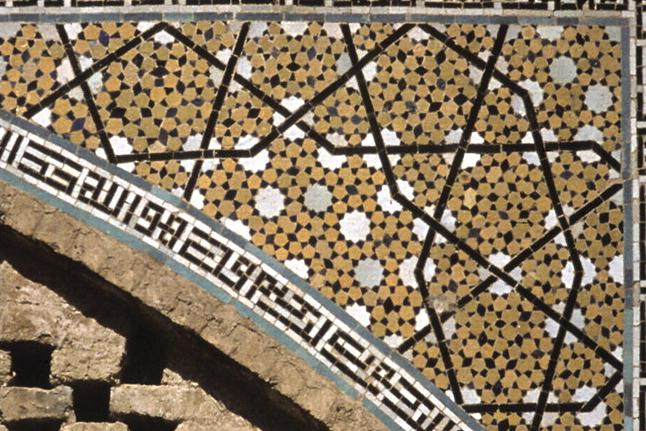
Girih-tile subdivision found in the decagonal girih pattern on a spandrel from the Darb-i Imam shrine, Isfahan, Iran (1453 C.E.). A subdivision rule to construct perfect quasi-crystalline tilings has been identified

The first representations of perfect quasicrystalline patterns can be found in several early Islamic works of art and architecture such as the Gunbad-i-Kabud tomb tower, the Darb-e Imam shrine and the Al-Attarine Madrasa. On July 16, 1945, in Alamogordo, New Mexico, the Trinity nuclear bomb test produced icosahedral quasicrystals. They went unnoticed at the time of the test but were later identified in samples of red trinitite, a glass-like substance formed from fused sand and copper transmission lines. Identified in 2021, they are the oldest known anthropogenic quasicrystals.

A section of a Penrose tiling

In 1961, Hao Wang asked whether determining if a set of tiles admits a tiling of the plane is an algorithmically unsolvable problem or not. He conjectured that it is solvable, relying on the hypothesis that every set of tiles that can tile the plane can do it periodically (hence, it would suffice to try to tile bigger and bigger patterns until obtaining one that tiles periodically). Nevertheless, two years later, his student Robert Berger constructed a set of some 20,000 square tiles (now called Wang tiles) that can tile the plane but not in a periodic fashion. As further aperiodic sets of tiles were discovered, sets with fewer and fewer shapes were found. In 1974 Roger Penrose discovered a set of just two tiles, now referred to as Penrose tiles, that produced only non-periodic tilings of the plane. These tilings displayed instances of fivefold symmetry. One year later Alan Mackay showed theoretically that the diffraction pattern from the Penrose tiling had a two-dimensional Fourier transform consisting of sharp 'delta' peaks arranged in a fivefold symmetric pattern. Around the same time, Robert Ammann created a set of aperiodic tiles that produced eightfold symmetry.

In 1972, R. M. de Wolf and W. van Aalst reported that the diffraction pattern produced by a crystal of sodium carbonate cannot be labeled with three indices but needed one more, which implied that the underlying structure had four dimensions in reciprocal space. Other puzzling cases have been reported, but until the concept of quasicrystal came to be established, they were explained away or denied.

Dan Shechtman first observed ten-fold electron diffraction patterns in 1982, while conducting a routine study of an aluminium–manganese alloy, Al_{6}Mn, at the US National Bureau of Standards (later NIST). Shechtman related his observation to Ilan Blech, who responded that such diffractions had been seen before. Around that time, Shechtman also related his finding to John W. Cahn of the NIST, who did not offer any explanation and challenged him to solve the observation. Shechtman quoted Cahn as saying: "Danny, this material is telling us something, and I challenge you to find out what it is".

The observation of the ten-fold diffraction pattern lay unexplained for two years until the spring of 1984, when Blech asked Shechtman to show him his results again. A quick study of Shechtman's results showed that the common explanation for a ten-fold symmetrical diffraction pattern, a type of crystal twinning, was ruled out by his experiments. Therefore, Blech looked for a new structure containing cells connected to each other by defined angles and distances but without translational periodicity. He decided to use a computer simulation to calculate the diffraction intensity from a cluster of such a material, which he termed as "multiple polyhedral", and found a ten-fold structure similar to what was observed. The multiple polyhedral structure was termed later by many researchers as icosahedral glass.

Shechtman accepted Blech's discovery of a new type of material and chose to publish his observation in a paper entitled "The Microstructure of Rapidly Solidified Al_{6}Mn", which was written around June 1984 and published in a 1985 edition of Metallurgical Transactions A. Meanwhile, on seeing the draft of the paper, John Cahn suggested that Shechtman's experimental results merit a fast publication in a more appropriate scientific journal. Shechtman agreed and, in hindsight, called this fast publication "a winning move". This paper, published in the Physical Review Letters, repeated Shechtman's observation and used the same illustrations as the original paper.

Originally, the new form of matter was dubbed "Shechtmanite". The term "quasicrystal" was first used in print by Paul Steinhardt and Dov Levine shortly after Shechtman's paper was published.

Also in 1985, T. Ishimasa et al. reported twelvefold symmetry in Ni-Cr particles. Soon, eightfold diffraction patterns were recorded in V-Ni-Si and Cr-Ni-Si alloys. Over the years, hundreds of quasicrystals with various compositions and different symmetries have been discovered. The first quasicrystalline materials were thermodynamically unstable: when heated, they formed regular crystals. However, in 1987, the first of many stable quasicrystals were discovered, making it possible to produce large samples for study and applications.

In 1992, the International Union of Crystallography altered its definition of a crystal, reducing it to the ability to produce a clear-cut diffraction pattern and acknowledging the possibility of the ordering to be either periodic or aperiodic.

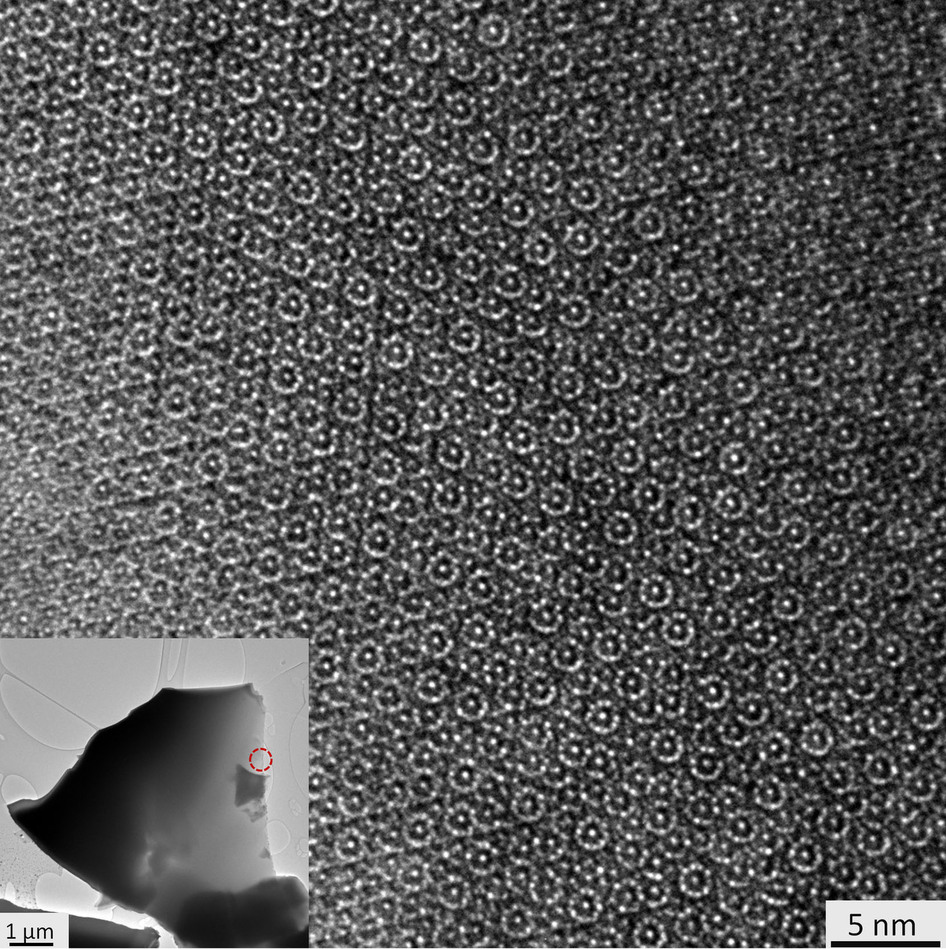
Atomic image of a micron-sized grain of the natural Al_{71}Ni_{24}Fe_{5} quasicrystal (shown in the inset) from a Khatyrka meteorite fragment. The corresponding diffraction patterns reveal a ten-fold symmetry.

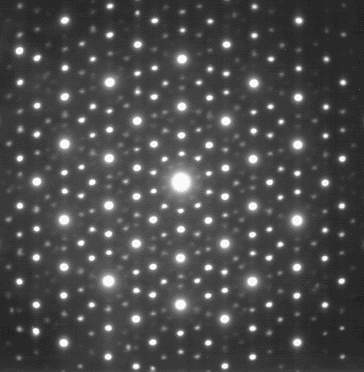
Electron diffraction pattern of an icosahedral Ho–Mg–Zn quasicrystal

In 2001, Steinhardt hypothesized that quasicrystals could exist in nature and developed a method of recognition, inviting all the mineralogical collections of the world to identify any badly cataloged crystals. In 2007 Steinhardt received a reply by Luca Bindi, who found a quasicrystalline specimen from Khatyrka in the University of Florence Mineralogical Collection. The crystal samples were sent to Princeton University for other tests, and in late 2009, Steinhardt confirmed its quasicrystalline character. This quasicrystal, with a composition of Al_{63}Cu_{24}Fe_{13}, was named icosahedrite and it was approved by the International Mineralogical Association in 2010. Analysis indicates it may be meteoritic in origin, possibly delivered from a carbonaceous chondrite asteroid. In 2011, Bindi, Steinhardt, and a team of specialists found more icosahedrite samples from Khatyrka. A further study of Khatyrka meteorites revealed micron-sized grains of another natural quasicrystal, which has a ten-fold symmetry and a chemical formula of Al_{71}Ni_{24}Fe_{5}. This quasicrystal is stable in a narrow temperature range, from 1120 to 1200 K at ambient pressure, which suggests that natural quasicrystals are formed by rapid quenching of a meteorite heated during an impact-induced shock.

Quasicrystals have been identified not only in synthetic alloys and meteorites, but also in materials formed under extreme conditions, including those produced by nuclear explosions and, more recently, in fulgurites, rocks formed by lightning strikes.

Shechtman was awarded the Nobel Prize in Chemistry in 2011 for his work on quasicrystals. "His discovery of quasicrystals revealed a new principle for packing of atoms and molecules," stated the Nobel Committee and pointed that "this led to a paradigm shift within chemistry." In 2014, Post of Israel issued a stamp dedicated to quasicrystals and the 2011 Nobel Prize.

While the first quasicrystals discovered were made out of intermetallic components, later on quasicrystals were also discovered in soft-matter and molecular systems. Soft quasicrystal structures have been found in supramolecular dendrimer liquids and ABC Star Polymers in 2004 and 2007. In 2009, it was found that thin-film quasicrystals can be formed by self-assembly of uniformly shaped, nano-sized molecular units at an air-liquid interface. It was demonstrated that these units can be both inorganic and organic. Additionally in the 2010s, two-dimensional molecular quasicrystals were discovered, driven by intermolecular interactions and interface-interactions.

In 2018, chemists from Brown University announced the successful creation of a self-constructing lattice structure based on a strangely shaped quantum dot. While single-component quasicrystal lattices have been previously predicted mathematically and in computer simulations, they had not been demonstrated prior to this.

== Mathematics ==
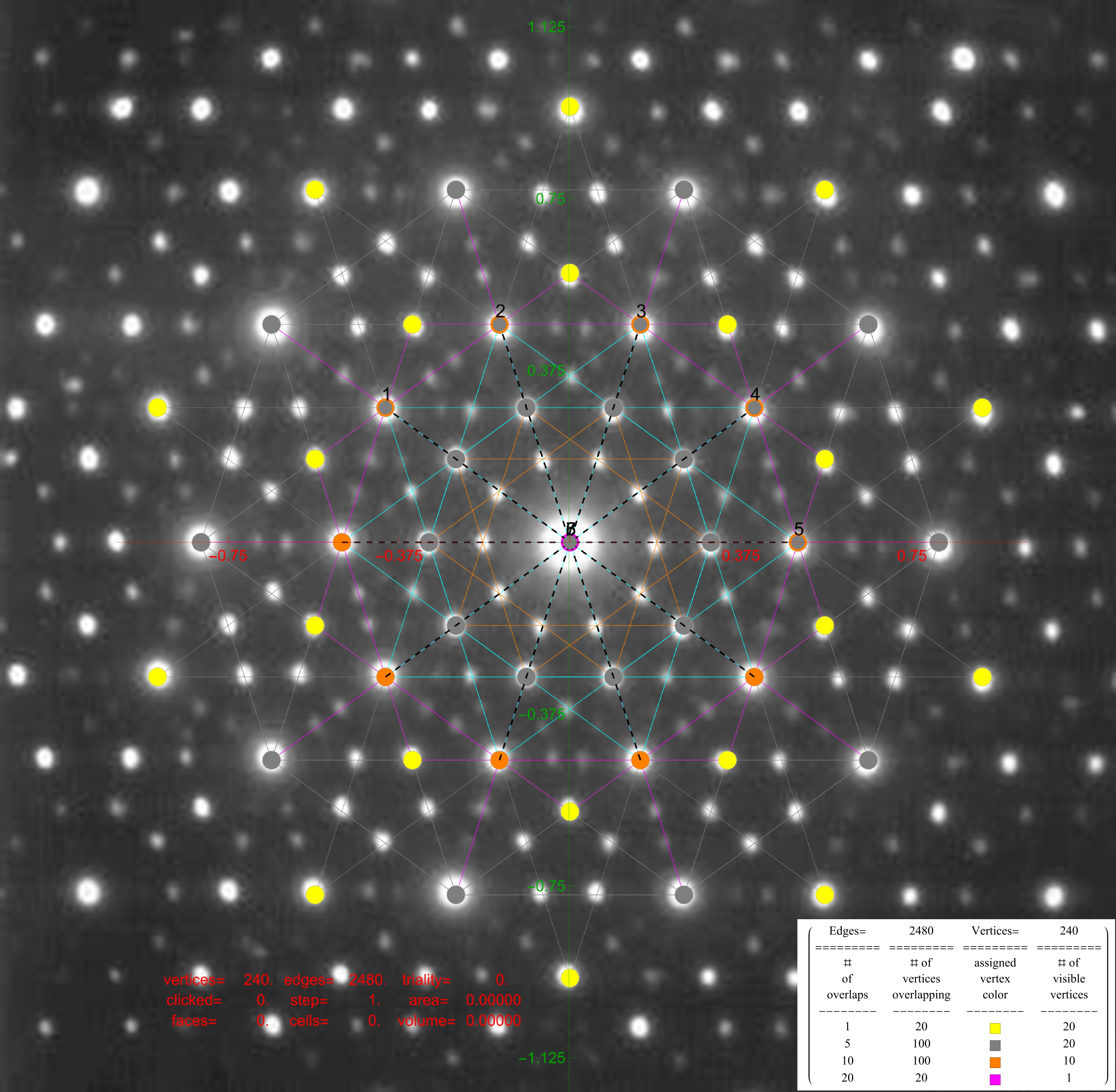
A 5-cube as an orthographic projection into 2D using Petrie polygon basis vectors overlaid on the diffractogram from an icosahedral Ho–Mg–Zn quasicrystal

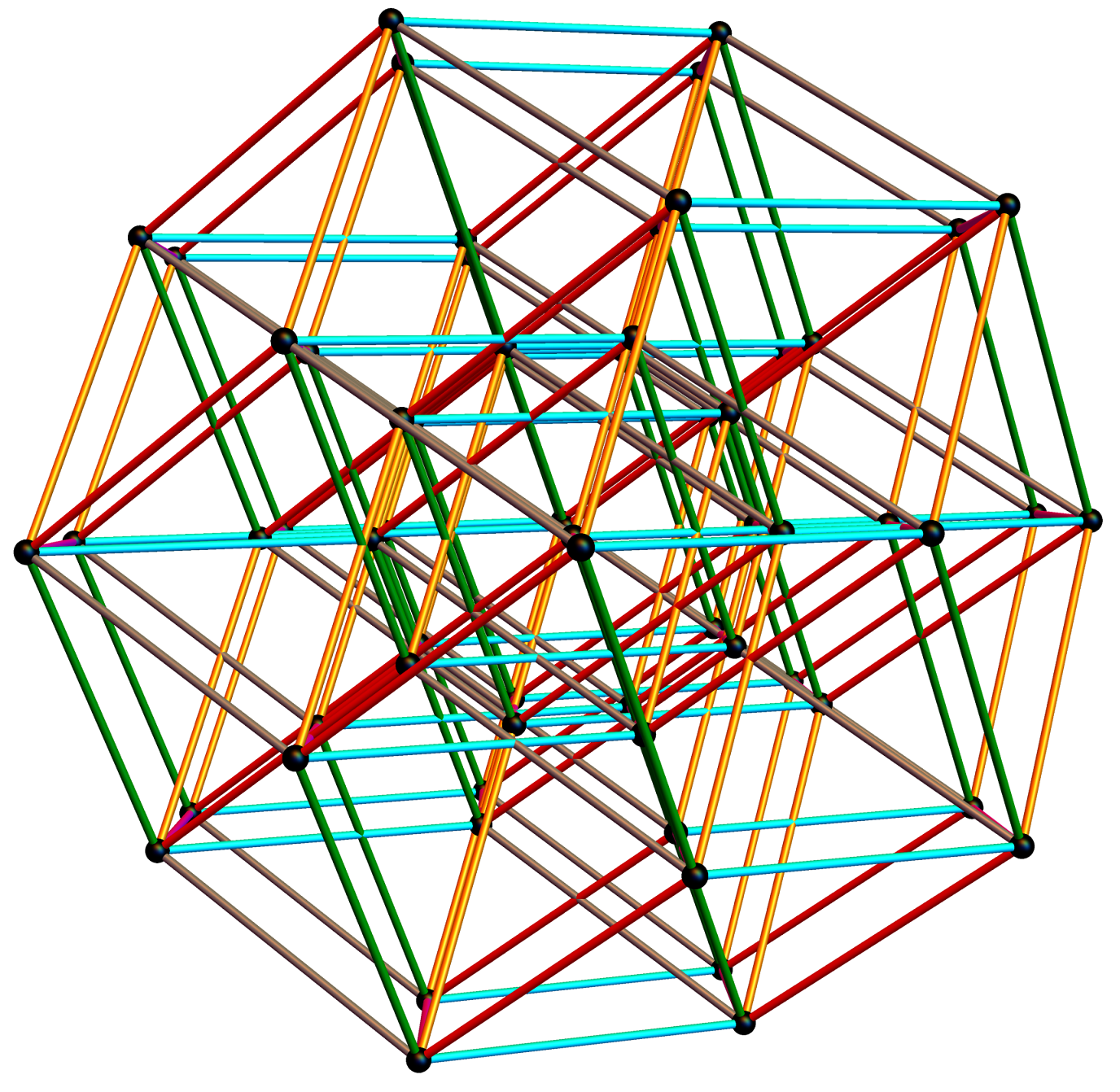
A 6-cube projected into the rhombic triacontahedron using the golden ratio in the basis vectors. This is used to understand the aperiodic icosahedral structure of quasicrystals.

There are several ways to mathematically define quasicrystalline patterns. One definition, the "cut and project" construction, is based on the work of Harald Bohr (mathematician brother of Niels Bohr). The concept of an almost periodic function (also called a quasiperiodic function) was studied by Bohr, including work of Bohl and Escanglon. He introduced the notion of a superspace. Bohr showed that quasiperiodic functions arise as restrictions of high-dimensional periodic functions to an irrational slice (an intersection with one or more hyperplanes), and discussed their Fourier point spectrum. These functions are not exactly periodic, but they are arbitrarily close in some sense, as well as being a projection of an exactly periodic function.

In order that the quasicrystal itself be aperiodic, this slice must avoid any lattice plane of the higher-dimensional lattice. De Bruijn showed that Penrose tilings can be viewed as two-dimensional slices of five-dimensional hypercubic structures; similarly, icosahedral quasicrystals in three dimensions are projected from a six-dimensional hypercubic lattice, as first described by Peter Kramer and Roberto Neri in 1984. Equivalently, the Fourier transform of such a quasicrystal is nonzero only at a dense set of points spanned by integer multiples of a finite set of basis vectors, which are the projections of the primitive reciprocal lattice vectors of the higher-dimensional lattice.

The classical theory of crystals reduces crystals to point lattices where each point is the center of mass of one of the identical units of the crystal. The structure of crystals can be analyzed by defining an associated group. Quasicrystals, on the other hand, are composed of more than one type of unit, so, instead of lattices, quasilattices must be used. Instead of groups, groupoids, the mathematical generalization of groups in category theory, is the appropriate tool for studying quasicrystals.

Using mathematics for construction and analysis of quasicrystal structures is a difficult task. Computer modeling, based on the existing theories of quasicrystals, however, greatly facilitated this task. Advanced programs have been developed allowing one to construct, visualize and analyze quasicrystal structures and their diffraction patterns. The aperiodic nature of quasicrystals can also make theoretical studies of physical properties, such as electronic structure, difficult due to the inapplicability of Bloch's theorem. However, spectra of quasicrystals can still be computed with error control.

Study of quasicrystals may shed light on the most basic notions related to the quantum critical point observed in heavy fermion metals. Experimental measurements on an Au–Al–Yb quasicrystal have revealed a quantum critical point defining the divergence of the magnetic susceptibility as temperature tends to zero. It is suggested that the electronic system of some quasicrystals is located at a quantum critical point without tuning, while quasicrystals exhibit the typical scaling behaviour of their thermodynamic properties and belong to the well-known family of heavy fermion metals.

== Materials science ==
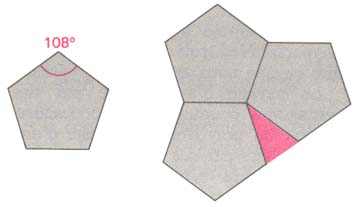
Tiling of a plane by regular pentagons is impossible but can be realized on a sphere in the form of pentagonal dodecahedron.

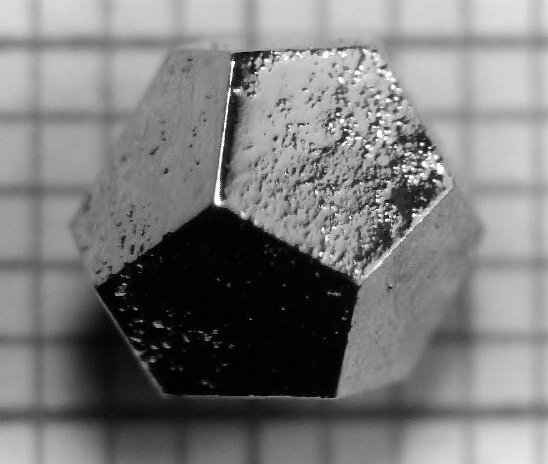
A Ho–Mg–Zn dodecahedral quasicrystal formed as a pentagonal dodecahedron, the dual of the icosahedron. Unlike the similar pyritohedron shape of some cubic-system crystals such as pyrite, the quasicrystal has faces that are true regular pentagons

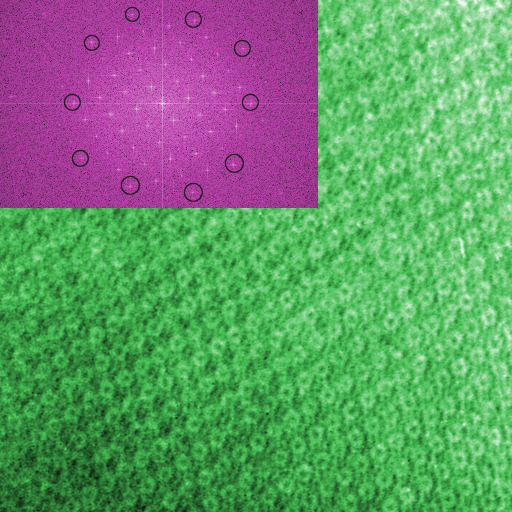
TiMn quasicrystal approximant lattice

Since the original discovery by Dan Shechtman, hundreds of quasicrystals have been reported and confirmed. Quasicrystals are found most often in aluminium alloys (Al–Li–Cu, Al–Mn–Si, Al–Ni–Co, Al–Pd–Mn, Al–Cu–Fe, Al–Cu–V, etc.), but numerous other compositions are also known (Cd–Yb, Ti–Zr–Ni, Zn–Mg–Ho, Zn–Mg–Sc, In–Ag–Yb, Pd–U–Si, etc.). The molecular compound ferrocenecarboxylic acid is also known to form a quasicrystal in two dimensions.

Two types of quasicrystals are known. The first type, polygonal (dihedral) quasicrystals, have an axis of 8-, 10-, or 12-fold local symmetry (octagonal, decagonal, or dodecagonal quasicrystals, respectively). They are periodic along this axis or two-dimensional, and quasiperiodic in planes normal to it. The second type, icosahedral quasicrystals, are aperiodic in all directions. Icosahedral quasicrystals have a three dimensional quasiperiodic structure and possess fifteen 2-fold, ten 3-fold and six 5-fold axes in accordance with their icosahedral symmetry.

Quasicrystals fall into three groups of different thermal stability:

- Stable quasicrystals grown by slow cooling or casting with subsequent annealing,
- Metastable quasicrystals prepared by melt spinning, and
- Metastable quasicrystals formed by the crystallization of the amorphous phase.

Except for the Al–Li–Cu system, all the stable quasicrystals are almost free of defects and disorder, as evidenced by X-ray and electron diffraction revealing peak widths as sharp as those of perfect crystals such as Si. Diffraction patterns exhibit fivefold, threefold, and twofold symmetries, and reflections are arranged quasiperiodically in three dimensions.

The origin of the stabilization mechanism is different for the stable and metastable quasicrystals. Nevertheless, there is a common feature observed in most quasicrystal-forming liquid alloys or their undercooled liquids: a local icosahedral order. The icosahedral order is in equilibrium in the liquid state for the stable quasicrystals, whereas the icosahedral order prevails in the undercooled liquid state for the metastable quasicrystals.

A nanoscale icosahedral phase was formed in Zr-, Cu- and Hf-based bulk metallic glasses alloyed with noble metals.

Most quasicrystals have ceramic-like properties including high thermal and electrical resistance, hardness and brittleness, resistance to corrosion, and non-stick properties. Many metallic quasicrystalline substances are impractical for most applications due to their thermal instability; the Al–Cu–Fe ternary system and the Al–Cu–Fe–Cr and Al–Co–Fe–Cr quaternary systems, thermally stable up to 700 °C, are notable exceptions.

The quasi-ordered droplet crystals could be formed under Dipolar forces in the Bose Einstein condensate. While the softcore Rydberg dressing interaction forms triangular droplet-crystals, adding a Gaussian peak to the plateau type interaction would form multiple roton unstable points in the Bogoliubov spectrum. Therefore, the excitation around the roton instabilities would grow exponentially and form multiple allowed lattice constants leading to quasi-ordered periodic droplet crystals.

=== Applications ===
Quasicrystalline substances have potential applications in several forms.

Metallic quasicrystalline coatings can be applied by thermal spraying or magnetron sputtering. A problem that must be resolved is the tendency for cracking due to the materials' extreme brittleness. The cracking could be suppressed by reducing sample dimensions or coating thickness. Recent studies show typically brittle quasicrystals can exhibit remarkable ductility of over 50% strains at room temperature and sub-micrometer scales (<500 nm).

An application was the use of low-friction Al–Cu–Fe–Cr quasicrystals as a coating for frying pans. Food did not stick to it as much as to stainless steel making the pan moderately non-stick and easy to clean; heat transfer and durability were better than PTFE non-stick cookware and the pan was free from perfluorooctanoic acid (PFOA); the surface was very hard, claimed to be ten times harder than stainless steel, and not harmed by metal utensils or cleaning in a dishwasher; and the pan could withstand temperatures of 1,000 °C (1,800 °F) without harm. However, after an initial introduction the pans were a chrome steel, probably because of the difficulty of controlling thin films of the quasicrystal.

The Nobel citation said that quasicrystals, while brittle, could reinforce steel "like armor". When Shechtman was asked about potential applications of quasicrystals he said that a precipitation-hardened stainless steel is produced that is strengthened by small quasicrystalline particles. It does not corrode and is extremely strong, suitable for razor blades and surgery instruments. The small quasicrystalline particles impede the motion of dislocation in the material.

Quasicrystals were also being used to develop heat insulation, LEDs, diesel engines, and new materials that convert heat to electricity. Shechtman suggested new applications taking advantage of the low coefficient of friction and the hardness of some quasicrystalline materials, for example embedding particles in plastic to make strong, hard-wearing, low-friction plastic gears. The low heat conductivity of some quasicrystals makes them good for heat insulating coatings. One of the special properties of quasicrystals is their smooth surface, which can be flat despite the irregular atomic structure.

Other potential applications include selective solar absorbers for power conversion, broad-wavelength reflectors, and bone repair and prostheses applications where biocompatibility, low friction and corrosion resistance are required. Magnetron sputtering can be readily applied to other stable quasicrystalline alloys such as Al–Pd–Mn.

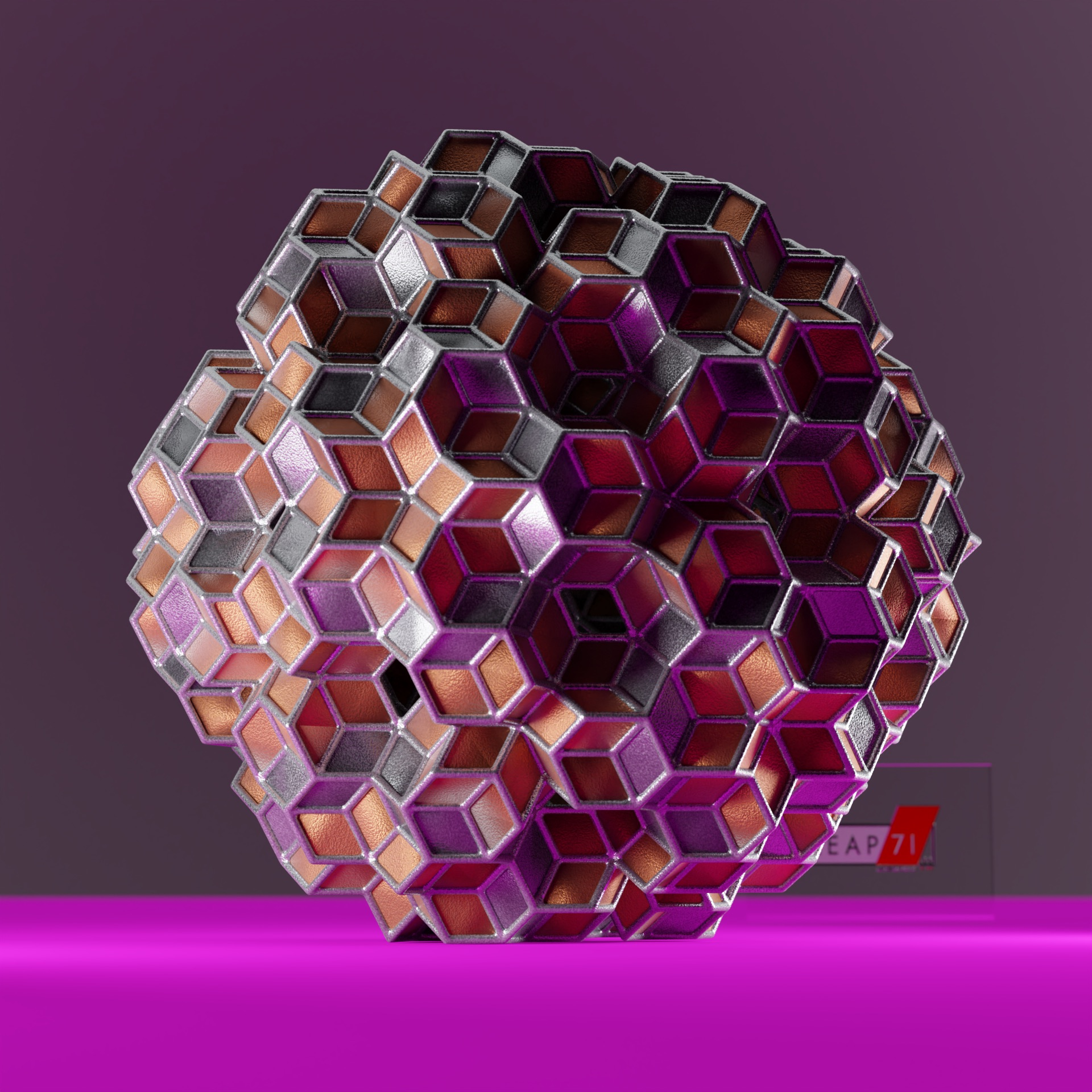
Rendering of a quasicrystalline structure, created using an open-source model for computational engineering

== Non-material science applications ==
Applications in macroscopic engineering have been suggested, building quasi-crystal-like large scale engineering structures, which could have interesting physical properties. Also, aperiodic tiling lattice structures may be used instead of isogrid or honeycomb patterns. The mechanical properties of honeycombs, based on a wide range of aperiodic tilings, have been investigated through simulation and physical testing of samples produced by 3D printing. The quasicrystal inspired honeycombs offer a broader range of mechanical properties than is available from commonly used honeycombs and are generally isotropic in the plane. Of particular note are honeycombs based on the aperiodic monotile, discovered by David Smith et al. These honeycombs offer planar isotropic zero Poisson's ratio, a rare elastic property that removes orthogonal deformation in response to an applied force. And, it has been shown that composite materials constructed of a hard matrix and a network of soft material mimicking the pattern of the aperiodic monotile can offer improved strength and toughness compared to similar composites using other patterns.

== See also ==
- Aperiodic crystal – Crystal type lacking 3D periodicity
- Archimedean solid – Polyhedra in which all vertices are the same
- Crystallography – Scientific study of crystal structures
- Disordered hyperuniformity – State similar to a liquid and a crystal
- Fibonacci quasicrystal – Binary sequence from Fibonacci recurrence
- Fiveling – Five crystals arranged around a common axis
- Icosahedral twins – Structure found in atomic clusters and nanoparticles
- Phason – Collective excitation in aperiodic materials
- Tessellation – Covering by shapes without overlaps or gaps
- Time crystal – Structure that repeats in time; a novel type or phase of non-equilibrium matter
