= List of fictional extraterrestrial species and races: W =

Name	Source	Type
Wadi	Star Trek	
Waldahudin	Robert J. Sawyer's Starplex	
Wanderers	Noon Universe	
Wang's Carpets	Greg Egan's Diaspora	
Wankh	Jack Vance's Planet of Adventure series	Black frog-like humanoids
Warren Ampersand	Adventure Time	A blue shapeshifting alien and one of Jake's biological parents.
The Watchers	Marvel Comics	An ancient race of extraterrestrials with a non-interference policy, thought to come from outside of the milky way.
Waterseekers	Red Planet	
Weeping Angels	Doctor Who	Quantum-locked, statue-like humanoid
Weevils	Torchwood	Humanoid
Whrloo	Larry Niven's Known Space	
Willis the Bouncer	Red Planet	
Winathians	DC Comics' Legion of Super-Heroes	Genetically modified humans from the planet Winath, who primarily have twin births.
Wirrn	Doctor Who	
Wisps	Sonic the Hedgehog	Squid-like creatures of various shapes and colors
Wogneer	Star Trek	
Wolfweeds	Doctor Who	
Wookiees	Star Wars	Large, forest-dwelling, furry humanoids
Wraith	Stargate	The wraith looks like a human, but with grey skin, long hair, and small holes in their face.
W'rkncacnter	Marathon Trilogy	
