= Wang tile =

Square tiles with a color on each edge

This set of 11 Wang tiles will tile the plane but only aperiodically.

Wang tiles (or Wang dominoes), first proposed by mathematician, logician, and philosopher Hao Wang in 1961, is a class of formal systems. They are modeled visually by square tiles with a color on each side. A set of such tiles is selected, and copies of the tiles are arranged side by side with matching colors, without rotating or reflecting them.

The basic question about a set of Wang tiles is whether it can tile the plane or not, i.e., whether an entire infinite plane can be filled this way. The next question is whether this can be done in a periodic pattern.

== Domino problem ==
Example of Wang tessellation with 13 tiles.

In 1961, Wang conjectured that if a finite set of Wang tiles can tile the plane, then there also exists a periodic tiling, which, mathematically, is a tiling that is invariant under translations by vectors in a 2-dimensional lattice. This can be likened to the periodic tiling in a wallpaper pattern, where the overall pattern is a repetition of some smaller pattern. He also observed that this conjecture would imply the existence of an algorithm to decide whether a given finite set of Wang tiles can tile the plane. The idea of constraining adjacent tiles to match each other occurs in the game of dominoes, so Wang tiles are also known as Wang dominoes. The algorithmic problem of determining whether a tile set can tile the plane became known as the domino problem.

According to Wang's student, Robert Berger,

The Domino Problem deals with the class of all domino sets. It consists of deciding, for each domino set, whether or not it is solvable. We say that the Domino Problem is decidable or undecidable according to whether there exists or does not exist an algorithm which, given the specifications of an arbitrary domino set, will decide whether or not the set is solvable.

In other words, the domino problem asks whether there is an effective procedure that correctly settles the problem for all given domino sets.

In 1966, Berger solved the domino problem in the negative. He proved that no algorithm for the problem can exist, by showing how to translate any Turing machine into a set of Wang tiles that tiles the plane if and only if the Turing machine does not halt. The undecidability of the halting problem (the problem of testing whether a Turing machine eventually halts) then implies the undecidability of Wang's tiling problem.

== Aperiodic sets of tiles ==
Wang tiles made monochromatic by replacing edges of each quadrant with a shape corresponding on its color – this set is isomorphic to Jeandel and Rao's minimal set above

Combining Berger's undecidability result with Wang's observation shows that there must exist a finite set of Wang tiles that tiles the plane, but only aperiodically. This is similar to a Penrose tiling, or the arrangement of atoms in a quasicrystal. Although Berger's original set contained 20,426 tiles, he conjectured that smaller sets would work, including subsets of his set, and in his unpublished Ph.D. thesis, he reduced the number of tiles to 104. In later years, ever smaller sets were found. For example, a set of 13 aperiodic tiles was published by Karel Culik II in 1996.

The smallest set of aperiodic tiles was discovered by Emmanuel Jeandel and Michael Rao in 2015, with 11 tiles and 4 colors. They used an exhaustive computer search to prove that 10 tiles or 3 colors are insufficient to force aperiodicity.

== Generalizations ==
Wang tiles can be generalized in various ways, all of which are also undecidable in the above sense. For example, Wang cubes are equal-sized cubes with colored faces, and side colors can be matched on any polygonal tessellation. Culik and Kari have demonstrated aperiodic sets of Wang cubes. Winfree et al. have demonstrated the feasibility of creating molecular "tiles" made from DNA (deoxyribonucleic acid) that can act as Wang tiles. Mittal et al. have shown that these tiles can also be composed of peptide nucleic acid (PNA), a stable artificial mimic of DNA.

== Applications ==
Wang tiles have been used for procedural generation of textures, heightfields, and other large and nonrepeating bi-dimensional data sets; a small set of precomputed or hand-made source tiles can be assembled very cheaply without too obvious repetitions and periodicity. In this case, traditional aperiodic tilings would show their very regular structure; much less constrained sets that guarantee at least two tile choices for any two given side colors are common because tileability is easily ensured and each tile can be selected pseudorandomly.

Wang tiles have also been used in cellular automata theory decidability proofs.

== In popular culture ==
The short story "Wang's Carpets", later expanded to the novel Diaspora, by Greg Egan, postulates a universe, complete with resident organisms and intelligent beings, embodied as Wang tiles implemented by patterns of complex molecules.

== See also ==
- Edge-matching puzzle
