= Substitution tiling =

Method for constructing tilings

In geometry, a tile substitution is a method for constructing highly ordered tilings. Most importantly, some tile substitutions generate aperiodic tilings, which are tilings whose prototiles do not admit any tiling with translational symmetry. The most famous of these are the Penrose tilings. Substitution tilings are special cases of finite subdivision rules, which do not require the tiles to be geometrically rigid.

== Introduction ==
A tile substitution is described by a set of prototiles (tile shapes) $T_1,T_2,\dots, T_m$, an expanding map $Q$ and a dissection rule showing how to dissect the expanded prototiles $Q T_i$ to form copies of some prototiles $T_j$. Intuitively, higher and higher iterations of tile substitution produce a tiling of the plane called a substitution tiling. Some substitution tilings are periodic, defined as having translational symmetry. Every substitution tiling (up to mild conditions) can be "enforced by matching rules"—that is, there exist a set of marked tiles that can only form exactly the substitution tilings generated by the system. The tilings by these marked tiles are necessarily aperiodic.

A simple example that produces a periodic tiling has only one prototile, namely a square:

By iterating this tile substitution, larger and larger regions of the plane are covered with a square grid. A more sophisticated example with two prototiles is shown below, with the two steps of blowing up and dissecting merged into one step.

One may intuitively get an idea how this procedure yields a substitution tiling of the entire plane. A mathematically rigorous definition is given below. Substitution tilings are notably useful as ways of defining aperiodic tilings, which are objects of interest in many fields of mathematics, including automata theory, combinatorics, discrete geometry, dynamical systems, group theory, harmonic analysis and number theory, as well as crystallography and chemistry. In particular, the celebrated Penrose tiling is an example of an aperiodic substitution tiling.

== History ==
In 1973 and 1974, Roger Penrose discovered a family of aperiodic tilings, now called Penrose tilings. The first description was given in terms of 'matching rules' treating the prototiles as jigsaw puzzle pieces. The proof that copies of these prototiles can be put together to form a tiling of the plane, but cannot do so periodically, uses a construction that can be cast as a substitution tiling of the prototiles. In 1977 Robert Ammann discovered a number of sets of aperiodic prototiles, i.e., prototiles with matching rules forcing nonperiodic tilings; in particular, he rediscovered Penrose's first example. This work gave an impact to scientists working in crystallography, eventually leading to the discovery of quasicrystals. In turn, the interest in quasicrystals led to the discovery of several well-ordered aperiodic tilings. Many of them can be easily described as substitution tilings.

== Mathematical definition ==
We will consider regions in ${\mathbb R}^d$ that are well-behaved, in the sense that a region is a nonempty compact subset that is the closure of its interior.

We take a set of regions $\mathbf{P} = \{ T_1, T_2,\dots, T_m \}$ as prototiles. A placement of a prototile $T_i$ is a pair $( T_i, \varphi )$ where $\varphi$ is an isometry of ${\mathbb R}^d$. The image $\varphi(T_i)$ is called the placement's region. A tiling T is a set of prototile placements whose regions have pairwise disjoint interiors. We say that the tiling T is a tiling of W where W is the union of the regions of the placements in T.

A tile substitution is often loosely defined in the literature. A precise definition is as follows.

A tile substitution with respect to the prototiles P is a pair $(Q, \sigma)$, where $Q: {\mathbb R}^d \to {\mathbb R}^d$ is a linear map, all of whose eigenvalues are larger than one in modulus, together with a substitution rule $\sigma$ that maps each $T_i$ to a tiling of $Q T_i$. The substitution rule $\sigma$ induces a map from any tiling T of a region W to a tiling $\sigma(\mathbf{T})$ of $Q_\sigma(\mathbf{W})$, defined by

$$\sigma(\mathbf{T}) = \bigcup_{(T_i,\varphi) \in \mathbf{T}} \{ ( T_j, Q \circ \varphi \circ Q^{-1} \circ \rho ) : (T_j, \rho) \in \sigma(T_i) \} .$$

Note, that the prototiles can be deduced from the tile substitution. Therefore it is not necessary to include them in the tile substitution $(Q,\sigma)$.

Every tiling of ${\mathbb R}^d$, where any finite part of it is congruent to a subset of some $\sigma^k(T_i)$ is called a substitution tiling (for the tile substitution $(Q, \sigma)$).

== See also ==
- Aperiodic tiling
- Domino tiling
- Pinwheel tiling
- Photographic mosaic
- Tübingen triangle
