= Wang's Carpets =

1995 short story by Greg Egan

- Short story by Greg Egan
- Country: Australia
- Language: English
- Genre: Science fiction

Publication
- Published in: New Legends
- Media type: Print
- Publication date: 5 April 1995

"Wang's Carpets" is a science-fiction short story by Australian writer Greg Egan, first published in New Legends edited by Greg Bear and Martin H. Greenberg on 5 April 1995.

It was later included in The Year's Best Science Fiction: Thirteenth Annual Collection in 1996 and Best of the Best: 20 Years of the Year's Best Science Fiction in 2005, both edited by Gardner Dozois, as well as The Mammoth Book of Extreme Science Fiction edited by Mike Ashley in 2006. The short story was also included in Egan's novel Diaspora (but minorly reworked). The title refers to the mathematician Wang Hao (or Hao Wang in western order).

== Plot ==
When the polis Carter-Zimmermann reaches the planet Orpheus in orbit around the star Vega, alien life is found in its oceans. An attempt for first contact fails, but micro probes sent down reveal their structure to be that of carpets made out of 20,000 unique polysaccharides. Closer inspection reveals, that the carpets are growing by adding new lines of polysaccharides and that they are resembling Wang tiles. According to a theorem by Hao Wang, any Turing machine can be described this way with new lines corresponding to new iterations of the calculation. A Fourier transformation uncovers that the carpets are simulating a sixteen-dimensional universe and squid-like aliens living within. Even though contacting them is impossible, the characters reflect that their waiting on aliens to communicate with and seeing these as isolated also applies the other way around.

== Reception ==
=== Reviews ===
Rich Horton, writing in the Locus Magazine, compares Egan's other short story "3-adica" to "Wang's Carpets" and calls the latter "one of his very best".

Greg Johnson, writing for the SF Site, states that "the references to 'Gleisner body' and 'physiological model', in the context of Egan's universe, are very revealing" and that "Egan's technical and scientific language works to a double purpose," since "it contributes to the story's worldbuilding and adds to characterization."

=== Awards ===
The short story was nominated for the Aurealis Award for Best Science Fiction Short Story in 1995. Egan's other short stories "Mister Volition" and "Luminous" were also nominated with the latter winning the award that year.
