= The Year's Best Science Fiction: Thirteenth Annual Collection =

1996 science fiction anthology edited by Gardner Dozois

- Editor: Gardner Dozois
- Language: English
- Series: The Year's Best Science Fiction
- Genre: Science fiction
- Publisher: St. Martin's Griffin
- Publication date: 1996 (collecting stories originally published in 1995)
- Publication place: United States
- Pages: 640 (586 of story text)
- ISBN: 9780312144517 (hardcover) ISBN 9780312144524 (trade paperback)
- OCLC: 34884302
- Preceded by: The Year's Best Science Fiction: Twelfth Annual Collection
- Followed by: The Year's Best Science Fiction: Fourteenth Annual Collection

The Year's Best Science Fiction: Thirteenth Annual Collection is a 1996 science fiction anthology edited by Gardner Dozois. It is the 13th in the Year's Best Science Fiction series. It won the Locus Award for best anthology.

== Contents ==
The book opens with a 39-page writeup by Dozois which summarizes and comments on major developments in science fiction literature and film in 1995. The main body of the book contains 24 stories (all originally published in 1995), an introduction by Dozois opening each story, and a 6-page referenced list of honorable mentions for the year. The stories included in the book are as follows.

- Ursula K. Le Guin: "A Woman's Liberation"
- Ian R. MacLeod: "Starship Day"
- Robert Reed: "A Place with Shade"
- Greg Egan: "Luminous"
- Michael F. Flynn: "The Promise of God"
- Pat Cadigan: "Death in the Promised Land"
- Joe Haldeman: "For White Hill"
- John Kessel: "Some Like It Cold"
- Allen Steele: "The Death of Captain Future"
- Maureen F. McHugh: "The Lincoln Train"
- David Marusek: "We Were Out of Our Minds with Joy"
- Michael Swanwick: "Radio Waves"
- Greg Egan: "Wang's Carpets"
- Mary Rosenblum: "Casting at Pegasus"
- Dan Simmons: "Looking for Kelly Dahl"
- James Patrick Kelly: "Think Like a Dinosaur"
- Ursula K. Le Guin: "Coming of Age in Karhide"
- Poul Anderson: "Genesis"
- Nancy Kress: "Feigenbaum Number"
- Geoff Ryman: "Home"
- Terry Bisson: "There Are No Dead"
- Paul J. McAuley: "Recording Angel"
- William Sanders: "Elvis Bearpaw's Luck"
- Brian Stableford: "Mortimer Gray's History of Death"

== Reception ==
Gideon Kibblewhite reviewed The Best New SF for Arcane magazine, rating it a 9 out of 10 overall, and stated that "Don't look for any spaceships, laser fighters or bug-eyed monsters, though - these writers aren't nearly as crass as that. Keep watching Star Wars if that's all you need to fire your imagination. Here you will find, instead, a multiverse which is far more strange, surreal and frightening. It's recommendation enough to say that you may find yourself still thinking about some of the ideas this anthology raises when the next edition comes around. Superior sci-fi."

== Reviews ==
- Review by Gary K. Wolfe (1996) in Locus, #425 June 1996
- Review by Neil Jones and Neil McIntosh (1997) in Interzone, January 1997
- Review by Don D'Ammassa (1997) in Science Fiction Chronicle, #192 June 1997
- Review by Liz Holliday (1997) in Valkyrie, Issue 14
