= Tübingen triangle =

Non-periodic tiling of the plane

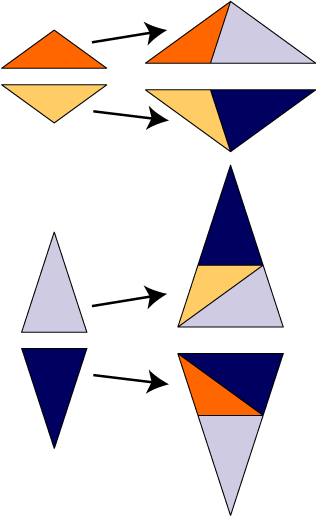
Tübingen triangle

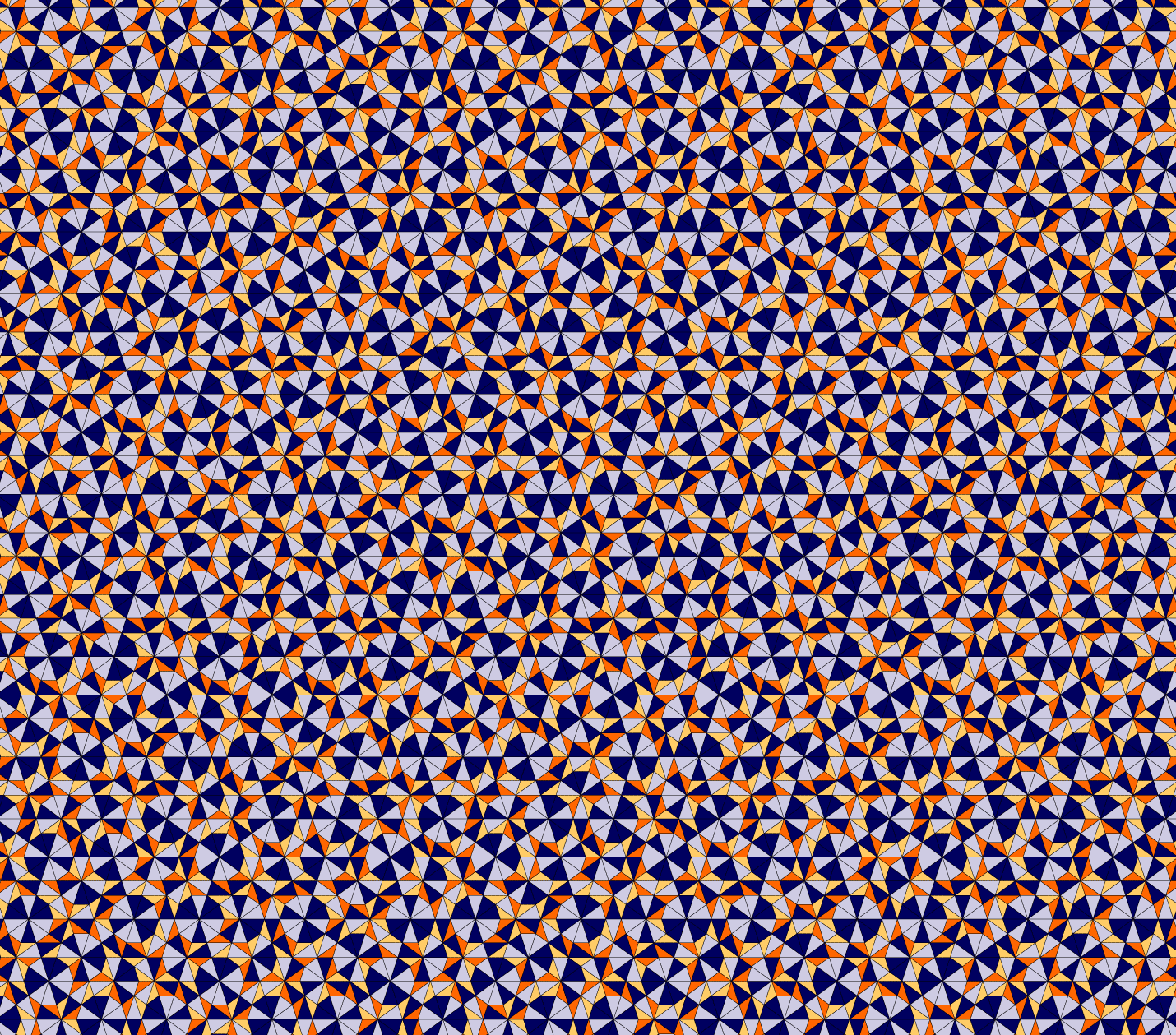
Tübingen triangles

The Tübingen triangle is a form of substitution tiling. It is, apart from the Penrose rhomb tilings and their variations, a classical candidate to model 5-fold (respectively 10-fold) quasicrystals. The inflation factor is – as in the Penrose case – the golden mean, $\varphi=\frac{a}{b} = \frac{1 + \sqrt{5}}{2} \approx 1.618.$

The prototiles are Robinson triangles, but the relationship is different: The Penrose rhomb tilings are locally derivable from the Tübingen triangle tilings.

These tilings were discovered and studied thoroughly by a group in Tübingen, Germany, thus the name. They can be obtained by cut-and-project on the 5-cell honeycomb.

Since the prototiles are mirror symmetric, but their substitutions are not, left-handed and right-handed tiles need to be distinguished. This is indicated by the colours in the substitution rule and the patches of the relevant figures.

== See also ==
- Mathematics and art
