= Extremal length =

In the mathematical theory of conformal and quasiconformal mappings, the extremal length of a collection of curves $\Gamma$ is a measure of the size of $\Gamma$ that is invariant under conformal mappings. More specifically, suppose that $D$ is an open set in the complex plane and $\Gamma$ is a collection of paths in $D$ and $f:D\to D'$ is a conformal mapping. Then the extremal length of $\Gamma$ is equal to the extremal length of the image of $\Gamma$ under $f$. One also works with the conformal modulus of $\Gamma$, the reciprocal of the extremal length. The fact that extremal length and conformal modulus are conformal invariants of $\Gamma$ makes them useful tools in the study of conformal and quasi-conformal mappings. One also works with extremal length in dimensions greater than two and certain other metric spaces, but the following deals primarily with the two dimensional setting.

== Definition of extremal length ==
To define extremal length, we need to first introduce several related quantities. Let $D$ be an open set in the complex plane. Suppose that $\Gamma$ is a collection of rectifiable curves in $D$. If $\rho:D\to [0,\infty]$ is Borel-measurable, then for any rectifiable curve $\gamma$ we let

$$L_\rho(\gamma):=\int_\gamma \rho\,|dz|$$

denote the $\rho$–length of $\gamma$, where $|dz|$ denotes the Euclidean element of length. (It is possible that $L_\rho(\gamma)=\infty$.) What does this really mean? If $\gamma:I\to D$ is parameterized in some interval $I$, then $\int_\gamma \rho\,|dz|$ is the integral of the Borel-measurable function $\rho(\gamma(t))$ with respect to the Borel measure on $I$ for which the measure of every subinterval $J\subset I$ is the length of the restriction of $\gamma$ to $J$. In other words, it is the Lebesgue-Stieltjes integral $\int_I \rho(\gamma(t))\,d{\mathrm{length}}_\gamma(t)$, where ${\mathrm{length}}_\gamma(t)$ is the length of the restriction of $\gamma$ to $\{s\in I:s\le t\}$. Also set

$$L_\rho(\Gamma):=\inf_{\gamma\in\Gamma}L_\rho(\gamma).$$

The area of $\rho$ is defined as

$$A(\rho):=\int_D \rho^2\,dx\,dy,$$

and the extremal length of $\Gamma$ is

$$EL(\Gamma):= \sup_\rho \frac{L_\rho(\Gamma)^2}{A(\rho)}\,,$$

where the supremum is over all Borel-measureable $\rho:D\to[0,\infty]$ with $0<A(\rho)<\infty$. If $\Gamma$ contains some non-rectifiable curves and $\Gamma_0$ denotes the set of rectifiable curves in $\Gamma$, then $EL(\Gamma)$ is defined to be $EL(\Gamma_0)$.

The term (conformal) modulus of $\Gamma$ refers to $1/EL(\Gamma)$.

The extremal distance in $D$ between two sets in $\overline D$ is the extremal length of the collection of curves in $D$ with one endpoint in one set and the other endpoint in the other set.

== Examples ==
In this section the extremal length is calculated in several examples. The first three of these examples are actually useful in applications of extremal length.

=== Extremal distance in rectangle ===
Fix some positive numbers $w,h>0$, and let $R$ be the rectangle $R=(0,w)\times(0,h)$. Let $\Gamma$ be the set of all finite length curves $\gamma:(0,1)\to R$ that cross the rectangle left to right, in the sense that $\lim_{t\to 0}\gamma(t)$ is on the left edge $\{0\}\times[0,h]$ of the rectangle, and $\lim_{t\to 1}\gamma(t)$ is on the right edge $\{w\}\times[0,h]$. (The limits necessarily exist, because we are assuming that $\gamma$ has finite length.) We will now prove that in this case

$$EL(\Gamma)=w/h$$

First, we may take $\rho=1$ on $R$. This $\rho$ gives $A(\rho)=w\,h$ and $L_\rho(\Gamma)=w$. The definition of $EL(\Gamma)$ as a supremum then gives $EL(\Gamma)\ge w/h$.

The opposite inequality is not quite so easy. Consider an arbitrary Borel-measurable $\rho:R\to[0,\infty]$ such that $\ell:=L_\rho(\Gamma)>0$. For $y\in(0,h)$, let $\gamma_y(t)=i\,y+w\,t$ (where we are identifying $\R^2$ with the complex plane). Then $\gamma_y\in\Gamma$, and hence $\ell\le L_\rho(\gamma_y)$. The latter inequality may be written as

$$\ell\le \int_0^1 \rho(i\,y+w\,t)\,w\,dt .$$

Integrating this inequality over $y\in(0,h)$ implies

$$h\,\ell\le \int_0^h\int_0^1\rho(i\,y+w\,t)\,w\,dt\,dy$$.

Now a change of variable $x=w\,t$ and an application of the Cauchy–Schwarz inequality give

$h\,\ell \le \int_0^h\int_0^w\rho(x+i\,y)\,dx\,dy \le \Bigl(\int_R \rho^2\,dx\,dy\int_R\,dx\,dy\Bigr)^{1/2} = \bigl(w\,h\,A(\rho)\bigr)^{1/2}$. This gives $\ell^2/A(\rho)\le w/h$.

Therefore, $EL(\Gamma)\le w/h$, as required.

As the proof shows, the extremal length of $\Gamma$ is the same as the extremal length of the much smaller collection of curves $\{\gamma_y:y\in(0,h)\}$.

It should be pointed out that the extremal length of the family of curves $\Gamma\,'$ that connect the bottom edge of $R$ to the top edge of $R$ satisfies $EL(\Gamma\,')=h/w$, by the same argument. Therefore, $EL(\Gamma)\,EL(\Gamma\,')=1$. It is natural to refer to this as a duality property of extremal length, and a similar duality property occurs in the context of the next subsection. Observe that obtaining a lower bound on $EL(\Gamma)$ is generally easier than obtaining an upper bound, since the lower bound involves choosing a reasonably good $\rho$ and estimating $L_\rho(\Gamma)^2/A(\rho)$, while the upper bound involves proving a statement about all possible $\rho$. For this reason, duality is often useful when it can be established: when we know that $EL(\Gamma)\,EL(\Gamma\,')=1$, a lower bound on $EL(\Gamma\,')$ translates to an upper bound on $EL(\Gamma)$.

=== Extremal distance in annulus ===
Let $r_1$ and $r_2$ be two radii satisfying $0<r_1<r_2<\infty$. Let $A$ be the annulus $A:=\{z\in\mathbb C:r_1<|z|<r_2\}$ and let $C_1$ and $C_2$ be the two boundary components of $A$: $C_1:=\{z:|z|=r_1\}$ and $C_2:=\{z:|z|=r_2\}$. Consider the extremal distance in $A$ between $C_1$ and $C_2$; which is the extremal length of the collection $\Gamma$ of curves $\gamma\subset A$ connecting $C_1$ and $C_2$.

To obtain a lower bound on $EL(\Gamma)$, we take $\rho(z)=1/|z|$. Then for $\gamma\in\Gamma$ oriented from $C_1$ to $C_2$

$$\int_\gamma |z|^{-1}\,ds \ge \int_\gamma |z|^{-1}\,d|z| = \int_\gamma d\log |z|=\log(r_2/r_1).$$

On the other hand,

$$A(\rho)=\int_A |z|^{-2}\,dx\,dy= \int_{0}^{2\pi}\int_{r_1}^{r_2} r^{-2}\,r\,dr\,d\theta = 2\,\pi \,\log(r_2/r_1).$$

We conclude that

$$EL(\Gamma)\ge \frac{\log(r_2/r_1)}{2\pi}.$$

We now see that this inequality is really an equality by employing an argument similar to the one given above for the rectangle. Consider an arbitrary Borel-measurable $\rho$ such that $\ell:=L_\rho(\Gamma)>0$. For $\theta\in[0,2\,\pi)$ let $\gamma_\theta:(r_1,r_2)\to A$ denote the curve $\gamma_\theta(r)=e^{i\theta}r$. Then

$$\ell\le\int_{\gamma_\theta}\rho\,ds =\int_{r_1}^{r_2}\rho(e^{i\theta}r)\,dr.$$

We integrate over $\theta$ and apply the Cauchy-Schwarz inequality, to obtain:

$$2\,\pi\,\ell \le \int_A \rho\,dr\,d\theta \le \Bigl(\int_A \rho^2\,r\,dr\,d\theta \Bigr)^{1/2}\Bigl(\int_0^{2\pi}\int_{r_1}^{r_2} \frac 1 r\,dr\,d\theta\Bigr)^{1/2}.$$

Squaring gives

$$4\,\pi^2\,\ell^2\le A(\rho)\cdot\,2\,\pi\,\log(r_2/r_1).$$

This implies the upper bound $EL(\Gamma)\le (2\,\pi)^{-1}\,\log(r_2/r_1)$. When combined with the lower bound, this yields the exact value of the extremal length:

$$EL(\Gamma)=\frac{\log(r_2/r_1)}{2\pi}.$$

=== Extremal length around an annulus ===
Let $r_1,r_2,C_1,C_2,\Gamma$ and $A$ be as above, but now let $\Gamma^*$ be the collection of all curves that wind once around the annulus, separating $C_1$ from $C_2$. Using the above methods, it is not hard to show that

$$EL(\Gamma^*)=\frac{2\pi}{\log(r_2/r_1)}=EL(\Gamma)^{-1}.$$

This illustrates another instance of extremal length duality.

=== Extremal length of topologically essential paths in projective plane ===
In the above examples, the extremal $\rho$ which maximized the ratio $L_\rho(\Gamma)^2/A(\rho)$ and gave the extremal length corresponded to a flat metric. In other words, when the Euclidean Riemannian metric of the corresponding planar domain is scaled by $\rho$, the resulting metric is flat. In the case of the rectangle, this was just the original metric, but for the annulus, the extremal metric identified is the metric of a cylinder. We now discuss an example where an extremal metric is not flat. The projective plane with the spherical metric is obtained by identifying antipodal points on the unit sphere in $\R^3$ with its Riemannian spherical metric. In other words, this is the quotient of the sphere by the map $x\mapsto -x$. Let $\Gamma$ denote the set of closed curves in this projective plane that are not null-homotopic. (Each curve in $\Gamma$ is obtained by projecting a curve on the sphere from a point to its antipode.) Then the spherical metric is extremal for this curve family. (The definition of extremal length readily extends to Riemannian surfaces.) Thus, the extremal length is $\pi^2/(2\,\pi)=\pi/2$.

=== Extremal length of paths containing a point ===
If $\Gamma$ is any collection of paths all of which have positive diameter and containing a point $z_0$, then $EL(\Gamma)=\infty$. This follows, for example, by taking

$$\rho(z):= \begin{cases}(-|z-z_0|\,\log |z-z_0|)^{-1} & |z-z_0|<1/2,\\
0 & |z-z_0|\ge 1/2,\end{cases}$$
which satisfies $A(\rho)<\infty$ and $L_\rho(\gamma)=\infty$ for every rectifiable $\gamma\in\Gamma$.

== Elementary properties of extremal length ==
The extremal length satisfies a few simple monotonicity properties. First, it is clear that if $\Gamma_1\subset\Gamma_2$, then $EL(\Gamma_1)\ge EL(\Gamma_2)$. Moreover, the same conclusion holds if every curve $\gamma_1\in\Gamma_1$ contains a curve $\gamma_2\in \Gamma_2$ as a subcurve (that is, $\gamma_2$ is the restriction of $\gamma_1$ to a subinterval of its domain). Another sometimes useful inequality is

$$EL(\Gamma_1\cup\Gamma_2)\ge \bigl(EL(\Gamma_1)^{-1}+EL(\Gamma_2)^{-1}\bigr)^{-1}.$$

This is clear if $EL(\Gamma_1)=0$ or if $EL(\Gamma_2)=0$, in which case the right hand side is interpreted as $0$. So suppose that this is not the case and with no loss of generality assume that the curves in $\Gamma_1\cup\Gamma_2$ are all rectifiable. Let $\rho_1,\rho_2$ satisfy $L_{\rho_j}(\Gamma_j)\ge 1$ for $j=1,2$. Set $\rho=\max\{\rho_1,\rho_2\}$. Then $L_\rho(\Gamma_1\cup\Gamma_2)\ge 1$ and $A(\rho)=\int\rho^2\,dx\,dy\le\int(\rho_1^2+\rho_2^2)\,dx\,dy=A(\rho_1)+A(\rho_2)$, which proves the inequality.

== Conformal invariance of extremal length ==
Let $f:D\to D^*$ be a conformal homeomorphism (a bijective holomorphic map) between planar domains. Suppose that $\Gamma$ is a collection of curves in $D$, and let $\Gamma^*:=\{f\circ \gamma:\gamma\in\Gamma\}$ denote the image curves under $f$. Then $EL(\Gamma)=EL(\Gamma^*)$. This conformal invariance statement is the primary reason why the concept of extremal length is useful.

Here is a proof of conformal invariance. Let $\Gamma_0$ denote the set of curves $\gamma\in\Gamma$ such that $f\circ \gamma$ is rectifiable, and let $\Gamma_0^*=\{f\circ\gamma:\gamma\in\Gamma_0\}$, which is the set of rectifiable curves in $\Gamma^*$. Suppose that $\rho^*:D^*\to[0,\infty]$ is Borel-measurable. Define

$$\rho(z)=|f\,'(z)|\,\rho^*\bigl(f(z)\bigr).$$

A change of variables $w=f(z)$ gives

$$A(\rho)=\int_D \rho(z)^2\,dz\,d\bar z=\int_D \rho^*(f(z))^2\,|f\,'(z)|^2\,dz\,d\bar z = \int_{D^*} \rho^*(w)^2\,dw\,d\bar w=A(\rho^*).$$

Now suppose that $\gamma\in \Gamma_0$ is rectifiable, and set $\gamma^*:=f\circ\gamma$. Formally, we may use a change of variables again:

$$L_\rho(\gamma)=\int_\gamma \rho^*\bigl(f(z)\bigr)\,|f\,'(z)|\,|dz| = \int_{\gamma^*} \rho(w)\,|dw|=L_{\rho^*}(\gamma^*).$$

To justify this formal calculation, suppose that $\gamma$ is defined in some interval $I$, let $\ell(t)$ denote the length of the restriction of $\gamma$ to $I\cap(-\infty,t]$, and let $\ell^*(t)$ be similarly defined with $\gamma^*$ in place of $\gamma$. Then it is easy to see that $d\ell^*(t)=|f\,'(\gamma(t))|\,d\ell(t)$, and this implies $L_\rho(\gamma)=L_{\rho^*}(\gamma^*)$, as required. The above equalities give,

$$EL(\Gamma_0)\ge EL(\Gamma_0^*)=EL(\Gamma^*).$$

If we knew that each curve in $\Gamma$ and $\Gamma^*$ was rectifiable, this would prove $EL(\Gamma)=EL(\Gamma^*)$ since we may also apply the above with $f$ replaced by its inverse and $\Gamma$ interchanged with $\Gamma^*$. It remains to handle the non-rectifiable curves.

Now let $\hat\Gamma$ denote the set of rectifiable curves $\gamma\in\Gamma$ such that $f\circ\gamma$ is non-rectifiable. We claim that $EL(\hat\Gamma)=\infty$. Indeed, take $\rho(z)=|f\,'(z)|\,h(|f(z)|)$, where $h(r)=\bigl(r\,\log (r+2)\bigr)^{-1}$. Then a change of variable as above gives

$$A(\rho)= \int_{D^*} h(|w|)^2\,dw\,d\bar w \le \int_0^{2\pi}\int_0^\infty (r\,\log (r+2))^{-2} \,r\,dr\,d\theta<\infty.$$

For $\gamma\in\hat\Gamma$ and $r\in(0,\infty)$ such that $f\circ \gamma$ is contained in $\{z:|z|<r\}$, we have

$L_\rho(\gamma)\ge\inf\{h(s):s\in[0,r]\}\,\mathrm{length}(f\circ\gamma)=\infty$.

On the other hand, suppose that $\gamma\in\hat\Gamma$ is such that $f\circ\gamma$ is unbounded. Set $H(t):=\int_0^t h(s)\,ds$. Then $L_\rho(\gamma)$ is at least the length of the curve $t\mapsto H(|f\circ \gamma(t)|)$ (from an interval in $\R$ to $\R$). Since $\lim_{t\to\infty}H(t)=\infty$, it follows that $L_\rho(\gamma)=\infty$. Thus, indeed, $EL(\hat\Gamma)=\infty$.

Using the results of the previous section, we have

$$EL(\Gamma)=EL(\Gamma_0\cup\hat\Gamma)\ge EL(\Gamma_0)$$.

We have already seen that $EL(\Gamma_0)\ge EL(\Gamma^*)$. Thus, $EL(\Gamma)\ge EL(\Gamma^*)$. The reverse inequality holds by symmetry, and conformal invariance is therefore established.

== Some applications of extremal length ==
By the calculation of the extremal distance in an annulus and the conformal invariance it follows that the annulus $\{z:r<|z|<R\}$ (where $0\le r<R\le\infty$) is not conformally homeomorphic to the annulus $\{w:r^*<|w|<R^*\}$ if $\frac Rr\ne \frac{R^*}{r^*}$.

== Extremal length in higher dimensions ==
The notion of extremal length adapts to the study of various problems in dimensions 3 and higher, especially in relation to quasiconformal mappings.

== Discrete extremal length ==
Suppose that $G=(V,E)$ is some graph and $\Gamma$ is a collection of paths in $G$. There are two variants of extremal length in this setting. To define the edge extremal length, originally introduced by R. J. Duffin, consider a function $\rho:E\to[0,\infty)$. The $\rho$-length of a path is defined as the sum of $\rho(e)$ over all edges in the path, counted with multiplicity. The "area" $A(\rho)$ is defined as $\sum_{e\in E}\rho(e)^2$. The extremal length of $\Gamma$ is then defined as before. If $G$ is interpreted as a resistor network, where each edge has unit resistance, then the effective resistance between two sets of vertices is precisely the edge extremal length of the collection of paths with one endpoint in one set and the other endpoint in the other set. Thus, discrete extremal length is useful for estimates in discrete potential theory.

Another notion of discrete extremal length that is appropriate in other contexts is vertex extremal length, where $\rho:V\to[0,\infty)$, the area is $A(\rho):=\sum_{v\in V}\rho(v)^2$, and the length of a path is the sum of $\rho(v)$ over the vertices visited by the path, with multiplicity.
