= Robert Berger (mathematician) =

American mathematician (born 1938)

Robert Berger (born 1938) is an applied mathematician, known for discovering the first aperiodic tiling using a set of 20,426 distinct tile shapes.

== Contributions to tiling theory ==
The unexpected existence of aperiodic tilings, although not Berger's explicit construction of them, follows from another result proved by Berger: that the so-called domino problem is undecidable, disproving a conjecture of Hao Wang, Berger's advisor. The result is analogous to a 1962 construction used by Kahr, Moore, and Wang, to show that a more constrained version of the domino problem was undecidable.

== Education and career ==
Berger did his undergraduate studies at Rensselaer Polytechnic Institute, and studied applied physics at Harvard, earning a master's degree, before shifting to applied mathematics for his doctorate. Along with Hao Wang, Berger's other two doctoral committee members were Patrick Carl Fischer and Marvin Minsky. Later, he has worked in the Digital Integrated Circuits Group of the Lincoln Laboratory.

== Publications ==
Berger's work on tiling was published as "The Undecidability of the Domino Problem" in the Memoirs of the AMS in 1966. This paper is essentially a reprint of Berger's 1964 dissertation at Harvard University.

In 2009, a paper by Berger and other Lincoln Laboratories researchers, "Wafer-scale 3D integration of InGaAs image sensors with Si readout circuits", won the best paper award at the IEEE International 3D System Integration Conference (3DIC). In 2010, a CMOS infrared imaging device with an analog-to-digital converter in each pixel, coinvented by Berger, was one of R&D Magazine's R&D 100 Award recipients.
