= Diaspora (novel) =

1997 novel by Greg Egan

- First edition
- Author: Greg Egan
- Language: English
- Genre: Hard science fiction
- Publisher: Millennium
- Publication date: September 1997
- Publication place: Australia
- Media type: Print (paperback)
- Pages: 376 (PB edition)
- ISBN: 0-7528-0925-3
- OCLC: 39837889

Diaspora is a hard science fiction novel by the Australian writer Greg Egan which first appeared in print in 1997. It originated as the short story "Wang's Carpets" which originally appeared in the Greg Bear-edited anthology New Legends (Legend, London, 1995). The story appears as a chapter of the novel.

== Setting and premise ==
An appended glossary explains many of the specialist terms in the novel. Egan invents several new theories of physics, beginning with Kozuch Theory, the dominant physics paradigm for nearly nine hundred years before the beginning of the novel. Kozuch Theory treats elementary particles as semi-point-like wormholes, whose properties can be explained entirely in terms of their geometries in six dimensions. Certain assumptions common to Egan's works inform the plot.

This novel's setting is a posthuman future, in which transhumanism long ago (during the mid 21st century) became the default philosophy embraced by the vast majority of human cultures.

Most of the characters choose a neutral gender; Keri Hulme's gender-neutral pronouns "ve", "vis", and "ver" are used for them.

By 2975 CE (Universal Time), the year in which the novel begins, humanity has "speciated" into three distinct groupings:

- fleshers, biological societies consisting of statics, the original, naturally-evolving race of Homo sapiens, and a wide variety of exuberant derivatives, who have modified their genes beyond the static baseline. These include enhancements such as disease resistance, life extension, intelligence amplification, and the ability to allow selected transhumans to thrive in new environments, such as the sea. There even exists a subculture (the dream apes) whose ancestors bred out the capacity for speech and some of the higher brain-functions, apparently in order to attain a primal innocence and rapport with nature. In contrast to 21st-century society prior to the novel's "Introdus" event, the vast profusion of qualitatively different types of fleshers has made any sort of global civilisation impossible. This divergence has prompted the development of a culture of "Bridgers" who modify their own minds to form a chain of intermediates between exuberant strains.
- gleisner robots, individual software-based intelligences housed inside artificial anthropoid, or flesher-shaped, physical bodies (from a design by a corporation named Gleisner) who interact with the world in flesher-paced "real time", a trait which they regard as important, as they consider the polis citizens too remote and solipsistic. The gleisners live in space, mostly in the asteroid belt, and in various other places in the Solar System; Egan implies that they long ago agreed to leave Earth to the fleshers to avoid conflict. They eventually implement a program of interstellar exploration using a fleet of 63 ships, targeting the nearest 21 stars.
- the citizens, intelligence as disembodied computer software running entirely within simulated reality-based communities known as polises. These represent the majority by far of "humanity" in the novel, followed in a distant second place by the gleisners. Together with vast networks of sensors, probes, drones and satellites throughout the Solar system, they collectively make up the Coalition of Polises, the backbone and bulk of human civilisation. They interact primarily in virtual environments called scapes, through the use of avatars or icons. The citizens of the Coalition view the gleisners and their colonial aspirations as puerile and ultimately futile, believing that only "bacteria with spaceships. . . knowing no better and having no choice" would attempt to deface the galaxy with mass colonisation, especially if virtual realities afford limitless possibilities at a small fraction of the total resource-consumption.

Diaspora focuses in large part on the nature of life and intelligence in a post-human context, and questions the meaning of life and the meaning of desires. If, for instance, the meaning of human life and human desires is bound up with ancestral human biology ("to spread one's genes"), then what meaning do lives and desires have, and what serves as the basis of values when biology no longer forms a part of life?

== Plot summary ==
Diaspora begins with a description of "orphanogenesis", the birthing of a citizen without any ancestors (the majority of citizens either descend from fleshers uploaded at some point or are the product of one or many parents who "custom-order" descendants with some combination of their traits), and the subsequent upbringing of the newborn Yatima within Konishi polis. Yatima's development is closely monitored for abnormalities by the conceptory, before Yatima attains self-awareness and is subsequently given full rights as a citizen of Konishi. Yatima matures within a few real-time days, because citizens' subjective time runs about 800 times as rapidly as flesher and gleisner time. Early on, Yatima and a friend, Inoshiro, use abandoned gleisner bodies to visit a Bridger colony near the ruins of Atlanta on Earth.

Years later, the gleisner Karpal, using a gravitational-wave detector, determines that a binary neutron star system in the constellation of Lacerta has collapsed, releasing a huge burst of energy. Previous predictions portrayed the system's stable orbit as likely to last for another seven million years. By analysing irregularities in the orbit, Karpal discovers that the devastating burst of energy will reach Earth within the next four days. Yatima and Inoshiro return to Earth to urge the fleshers—gathered in a conference—either to migrate to the polises or at least to shelter themselves. Many fleshers reject this advice, or fail to fully appreciate its urgency quickly enough. Stirred up by a paranoid Static diplomat, many fleshers suspect that Yatima and Inoshiro have come to trick or coerce them into "Introdus", or mass-migration into the polises, involving masses of virus-sized nanomachines that dismantle a human body and record the brain's information states as it is chemically converted into a crystalline computer. The gamma ray burst reaches Earth shortly after the conference, destroying the atmosphere and causing a mass extinction. The gleisners and the Coalition of Polises survive the burst, thanks to cosmic radiation hardening. Over the next few years, Yatima and other citizens and gleisners attempt to rescue any surviving fleshers from slow suffocation, starvation, or poisoning by offering to upload them into the polises.

The novel's title itself refers to a quest undertaken by most of the inhabitants of Carter-Zimmerman ("C-Z"), a polis devoted to physics and understanding the cosmos, along with volunteers from throughout the Coalition of Polises. The Diaspora consists of a collection of one thousand clones (physical copies of the polis hardware) of C-Z polis, deployed toward stars in all directions in the hope of gathering as much data as possible in order to revise the long-held classical understanding of Kozuch Theory, which had failed to predict the Lacerta event. The bulk of the novel follows this expedition, rotating back and forth between different cloned instances of the same cast of main characters as different C-Z clones make discoveries along the way, relaying information to one another over hundreds of light years—and finally between several universes.

== Characters ==
- Yatima appears as an Orphan, a personality formed by the Konishi polis conceptory rather than by a parent or parents. A central character in the novel, ve usually takes the iconic form of an African herdsman in a purple robe. Yatima exhibits a deep love of mathematics and a desire to explore the unknown.
- Blanca also inhabits the Konishi polis, and is one of the first three people that Yatima meets. Ve is a physicist and scape-architect, acknowledged throughout the Coalition of Polises as an expert on Kozuch Theory. Vis usual icon is a featureless black silhouette.
- Inoshiro, another of Yatima's earliest friends, is a native of Konishi but a frequent visitor to Ashton-Laval, a polis of great artistic merit. Ve proudly considers verself delinquent. Inoshiro frequently attempts to attract Yatima away from philosophical Konishi and into more aesthetic and avant-garde pursuits. Inoshiro originates the idea of visiting the fleshers of Atlanta in ancient gleisner bodies. Later, traumatized by the deaths of most of the fleshers in the Lacerta Event, ve adopts a new outlook (a preprogrammed set of self-reinforcing beliefs installed directly into a citizen’s mind) that makes ver no longer care about the physical world. Yatima discovers this and attempts to convince Inoshiro to accompany ver in emigrating to Carter-Zimmerman polis where tangible bodies are the norm, but this outlook has made Inoshiro unwilling to do so. Before and after the Lacerta Event, vis icon has "pewter-grey" metallic skin.
- Gabriel, Yatima's third early friend, is Blanca's lover and another great physicist. He differs from most polis citizens in having chosen for himself a specific (though non-functional) gender, a trait considered eccentric and perhaps perverted by many citizens of the Coalition. His icon is covered in short golden-brown fur.
- Karpal, a gleisner astronomer who lives on the surface of the Moon, first discovers the collapse of Lac G-1 in Lacerta. He later leaves his robotic body and gleisner society to transmigrate to the Carter-Zimmerman polis, seeking a more profound understanding of physics, unavailable to creatures whose minds remain programmed to think of things in terms of their bodies.
- Orlando Venetti is originally a leader of the Bridger colony of Atlanta; he and his mate Liana Zabini first welcome Inoshiro and Yatima upon their arrival in gleisner form. In the Lacerta Event, Liana dies but the visitors from Konishi rescue Orlando and bring him into the polis. He joins the Diaspora and, thanks to his Bridger training, he makes the first interactive contact with an alien intelligence. Before joining the Diaspora he creates a son, Paolo, who ultimately joins Yatima in exploring higher-dimensional spacetime on the trail of the "Transmuters".
- Radiya is Yatima's first mentor in abstract mathematics and in exploration of the "Truth Mines", Konishi’s metaphoric representation of the world of mathematical theorems. Vis icon is a fleshless skeleton made of twigs and branches, with a skull carved from a knotted stump.
- Hermann is a member of the original 21st-century Introdus, who joins the Diaspora. Ve describes verself as vis own great-great-grandchild because ve has reinvented vis own personality so many times during vis long life. Vis eccentricity is reflected in vis icon, a segmented worm with six flesher-shaped feet attached to elbow-jointed legs, based on the curl-up from the work of M. C. Escher.
- The Star Puppies, a group of Carter-Zimmerman citizens, elect to stay conscious, in real time, for the duration of their spaceflight in the Diaspora (most others enter a state of suspension). The Puppies take the form of space-evolved creatures dwelling in a scape representing the hull of the spacecraft, employing personality outlooks (software which accentuates specific moods and values) to ensure they feel constant joy in, and at, the universe around them and retain their sanity.

== The polises ==
Humanity began transferring itself into the polises (the Introdus) in the late 21st century UT, when the technology became feasible to effect the nanoscale transmutation of human brains into functionally indistinguishable molecular computer systems.

Many polises exist, though the novel mentions only a few. Though their physical infrastructure is not described, they apparently are hardware-based supercomputers of varying size (one of the full C-Z polis clones is briefly mentioned as roughly ten centimeters long) and unknown computational ability, all probably hidden in safe places. Konishi polis, at least, lies buried deep beneath the Siberian tundra, and is multiply backed up throughout the solar system.

Each polis has a distinct character, encapsulated in a "charter" which defines its goals, philosophies, and attitudes to other polises and to the external world. Citizens are expected to heed the charter of the polis they "live" in; should they begin to disagree with the charter, they can always migrate to a polis which appears more amenable to them.

The most prominent differences between the various polises, at least in the novel, involve their attitudes toward the physical world. Polis societies range from those who wish to experience the real world of normal time and space to the wholly solipsistic who live their entire lives in esoteric, isolated virtuality.

The citizens of Konishi polis seem to concern themselves mostly with abstract mathematics and esoteric philosophical pursuits, and generally show little interest in the physical world. They use visual icons for social purposes, but regard simulated physical interaction as a violation of individual autonomy.

After the Lacerta Event, Yatima emigrates from Konishi to Carter-Zimmerman polis, which rejects the solipsism exemplified by Konishi and embraces the study of the physical universe as of paramount importance. Given the Lacerta Event, which suggests that the universe has the capability of unleashing unknown extreme dangers, Yatima has begun to share this viewpoint.

== Polis time, delta, and perception ==
For internal dating and time standards the polises use CST (Coalition Standard Time), measured in tau elapsed since the adoption of the system on January 1, 2065 (UT). The novel begins at CST date 23 387 025 000 000. CST defines one tau as the amount of time in which a polis citizen can experience the passage of one second of subjective time; this elastic value changes with improvements in polis hardware. In the period of the novel a polis citizen's mind can operate at a maximum speed of about 800 times that of a flesher's mind, so 1 tau equals approximately 1.25 millisecond. By the beginning of the novel, the Coalition of Polises has existed for over 741 subjective millennia (during 910 years of flesher time), of which about 98.3% has occurred since the last major Coalition-wide polis hardware upgrade in UT 2750.

Nothing compels citizens to experience time at such a high rate; they can equally choose to "rush", meaning to experience consciousness at a speed slower than the maximum the polis hardware can maintain. Citizens can therefore experience consciousness at the same speed as a human flesher would, or slower, or even freeze their conscious state for a set time or until a previously determined event occurs. Citizens in Lokhande Polis have opted to experience consciousness so slowly that they can witness continental drift and geological erosion.

The polises measure distance, an arbitrary value within their virtual scapes, in "delta", which Egan does not fully explain, although the glossary indicates that citizens' icons are generally about 2 delta high, implying that one delta represents (roughly) one meter. Delta may also be fractionalised, and there is no largest or smallest distance as defined in delta.

Almost all polis citizens, except for those who specifically elect otherwise, experience the world through two sensory modalities: Linear and Gestalt, which Egan describes as distant descendants of hearing and seeing, respectively. Linear conveys information quantitatively, as a string or strings of information formulated with a language hardwired into the mind of almost all Citizens. Citizens may "speak" to one another in Linear by sending streams of data back and forth, from mind to mind — either private conversations carried on between a specific subset of intended participants, or public announcements accessible to all involved in a conversation or otherwise "listening in".

Gestalt conveys information qualitatively, and data sent or received about anything arrives all at once for interpretation by the mind of the Citizen in all its aspects simultaneously, resulting in an experience of immediacy. A citizen need not consciously consider the information sent (as in Linear): Gestalt operates rather entirely or almost entirely subconsciously. Citizens use Gestalt to create icons for themselves — "visual" representations within Scapes (Gestalt "areas" or "spaces"). Citizens also use Gestalt to convey Tags: packages of information described as like an odour or essence, which any other Citizens within a range of several delta (or who happen to "read" for specific Tags) can gather. Each Citizen has a unique Tag which identifies them as a particular person, regardless of their other appearances, and citizens may emit Tags for other purposes as well, as when Citizens need to convey and understand arbitrary information instantly. Early in the novel, for instance, Yatima learns about an asteroid in the real world by reading its tags subconsciously, which precisely inform ver about its properties such as mass, velocity, rotation, composition, emission spectra, and other such data discernible to the Coalition's satellite network. Later on Earth, however, when ve and Inoshiro inhabit derelict Gleisner bodies, Yatima must remind verself that Fleshers are real people, even though they lack tags identifying themselves as such.

== See also ==
- Permutation City
- Simulated reality
- "The Planck Dive"
