= Hao Wang (academic) =

Chinese-American professor (1921–1995)

- Wang in 1980
- Born: 20 May 1921; Jinan, Shandong, China
- Died: 13 May 1995 (aged 73); New York City, U.S.
- Education: National Southwestern Associated University (BS); Tsinghua University (MA); Harvard University (PhD)
- Known for: Wang tiles Wang B-machine
- Scientific career
- Fields: Mathematics; Philosophy; Computer science
- Workplaces: Harvard University; University of Oxford; Rockefeller University
- Doctoral advisor: Willard Van Orman Quine
- Other academic advisors: Paul Bernays
- Doctoral students: Stephen Cook; Shimon Even; Joyce Friedman
- Other notable students: Aaron Sloman

Hao Wang (Chinese: 王浩; pinyin: Wáng Hào; 20 May 1921 – 13 May 1995) was a Chinese-American logician, philosopher, mathematician, and commentator on Kurt Gödel.

== Biography ==
Born in Jinan, Shandong, in the Republic of China (today in the People's Republic of China), Wang received his early education in China. He obtained a B.S. degree in mathematics from the National Southwestern Associated University in 1943 and an M.A. in philosophy from Tsinghua University in 1945, where his teachers included Feng Youlan and Jin Yuelin, after which he moved to the United States for further graduate studies. He studied logic under W. V. O. Quine at Harvard University, culminating in a Ph.D. in 1948. He was appointed to an assistant professorship at Harvard the same year.

During the early 1950s, Wang studied with Paul Bernays in Zürich. In 1956, he was appointed Reader in the Philosophy of Mathematics at the University of Oxford. In 1959, Wang wrote on an IBM 704 computer a program that in only 9 minutes mechanically proved several hundred mathematical logic theorems in Whitehead and Russell's Principia Mathematica. In 1961, he was appointed Gordon McKay Professor of Mathematical Logic and Applied Mathematics at Harvard. From 1967 until 1991, he headed the logic research group at Rockefeller University in New York City, where he was professor of logic. In 1972, Wang joined in a group of Chinese American scientists led by Chih-Kung Jen as the first such delegation from the U.S. to the People's Republic of China.

In the 1950s, Hao's work used Marxism and Western analytical philosophy to critique the then-prevailing view of cognitive processes as mechanical computation. Hao contended instead that human reason is not influenced by universal rules, but rather is personal and influenced by historical and material conditions.

One of Wang's most important contributions was the Wang tile. He showed that any Turing machine can be turned into a set of Wang tiles. The domino problem is to find an algorithm that uses a set of Wang tiles to tile the plane. The first noted example of aperiodic tiling is a set of Wang tiles, whose nonexistence Wang had once conjectured, discovered by his student Robert Berger in 1966. Wang also had a significant influence on theory of computational complexity.

A philosopher in his own right, Wang also developed a penetrating interpretation of Ludwig Wittgenstein's later philosophy of mathematics, which he called "anthropologism." Later he broadened this reading in the foundations of mathematics. He chronicled Kurt Gödel's philosophical ideas and authored several books on the subject, thereby providing contemporary scholars many insights elucidating Gödel's later philosophical thought. He saw his own philosophy of "substantial factualism" as a middle ground that includes both abstract theoretical formulations and the ordinary language of everyday discourse.

In 1983 he was presented with the first Milestone Prize for Automated Theorem-Proving, sponsored by the International Joint Conference on Artificial Intelligence.

On 13 May 1995, Wang died at New York Hospital one week from his 74th birthday. According to his wife Hanne Tierney, Wang's cause of death was from lymphoma. In addition to Tierney, Wang was survived by a daughter and two sons.

== Books ==
- Les Systèmes axiomatiques de la Théorie des Ensembles, Gauthier-Villars; Paris, 1953. [Wang 1953a, with Robert McNaughton].
- A Survey of Mathematical Logic. Peking: Science Press; Amsterdam: North-Holland, 1962. [Wang 1962a].
- From Mathematics to Philosophy. London: Routledge & Kegan Paul, 1974. [Wang 1974a].
- Popular Lectures on Mathematical Logic. New York: Van Nostrand, 1981. [Wang 1981a]. ISBN 0-486-67632-3. Dover reprint 2014. ISBN 9780486676326
- Beyond Analytic Philosophy: Doing Justice to What We Know. Cambridge, Massachusetts: MIT Press, 1985. [Wang 1985a]. ISBN 0-262-23124-7.
- Reflections on Kurt Gödel. Cambridge, Massachusetts: MIT Press, 1987. [Wang 1987a]. ISBN 0-262-73087-1.
- Computation, Logic, Philosophy. A Collection of Essays. Beijing: Science Press; Dordrecht: Kluwer Academic, 1990. [Wang 1990a]. ISBN 7-03000211-3.
- A Logical Journey: From Gödel to Philosophy. Cambridge, Massachusetts: MIT Press, 1996. [Wang 1996a]. ISBN 0-262-23189-1.
