= Crystal Nights and Other Stories =

2009 collection of short science fiction stories by author Greg Egan

- Author: Greg Egan
- Language: English
- Genre: Science fiction, Hard science fiction
- Publisher: Subterranean Press
- Publication date: September 30, 2009
- Pages: 310pp
- ISBN: 978-1-59606-240-5

Crystal Nights and Other Stories is a collection of nine science-fiction short stories by Australian writer Greg Egan, published on 30 September 2009 by Subterranean Press. Two of the stories were nominated for the Hugo Award.

== Contents ==
- "Lost Continent" (2008)
- "Crystal Nights" (2008)
- "Steve Fever" (2007)
- "TAP" (1995)
- "Induction" (2007)
- "Singleton" (2002)
- "Oracle" (2000)
- "Border Guards" (1999)
- "Hot Rock" (2009)

== Background ==
"Singleton" and "Oracle" are set in the same universe as Egan's novel Schild's Ladder from 2002, but 20,000 years earlier. After their release, Egan was active in campaigning for refugee rights, including the end of mandatory detention for asylum seekers in Australia, for a few years. In an interview with David Conyers for Virtual Worlds and Imagined Futures in 2009, Egan called it an "eye-opening experience to see people mistreated in that way", revealing that "Lost Continent" about a time traveler seeking asylum but facing burocratic incompetence is "an allegory of the whole thing, just to get some of the anger out of my system and move on."

== Reception ==
=== Reviews ===
Greg Johnson, writing on the SF Site, states that the collection "represent Egan both at his best, and his most accessible" and that he "finds a way to balance the complexity of his ideas with enough story and character for the reader to care about them as stories and not just speculative essays on the latest in cosmology, physics or artificial intelligence research." This "shows how good a writer Greg Egan can be." In further detail, Johnson describes "TAP" as "a testament to Egan's depth as a science fiction writer" and writes that "Hot Rock" is "in many ways a throwback to the old style of hard science fiction, a story which presents us with the mystery of a new place, one that on first examination shouldn't exist." He adds that the "appeal of the story lies mainly in solving the mystery, but the main character is portrayed just sympathetically enough that we care at least as much for how the story affects her as we do for solving the mystery of how the planet of the story's title came to be."

Publishers Weekly referred to the collection as "steadfastly reductionist", noting that Egan "makes room for the moral implications of the treatment of refugees in 'Lost Continent,' while 'Crystal Nights' offers a pointed critique of technologists enthused by the idea of enslaved creations." They further claimed that "Egan can be heavy-handed at times, as in 'Oracle,' where the character Jack serves as a straw-man version of C.S. Lewis." They concluded, "More conventional SF puzzle stories like 'Hot Rock' and 'Tap' and a forcefully worded introduction on the ethics of artificial intelligence round out the volume".

=== Awards ===
"Border Guards" was nominated for the Hugo Award for Best Novelette in 2000. "Oracle" was nominated for the Hugo Award for Best Novella in 2001. "Crystal Nights" was nominated in 2008, and "Singleton" was nominated in 2002 for the British SF Association Award.

== See also ==
- 2009 in Australian literature
