= Axiomatic (short story collection) =

1995 collection of short science fiction stories by author Greg Egan

- First edition (publ. Millennium)
- Author: Greg Egan
- Genre: Hard science fiction
- Publisher: Millennium
- Publication date: January 1, 1995
- ISBN: 978-1-857-98281-7

Axiomatic is a 1995 collection of short science fiction stories by Greg Egan. The stories all delve into different aspects of self and identity.

== Neural mods ==
Several Axiomatic stories involve "neural mods", usually presented as small tubes containing powder inhaled through the nose, which alter the brains of their users in highly specific ways with advanced nanotechnology.

In the collection's eponymous story "Axiomatic", the protagonist enters a store selling mods not only for every variety of psychedelic experiences, but for altering one's personality traits, sexual orientation, and even religion. The protagonist seeks a custom-made mod that will suspend his moral convictions long enough for him to murder his wife's killer. In "The Walk", an executioner offers his victim a mod that will cause him to accept the executioner's personal philosophy, and thus help him cope with his death.

Neural mods feature prominently in Greg Egan's first science fiction novel, Quarantine.

== The Jewel ==
Two stories, "Learning to Be Me" and "Closer", involve a different kind of neural implant called a "jewel"—a small computer inserted into the brain at birth that monitors its activity in order to learn how to mimic its behavior. By the time one reaches adulthood, the jewel's simulation is a near-perfect predictor of the brain's activity, and the jewel is given control of the person's body while the redundant brain is discarded. In this way, people with the jewel can eliminate the cognitive decline associated with aging by implementing their minds on a machine. Also, by transplanting the jewels into cloned bodies genetically altered to develop without brains, they can live youthfully forever.

"Learning to Be Me" explores the consequences of a man's jewel failing to synchronize with his brain, while in "Closer" a couple arranges to have the internal states of their jewels gradually made more similar so they can temporarily become a single person.

== Minds uploaded to computers ==
Minds are transferred to computers in a different style in "A Kidnapping". People wishing to upload themselves into computer simulations to avoid death are periodically scanned so that a recent copy of the individual can be simulated in the event of death. Due to limited computing resources, however, uploaded people are simulated slower than their physical counterparts, making communication between them difficult.

This system of uploading minds features prominently in Greg Egan's novel Permutation City.

== Contents ==
The collection consists of 18 stories from a number of sources:

- "The Infinite Assassin" – An illegal recreational drug allows people to travel between parallel universes with disastrous side effects.
- "The Hundred-Light-Year Diary" – After the invention of a method for sending messages back in time, history of the future becomes common knowledge, and every person knows their own fate.
- "Eugene" – A married couple consults a genetic engineer to design their first child.
- "The Caress" – Police investigate the origin of a half-human, half-leopard chimera discovered in the basement of a murder victim.
- "Blood Sisters" – Two identical twin sisters are diagnosed with the same rare, fatal illness.
- "Axiomatic" – See notes above.
- "The Safe-Deposit Box" – A man inhabits the body of a different person every time he wakes up, and has lived this way his entire life.
- "Seeing" – A shooting victim's brain damage causes a permanent hallucination that he is watching himself from a bird's-eye view.
- "A Kidnapping" – See notes above.
- "Learning to Be Me" – See notes above.
- "The Moat" – Sperm taken from a rape victim are found to contain DNA altered to be invisible to genetic testing.
- "The Walk"
- "The Cutie" – A man longing to be a father uses recent advances in biotechnology to impregnate himself with a "Cutie", a child with sub-human mental capacities, sub-human legal status, and a lifespan of four years.
- "Into Darkness" – A giant sphere of unknown origin jumps between random locations on the Earth's surface and restricts the movement of objects trapped inside in bizarre ways.
- "Appropriate Love" – A woman carries the brain of her severely injured husband inside her uterus for two years so that a new (brainless) body can be cloned to replace his.
- "The Moral Virologist" – Inspired by the AIDS epidemic, a fundamentalist Christian devotes his life to the creation of virus that will kill those he views as sexually immoral.
- "Closer" – See notes above.
- "Unstable Orbits in the Space Of Lies" – An unexplained event causes everyone on Earth to rapidly become ideologically sympathetic to people physically nearby, creating a world with clear geographic boundaries between religions and philosophies that cause instant conversion for those who travel between regions.

== Reception ==
The Guardian described the book as "Wonderful, mind-expanding stuff, and well written too."

Danny Yee found that Axiomatic has "more original ideas ... than [he'd] seen in a science fiction collection for ages, and anyone who likes hard science fiction will revel in them."

On the Epiphyte Book review website Christina Schulman wrote, "Egan's ideas stretch your head the way the better cyberpunk does, without cyberpunk's self-indulgent grime and alienation."

== Adaptations ==
The production of a short film inspired by the story "Axiomatic" commenced in 2015, and the film was released online in October 2017.
