= Into Darkness =

Into Darkness may refer to:

- Into Darkness, a 1992 novelette by Greg Egan
- Star Trek Into Darkness, a 2013 film in the Star Trek franchise
- Into Darkness (album), the first and only full-length album of American doom metal band Winter

== See also ==
- Into Cold Darkness, the second album by Vital Remains
- Wikipedia Star Trek Into Darkness debate, a Wikipedia edit war that lasted from 2013 to 2014
