= Phoresis and Other Journeys =

2023 novella collection by Greg Egan

- Author: Greg Egan
- Language: English
- Genre: Science fiction, Hard science fiction
- Publication date: 2023
- ISBN: 978-1-922240-50-7

Phoresis and Other Journeys is a collection of three science-fiction novellas by Australian writer Greg Egan, published in 2023.

== Contents ==
- The Four Thousand, The Eight Hundred (2016), ISBN 978-1-59606-791-2
- Dispersion (2020)
- Phoresis (2018), ISBN 978-1-59606-866-7

== Reception ==
=== Reviews ===
==== The Four Thousand, The Eight Hundred ====
Publishers Weekly writes that the short story "successfully incorporates hot-button issues of intellectual property rights and government reparations for systematic bigotry into a far-future SF story" and is a "top-notch thought-provoking and suspenseful space opera, with impressively effective worldbuilding given its short length."

==== Dispersion ====
Russell Letson writes in the Locus Magazine, that the story "combines motifs from all over Egan territory: the social-ethical drama of people under extreme stress of 'Perihelion Summer' and 'The Four Thousand, the Eight Hundred'; the diseases of Distress, 'Silver Fire', and 'Reasons to Be Cheerful'; and the gnarlier physics-and-math exertions of Schild’s Ladder or Incandescence or the 'Luminous'/'Dark Integers' duo." It "is a cousin to Edwin Abbot’s [sic.] Flatland, on steroids laced with LSD" since the "exotic cosmology is overlaid onto a nearly allegorical portrait of communities occupying overlapping but immiscible spaces, facing the same crisis but failing to come together to deal with." He adds to "return to Egan for" the theme "to know and then to do the right thing; to be effective and moral, no matter the difficulty or discomfort."

==== Phoresis ====
Russel Letson writes in the Locus Magazine, that the characters "are gregarious, curious, imaginative, methodical, ingenious, and persistent" as well as that the novella is "intensely procedural" and that "the speculative-engineering side of the novel almost evades the feeling of fiction." He further writes that "drama arises from the social setting" and that "execution demands both vision and sacrifice on the part of those who will not see the work’s end", which makes the novella "strongly reminiscent of Incandescence and 'The Four Thousand, the Eight Hundred'." It is "the Tower of Babel, but without the hubris and confusion: a parable not of division and failure but of the triumph of ingenuity and selflessness – of hope."

=== Awards ===
"The Four Thousand, The Eight Hundred" was a finalist for the Ditmar Award in 2016 and reached the 5th place in the Reader Poll of the Locus Award in 2016.
