= Zero for Conduct (novelette) =

2013 novelette by Greg Egan

- Short story by Greg Egan
- Country: Australia
- Language: English
- Genre: Science fiction

Publication
- Published in: Twelve Tomorrows
- Media type: Print
- Publication date: September 2013

"Zero for Conduct" is a science-fiction short story by Australian writer Greg Egan, first published in Twelve Tomorrows (a special fiction edition of MIT Technology Review) edited by Stephen Cass in September 2013. The short story was included in the anthology The Year's Best Science Fiction: Thirty-First Annual Collection edited by Gardner Dozois in July 2014 as well as the collections The Best of Greg Egan in 2019 and Instantiation in 2020.

== Plot ==
Latifa is an Afghan teenager living in Iran and also a chemistry prodigy, both of which leads to her being bullied in school. By playing the virtual online game ChemFactor, used to find new molecules and new configurations, she has saved much time for its clients during the past three years. In order to stay under the radar, she has changed her virtual identity five times as her accomplishments are usually rewarded by computing power by the clients. Using this computing power and lab equipment in her school, she manages to create the first superconductor at room temperature. Due to her status, she devises a plan to gain a patent for the new material as an ordinary magnet and only reveals its secret afterwards.

== Translation ==
The short story was translated into Chinese.

== Reception ==
=== Reviews ===
Russell Letson, writing in the Locus Magazine, states that the short story is "a very procedural account of how a determined and smart teenaged girl not only devises a breakthrough technology but figures out how to exploit it commercially – all the while navigating a setting that vividly outlines the vulnerabilities resulting from her gender, age, and refugee status."

Salik Shah, writing in the Reactor Magazine, can "imagine that this story could become a film along similar lines to Chiwetel Ejiofor’s The Boy Who Harnessed the Wind (2019, written by William Kamkwamba) or perhaps a storyline set in the larger world of a TV series based on Egan’s novel Zendegi (2010), also set in Iran."

Publishers Weekly writes that "Egan’s talent for creating well-drawn characters shines" in the short story.

=== Awards ===
"Zero for Conduct" reached the 10th place at the Locus Award for Best Novelette in 2014.
