= Oceanic (book) =

2009 collection of short science fiction stories by author Greg Egan

- Author: Greg Egan
- Language: English
- Genre: Science fiction, Hard science fiction
- Publisher: Gollancz
- Publication date: July 16, 2009
- Pages: 496
- ISBN: 978-0-575-08654-8

Oceanic is a collection of 12 science fiction short stories by Australian writer Greg Egan, published on 16 July 2009 by Gollancz.

In 2009, the collect won the Aurealis Award for Best Collection. The title story, "Oceanic", won the Hugo Award for Best Novella; three more were nominated.

== Contents ==
- "Lost Continent" (2008)
- "Dark Integers" (2007)
- "Crystal Nights" (2008)
- "Steve Fever" (2007)
- "Induction" (2007)
- "Singleton" (2002)
- "Oracle" (2000)
- "Border Guards" (1999)
- "Riding the Crocodile" (2005)
- "Glory" (2007)
- "Hot Rock" (2009)
- "Oceanic" (1998)

== Background ==
"Singleton" and "Oracle" are set in the same universe as Egan's novel Schild's Ladder from 2002, but 20,000 years earlier. "Riding the Crocodile" is set in the same universe as Egan's novel Incandescence from 2008, but 300,000 years prior. None of the short stories is part of the novels.

Between the release of both novels, Egan was active in campaigning for refugee rights, mainly including the end of mandatory detention for asylum seekers in Australia, for a few years. In an interview with David Conyers for Virtual Worlds and Imagined Futures in 2009, Egan called it an "eye-opening experience to see people mistreated in that way", revealing that "Lost Continent" about a time traveler seeking asylum but facing bureaucratic incompetence is "an allegory of the whole thing, just to get some of the anger out of my system and move on."

== Reception ==
=== Reviews ===
In behalf of New Scientist, David Langford states that the collection "cover[s] a vast range" and is "audacious and understated, heady and highly intelligent."

Russell Letson, writing in the Locus Magazine, says that the title story "edges into extreme post-human and/or far-future territory, but that story’s armature is a kind of bildungsroman" and "is a whole novel’s worth of material that remains background."

=== Awards ===
In 2009, the collect won the Aurealis Award for Best Collection.

Three stories of the collection were nominated and one won the Hugo Award. "Oceanic" won the Hugo Award for Best Novella in 1999; "Oracle" was nominated for the award in 2001. "Border Guards" and "Dark Integers" were nominated for the Hugo Award for Best Novelette in 2000 and 2008 respectively;

"Crystal Nights" was a finalist for the British Science Fiction Award for Best Short Fiction.

== See also ==
- 2009 in Australian literature
