= This Is Not the Way Home =

This Is Not the Way Home may refer to:

- This Is Not the Way Home (album), a 1991 album by the Cruel Sea
- This Is Not the Way Home (short story), a science-fiction short story by Greg Egan
