= The Book of All Skies =

2021 novel by Greg Egan

- Author: Greg Egan
- Language: English
- Genre: Science fiction, Hard science fiction
- Publication date: 5 September 2021
- Pages: 232
- ISBN: 978-1922240378

The Book of All Skies is a science-fiction novel by Australian author Greg Egan, published in 2021. The novel describes a world with non-simply connected topology similar to the form of a spiral, whose nature is explored by the inhabitants, which also leads them to find out about their own history.

== Plot ==
Riemann surface of the logarithm

Del lives in a world, in which a loop around its center with crossing a hoop at its edge doesn't lead back to the original point, but instead a new segment with a new sky. (On the cover, this is illustrated with a spiral, which in mathematics does indeed arise from the Riemann surface of the logarithm.) All skies have been mapped by the ancient civilization of the Tolleans in the titular Book of All Skies, a copy of which Del and other archeologists bring into a museum in their home city Apasa. At night, Orsino steals the book, after which Del chases after him across multiple hoops. Orsino reveals to have been paid more by someone else and can get rid of Del by injuring her knee with a thrown stone. In Apasa, no money is promised for an arrest, to not give Orsino and those who hired him any satisfaction, but it is instead used for an own cartography of the skies. Del joins an expedition to the last hoop, after which there is only void. Measurements of gravity have unveiled that there must be land across the void. A bridge built across the void collapses, leaving Del and Imogen cut off from their group on the other side. Both encounter the indigenous people of the other side and learn their language as well as about the new world called Jierra, which turns out to be a planet orbiting around a star. Del and Imogen are unfamiliar with many concepts, like a day or a year, since the Hoops are in total darkness with their people having evolved to have infrared vision. They learn from the indigenous people that the Hoops were artificially created on Old Jierra as an alternative to interstellar travel to create more living space. A fatal accident that also destroyed Old Jierra flooded them with lava, cutting off the inhabitants within from the outside world. Any survivors who had already colonized other worlds in their system like Marrikh only returned to Jierra later. Subtle hints like the red color of Marrikh and a gas giant with four large moons in the system reveal that the story is actually set in the future of humanity, living on Terra and Mars. Del and Imogen return into the Hoops with the help of three ballons built by the inhabitants of Jierra. Since they are seen as a threat upon landing, they get shot, but manage to get down safely. Del then once again chases a traitor, who had sabotaged their mission by making the bridge crash and might be from the same group as Orsino, that turned out to try to prevent any contact between the two parts of humanity. She then proudly declares, that there won't be any separation any longer.

== Reviews ==
Russell Letson writes in the Locus Magazine, that there are "two Egans here, one a deviser of arcane, brain-twisting topological-mathematical schemes, and one a meticulous investigator of ethical, social, and psychological questions. Both are systematic, relentless, and fearless in these pursuits." He compares the novel to Greg Egan's novellas Dispersion and Phoresis (published in the collection Phoresis and Other Journeys), which also feature "people struggling to understand and deal with their world’s “nature"." Once again, he concludes, "the solutions emerge from reason, rigor, persistence, courage, and trust rather than competition or violence. Moral drama replaces melodrama. It's not only the science that's hard in these stories."

Emma Rayward writes in the Sydney Review of Science Fiction, that "the here and now is present" in the novel. Although two different economies clash together, she claims that Greg Egan "is not writing a social realist narrative on Australia’s border policy and his subsequent experiences of working with refugees; as he says, science fiction is not often so intentionally obvious in its symbolism and ‘is wasted when it’s used simply to crank out metaphors for familiar things; that’s like mistaking a microscope for a paperweight’." In this part of the novel, she also sees traces of different science fiction, writing: "This narrative structure – where two once-enclaves are opened up, intentionally or not, to exchange – can be traced to utopian science fiction, such as Ursula K. Le Guin’s The Dispossessed: An Ambiguous Utopia (1974) and Marge Piercy’s Woman on the Edge of Time (1976)." By leaving some questions about the theft of the book, the destruction of the mountain path or that of the bridge open, "Egan invites the reader to continue the speculative game."
