= The Year's Best Science Fiction: Seventeenth Annual Collection =

2000 anthology edited by Gardner Dozois

- Editor: Gardner Dozois
- Cover artist: Michael Carroll
- Language: English
- Series: The Year's Best Science Fiction
- Genre: Science fiction
- Publisher: St. Martin's Press
- Publication date: 2000 July (collecting stories published in 1999)
- Publication place: United States
- Media type: Print and e-book
- Pages: 688 (617 of stories)
- ISBN: 9780312262754 (hardcover) ISBN 9780312264178 (trade paperback) ISBN 9780312271626 (e-book)
- OCLC: 44655078
- Preceded by: The Year's Best Science Fiction: Sixteenth Annual Collection
- Followed by: The Year's Best Science Fiction: Eighteenth Annual Collection

The Year's Best Science Fiction: Seventeenth Annual Collection is a science fiction anthology which was compiled by Gardner Dozois and published in 2000. It won the Locus Award for best anthology in 1991.

== Contents ==
Like most of the books in the Year's Best Science Fiction series, the book consists of a "summation" section listing and commenting on developments in and related to science fiction in the previous year (1999), a selection of stories published in that year (each with an introduction by the editor), and a referenced list of honorable mentions from the stories not selected. The stories included in the book are as follows.

- David Marusek: "The Wedding Album"
- James Patrick Kelly: "10^{16} to 1"
- Robert Reed: "Winemaster"
- Alastair Reynolds: "Galactic North"
- Eleanor Arnason: "Dapple: A Hwarhath Historical Romance"
- Stephen Baxter: "People Came from Earth"
- Richard Wadholm: "Green Tea"
- Karl Schroeder: "The Dragon of Pripyat"
- Chris Lawson: "Written in Blood"
- Frederik Pohl: "Hatching the Phoenix"
- M. John Harrison: "Suicide Coast"
- Sage Walker: "Hunting Mother"
- Ben Bova: "Mount Olympus"
- Greg Egan: "Border Guards"
- Michael Swanwick: "Scherzo with Tyrannosaur"
- Robert Silverberg: "A Hero of the Empire"
- Paul J. McAuley: "How We Lost the Moon, A True Story by Frank W. Allen"
- Charles Sheffield: "Phallicide"
- Walter Jon Williams: "Daddy's World"
- Kim Stanley Robinson: "A Martian Romance"
- Tanith Lee: "The Sky-Green Blues"
- Hal Clement: "Exchange Rate"
- Geoff Ryman: "Everywhere"
- Mike Resnick: "Hothouse Flowers"
- Sean Williams: "Evermore"
- Robert Grossbach: "Of Scorned Women and Causal Loops"
- Kage Baker: "Son Observe the Time"
