= The Year's Best Science Fiction: Thirty-First Annual Collection =

2014 anthology edited by Gardner Dozois

- Dust jacket of first edition
- Editor: Gardner Dozois
- Cover artist: Jim Burns
- Language: English
- Series: The Year's Best Science Fiction
- Genre: Science fiction
- Publisher: St. Martin's Press
- Publication date: 2014
- Publication place: United States
- Media type: Print (hardcover & trade paperback)
- Pages: xliii & 705 pp
- ISBN: 9781250046208
- Preceded by: The Year's Best Science Fiction: Thirtieth Annual Collection
- Followed by: The Year's Best Science Fiction: Thirty-Second Annual Collection

The Year's Best Science Fiction: Thirty-First Annual Collection is an anthology of science fiction short stories edited by Gardner Dozois, the thirty-first volume in series. It was first published in hardcover, trade paperback and ebook by St. Martin's Press in July 2014, with an edition available from the Science Fiction Book Club issued in the same month. The first British edition was published in trade paperback by Robinson in November 2014, under the alternate title The Mammoth Book of Best New SF 27.

== Summary ==
The book collects thirty-two novellas, novelettes and short stories by various science fiction authors, with an introductory summation of the year, notes and concluding bibliography by the editor. The stories were previously published in 2013 in various science fiction and other magazines.

== Contents ==
- "Summation: 2013" (Gardner Dozois)
- "The Discovered Country" (Ian R. MacLeod)
- "The Book Seller" (Lavie Tidhar)
- "Pathways" (Nancy Kress)
- "A Heap of Broken Images" (Sunny Moraine)
- "Rock of Ages" (Jay Lake)
- "Rosary and Goldenstar" (Geoff Ryman)
- "Gray Wings" (Karl Bunker)
- "The Best We Can" (Carrie Vaughn)
- "Transitional Forms" (Paul J. McAuley)
- "Precious Mental" (Robert Reed)
- "Martian Blood" (Allen M. Steele)
- "Zero for Conduct" (Greg Egan)
- "The Waiting Stars" (Aliette de Bodard)
- "A Map of Mercury" (Alastair Reynolds)
- "One" (Nancy Kress)
- "Murder on the Aldrin Express" (Martin L. Shoemaker)
- "Biographical Fragments of the Life of Julian Prince" (Jake Kerr)
- "The Plague" (Ken Liu)
- "Fleet" (Sandra McDonald)
- "The She-Wolf's Hidden Grin" (Michael Swanwick)
- "Bad Day on Boscobel" (Alexander Jablokov)
- "The Irish Astronaut" (Val Nolan)
- "The Other Gun" (Neal Asher)
- "Only Human" (Lavie Tidhar)
- "Entangled" (Ian R. MacLeod)
- "Earth I" (Stephen Baxter)
- "Technarion" (Sean McMullen)
- "Finders" (Melissa Scott)
- "The Queen of Night's Aria" (Ian McDonald)
- "Hard Stars" (Brendan DuBois)
- "The Promise of Space" (James Patrick Kelly)
- "Quicken" (Damien Broderick)
- "Honorable Mentions: 2013" (Gardner Dozois)

== Awards ==
The anthology placed fifth in the 2015 Locus Poll Award for Best Anthology.
