= Unstable Orbits in the Space of Lies =

1992 short story by Greg Egan

- Short story by Greg Egan
- Country: Australia
- Language: English
- Genre: Science fiction

Publication
- Published in: Interzone
- Publication type: Periodical
- Publisher: TTA Press
- Media type: Print
- Publication date: July 1992

"Unstable Orbits in the Space of Lies" is a science-fiction short story by Australian writer Greg Egan, first published in Interzone #61 in July 1992. The short story was included in the collections Axiomatic in 1995 and The Best of Greg Egan in 2019.

== Plot ==
An unexplained event causes humans to adapt the beliefs of their surrounding humans, creating sharp boundaries in culture and religion as well as the appearance of attractors working similar to gravity. Although the protagonist prefers to travel in between them through a post-apocaliptic world with damaged infrastructure to avoid being sucked in, and in particular experiences the ancient clash between science and religion or tugs to rationality, solipsism and nihilism, it only leads to the realization to also be stuck in a belief system that manifests itself as paths instead of stable locations.

== Translations ==
The short story was translated into Japanese (1996), Czech by Petr Kotrle, French by Francis Lustman (1999), Romanian by Mihai-Dan Pavelescu (1999), Russian (1999), Hungarian by József Békési (2000), Italian (2003), Spanish (2006), Polish by Iwona Michalowska-Gabrych (2007) and Chinese (2017). The Chinese translation appeared in Science Fiction World.

== Background ==
Egan, in an interview with Eidolon in 1993, said to "rather have the reader imagine his or her home town" and to "only go into settings in detail if they're exotic, like the city in 'Unstable Orbits in the Space of Lies'". Egan was also asked about his "Century/Legend deal" which "included a collection and two novels, the first being Quarantine", to which he responded to first finish "the third novel, Permutation City" and that "[t]he short story collection will come after that, probably in 1994. The working title of the collection is Unstable Orbits." It was later retitled into Axiomatic and released in 1995, although it still included "Unstable Orbits in the Space of Lies".

== Reception ==
=== Reviews ===
Karen Burnham wrote in Greg Egan (Masters of Modern Science Fiction), that "The Safe-Deposit Box" "along with 'Unstable Orbits in the Space of Lies', is just about as non-scientific as Egan gets." She wrote in particular about the latter, that it "is a rare Egan story in which the fantastic premise is not scientifically supported (although it is rigorously developed)." She also wrote about her interpretation of the short story: "Can we ever know how many of our thoughts and beliefs are 'our own' and how many are 'merely' the result of unexamined assumptions and faith? Throughout it all, of course, there is still an 'I', a solid core of personality that has free will to act."

Jon Evans, writing in the Reactor Magazine, said that the short story "on one level is about strange attractors, but on another, just as compelling, is about belonging and belief and loneliness".

Russell Letson, writing in the Locus Magazine, stated that the short story "lies somewhere between a Borgesian fable and an old Galaxy-style comic inferno: a literalized metaphor worked out with science-fictional rigor".

=== Awards ===
The short story reached the 24th place of the Locus Award in 1993 and the 4th place of Asimov's Reader Poll in 1993. It was also nominated for the Japanese Seiun Award in 1997.

== Literature ==
- Burnham, Karen (2014). Greg Egan (Modern Masters of Science Fiction). Modern Masters of Science Fiction. University of Illinois Press (published 2014-04-03). ISBN 978-0252038419.
