= The Year's Best Science Fiction: Eleventh Annual Collection =

Anthology publication

- Dust cover of first edition
- Editor: Gardner Dozois
- Cover artist: Kim Poor
- Language: English
- Series: The Year's Best Science Fiction
- Genre: Science fiction
- Publisher: St. Martin's Press
- Publication date: 1994
- Publication place: United States
- Media type: Print (hardcover)
- Pages: li & 689 pp
- ISBN: 9780312111045
- Preceded by: The Year's Best Science Fiction: Tenth Annual Collection
- Followed by: The Year's Best Science Fiction: Twelfth Annual Collection

The Year's Best Science Fiction: Eleventh Annual Collection is an anthology of science fiction short stories edited by Gardner Dozois, the eleventh volume in an ongoing series. It was first published in hardcover and trade paperback by St. Martin's Press in August 1994, with a book club edition co-issued with the Science Fiction Book Club following in September 1994. The first British edition was published in hardcover by Robinson in October of the same year, under the alternate title The Best New Science Fiction: 8th Annual Collection.

== Summary ==
The book collects twenty-three novellas, novelettes and short stories by various science fiction authors, with an introductory summation of the year, notes and concluding list of honorable mentions by the editor. The stories were previously published in 1993 in various science fiction and other magazines.

== Contents ==
- "Summation: 1993" (Gardner Dozois)
- "Papa" (Ian R. MacLeod)
- "Sacred Cow" (Bruce Sterling)
- "Dancing on Air" (Nancy Kress)
- "A Visit to the Farside" (Don Webb)
- "Alien Bootlegger" (Rebecca Ore)
- "Death on the Nile" (Connie Willis)
- "Friendship Bridge" (Brian W. Aldiss)
- "Into the Miranda Rift" (G. David Nordley)
- "Mwalimu in the Squared Circle" (Mike Resnick)
- "Guest of Honor" (Robert Reed)
- "Love Toys of the Gods" (Pat Cadigan)
- "Chaff" (Greg Egan)
- "Georgia on My Mind" (Charles Sheffield)
- "Cush" (Neal Barrett, Jr.)
- "On the Collection of Humans" (Mark Rich)
- "There and Then" (Steven Utley)
- "The Night We Buried Road Dog" (Jack Cady)
- "Feedback" (Joe Haldeman)
- "Lieserl" (Stephen Baxter)
- "Flashback" (Dan Simmons)
- "A Child's Christmas in Florida" (William Browning Spencer)
- "Whispers" (Maureen F. McHugh and David B. Kisor)
- "Wall, Stone, Craft" (Walter Jon Williams)
- "Honorable Mentions: 1993" (Gardner Dozois)

== Awards ==
The anthology placed first in the 1995 Locus Poll Award for Best Anthology.
