= Eugene (short story) =

1990 short story by Greg Egan

- Short story by Greg Egan
- Country: Australia
- Language: English
- Genre: Science fiction

Publication
- Published in: Interzone
- Publication type: Periodical
- Publisher: TTA Press
- Media type: Print
- Publication date: June 1990

"Eugene" is a science-fiction short story by Australian writer Greg Egan, first published in Interzone #36 in June 1990. The short story was included in the collection Axiomatic in 1995.

== Plot ==
Angela and Bill, who have failed to conceive a child so far, intend to spend a large amount of money to artificially create a perfect child for themselves, which they plan to call Eugene. Both of them give in samples of their DNA. At first the plan seems to fail, but then a simulation on the computers of the clinic of how Eugene might later be like initiates contact with Angela and Bill. Eugene argues, that his existence is not necessary, when he already achieved so much without it. Angela and Bill then find out that the money they intended to spend on the creation of Eugene has been transferred to various organizations researching diseases or helping the poor.

== Translations ==
The short story was translated into Hungarian by Erno Nemes (1997), Romanian by Mihai-Dan Pavelescu, Italian (2003), Spanish (2006), French by Francis Lustman and Quarante-Deux (2006), Japanese by Makoto Yamagishi (2008), Chinese and Korean by Kim Sang-hoon.

== Reception ==
=== Reviews ===
Karen Burnham wrote in Greg Egan (Masters of Modern Science Fiction), that since Eugene is named after eugenics, "when Egan is at his most satirical he is also at his least subtle."

=== Awards ===
The short story reached the 7th place of the Interzone Readers Poll in 1991 (which was won by Egan's other short story "Learning to Be Me").

== Literature ==
- Burnham, Karen (2014). Greg Egan (Modern Masters of Science Fiction). Modern Masters of Science Fiction. University of Illinois Press (published 2014-04-03). ISBN 978-0252038419.
