= Didicosm =

Short story by Greg Egan

- Short story by Greg Egan
- Country: Australia
- Language: English
- Genre: Science fiction

Publication
- Published in: Interzone
- Publication type: Periodical
- Publisher: TTA Press
- Media type: Print
- Publication date: July/August 2023

"Didicosm" is a science-fiction short story by Australian writer Greg Egan, first published in Analog in July/August 2023.

== Plot ==
As a child, her father shows Charlotte the night sky and wants her to realize the truth about the endless worlds and possibilities in the universe. In one of his books, he read about the idea of the universe repeating, but with changes occurring and later uses this thought to rationalize his own suicide. After her mother dies as well, Charlotte is brought to her grandmother and later wants to find the correct topology of the universe, which turns out to be a didicosm (Hantzsche-Wendt manifold). Her own student later comes up with a theoretical explanation involving quantum gravity, concluding this shape is indeed canonical due to being the only platycosm with a finite first homology group. Charlotte returns to her partner thinking that she lives in the best possible universe.

== Background ==
Construction of the Hantzsche-Wendt manifold through (direct or twisted) identification of the surfaces of a cuboid

While the 3-torus ($T^3=\mathbb R^3/\mathbb Z^3$), also one of the ten platycosms, can be depicted as space-filling repetition of the exact same cube with same orientation (hence a cube with respective opposite sides identified with same alignment), the didicosm can be depicted as a chessboard-like filling featuring cubes flipped and turned upside down. Both illustrations are featured in the short story. In 1984, Alexei Starobinsky and Yakov Zeldovich at the Landau Institute in Moscow proposed a cosmological model where the shape of the universe is a 3-torus.

The first homology of the didicosm is $\mathbb Z_4^2$. (For the 3-torus it is $\mathbb Z^3$.) The derivation is explained by Greg Egan on his website, which also lists four academic papers taken for the scientific basis of the short story: "Describing the platycosms" by John Conway and Jean-Paul Rossetti, "The Hantzsche-Wendt Manifold in Cosmic Topology" by Ralf Aurich and Sven Lustig, "On the coverings of the Hantzsche-Wendt Manifold" by Grigory Chelnokov and Alexander Mednykh as well as "How Surfaces Intersect in Space" by J. Scott Carter.

== Reception ==
=== Reviews ===
Sam Tomaino, writing for SFRevu, thinks that the short story "gets a little technical but [has] an interesting idea."

Mike Bickerdike, writing for Tangent Online, states that "Didicosm" is "somewhat unusual as an SF short story, because while it is technically a story, it is more a speculation on whether Hantzsche–Wendt manifolds apply in cosmological topology." He claims that "there is a story here, but it is rather weak, and serves only as a vehicle" for the main idea, which is an "impenetrable subject for those [....] who lack a higher degree in theoretical physics or the relevant mathematics."

=== Awards ===
The short story was a finalist for the Analog Analytical Laboratory (AnLab) Award for best novelette in 2023.
