= The Year's Best Science Fiction: Twelfth Annual Collection =

1995 science fiction anthology edited by Gardner Dozois

- First edition
- Editor: Gardner Dozois
- Cover artist: Bob Eggleton
- Language: English
- Series: The Year's Best Science Fiction
- Genre: Science fiction
- Publisher: St. Martin's Press
- Publication date: 1995
- Publication place: United States
- Media type: Print (hardback & paperback)
- Pages: 697 pp
- ISBN: 9780312132224 (hardcover)
- Preceded by: The Year's Best Science Fiction: Eleventh Annual Collection
- Followed by: The Year's Best Science Fiction: Thirteenth Annual Collection

The Year's Best Science Fiction: Twelfth Annual Collection is a science fiction anthology edited by Gardner Dozois that was published in 1995. It is the 12th in The Year's Best Science Fiction series and won the Locus Award for best anthology.

== Contents ==
The book includes a 50-page summation by Dozois; 23 stories, all that first appeared in 1994, and each with a two-paragraph introduction by Dozois; and a referenced list of honorable mentions for the year. The stories are as follows.

- Ursula K. Le Guin: "Forgiveness Day"
- Robert Reed: "The Remoras"
- Maureen F. McHugh: "Nekropolis"
- Nancy Kress: "Margin of Error"
- Stephen Baxter: "Cilia-of-gold"
- William Sanders: "Going After Old Man Alabama"
- Michael F. Flynn: "Melodies of the Heart"
- Terry Bisson: "The Hole in the Hole"
- Pat Cadigan: "Paris In June"
- George Turner:"Flowering Mandrake"
- Joe Haldeman: "None So Blind," won the 1995 Hugo Award for Best Short Story
- Greg Egan: "Cocoon"
- Mike Resnick: "Seven Views of Olduvai Gorge," won the 1995 Hugo Award for Best Novella
- Geoff Ryman: "Dead Space for the Unexpected"
- Michael Bishop:"Cri de Coeur"
- Howard Waldrop: "The Sawing Boys"
- Ursula K. Le Guin: "The Matter of Seggri"
- Eliot Fintushel: "Ylem"
- Katharine Kerr: "Asylum"
- Walter Jon Williams: "Red Elvis"
- Mary Rosenblum: "California Dreamer"
- Lisa Goldstein: "Split Light"
- Brian Stableford: "Les Fleurs du Mal"
