= The Walk (short story) =

1992 short story by Greg Egan

- Short story by Greg Egan
- Country: Australia
- Language: English
- Genre: Science fiction

Publication
- Published in: Asimov's Science Fiction
- Publication type: Periodical
- Media type: Print
- Publication date: December 1992

"The Walk" is a science-fiction short story by Australian writer Greg Egan, first published in Asimov's Science Fiction in December 1992. The short story was included in the anthology The Pattern Maker edited by Lucy Sussex and the collection Axiomatic in 1995.

== Plot ==
A man who has crossed a mob financier is about to be executed by a hitman in the woods. When pleading for his life, the hitman offers him a neural implant forcing him to accept his approaching death. After indeed doing so and convincingly telling the hitman to no longer fear death, the hitman instead kills himself.

== Translation ==
The short story was translated into Hungarian by Attila Jeles, Czech by Petr Kotrle, Romanian by Mihai-Dan Pavelescu, Italian (2003), Spanish (2006), French by Francis Lustman & Quarante-Deux (2006), Japanese by Makoto Yamagishi (2008), Chinese and Korean.

== Reception ==
=== Reviews ===
Karen Burnham writes in Greg Egan (Masters of Modern Science Fiction), that the short story "looks again at the exact technology of 'Axiomatic'", but "it does so using a rather poorly motivated main actor". She argues: "The story does not work terribly well: because we never get the point of view of the hit man, we have no idea why he decides to kill himself."

=== Awards ===
The short story reached the 10th place of Asimov's Reader Poll in 1993.

== Literature ==
- Burnham, Karen (2014). Greg Egan (Modern Masters of Science Fiction). Modern Masters of Science Fiction. University of Illinois Press (published 2014-04-03). ISBN 978-0252038419.
