= Instantiation (collection) =

2020 short story collection by Greg Egan

- Author: Greg Egan
- Language: English
- Genre: Science fiction, Hard science fiction
- Publication date: 2020
- ISBN: 978-1-922240-33-0

Instantiation is a collection of eleven science-fiction short stories by Australian writer Greg Egan, published in 2020.

== Contents ==
- The Discrete Charm of the Turing Machine (2017)
- Zero for Conduct (2013)
- Uncanny Valley (2017)
- Seventh Sight (2014)
- The Nearest (2018)
- Shadow Flock (2014)
- Bit Players (2014)
- Break My Fall (2014)
- 3-adica (2018)
- The Slipway (2019)
- Instantiation (2019)

== Reception ==
=== Reviews ===
Russell Letson, writing in the Locus Magazine, claims that the short stories "Bit Players", "3-adica", and "Instantiation" all "outline the technical-legal problems of AI personhood as artificial personalities try to escape the virtual-reality game worlds that they have been programmed into." For "Bit Players", he adds that "is so sloppily worked out that newly generated character Sagreda intuitively knows that the physics can’t be consistent." For "3-adica", he adds that it contains "a game employing a topology based on an exotic number theory", which he "still can’t quite follow, though the bit players do, to their eventual benefit."

=== Awards ===
"The Discrete Charm of the Turing Machine" was a finalist for the Theodore Sturgeon Memorial Award in 2018 and reached the 4th place of Asimov's Reader Poll in 2018. "Zero for Conduct" reached the 10th place of the Locus Award for Best Novelette in 2014. "Uncanny Valley" was nominated for the British SF Association Award in 2018 and won the Japanese Seiun Award in 2020. "Seventh Sight" reached the 31st place at the Locus Award for Best Novelette in 2015 and was nominated for the Japanese Seiun Award in 2017. "Shadow Flock" reached th 34th place at the Locus Award for Best Novelette in 2015. "Bit Players" was nominated for the Japanese Seiun Award in 2020. "3-adica" reached the 3rd place of Asimov's Readers Poll in 2019.
