= Mithila Review =

Science fiction and fantasy magazine

- Editor: Salik Shah
- Categories: science fiction fantasy science fantasy speculative poetry
- Frequency: Quarterly
- Publisher: Salik Shah
- Founder: Salik Shah
- Founded: October 2015
- First issue: March 2016
- Country: India
- Language: English
- Website: mithilareview.com

Mithila Review is the only international science fiction and fantasy magazine published from India. It publishes original speculative fiction, poetry, reviews and interviews from authors from South Asia and around the world.

Contributors to the online magazine have included Ian McDonald, Cixin Liu, Kij Johnson, Lavie Tidhar, Ken Liu, Theodora Goss, Aliette de Bodard, Alyssa Wong, John Chu, Usman T Malik, Anil Menon, Dilman Dila, Dean Francis Alfar, Indrapramit Das and Rabi Thapa.

== Profile ==
Mithila Review was founded by Salik Shah in late 2015 with the editorial support from Ajapa Sharma and Isha Karki. The inaugural issue of the magazine was launched in March 2016. It adopted a quarterly publishing schedule, and became a paying market in October 2016. Every issue of Mithila Review is available to read online. Mithila Review relies primarily on donations and subscriptions as a source of funding through Patreon.

Salik Shah believes that the Mithila Review attempts to "decentre science fiction in an Anglo-centric, Euro-centric milieu".

== Awards ==
Mary Soon Lee won third prize in the Rhysling Award 2018 in the Long Poem category. The poem was originally published in Issue 9 of the Mithila Review.
