= Chaff (novelette) =

1993 short story by Greg Egan

- Short story by Greg Egan
- Country: Australia
- Language: English
- Genre: Science fiction

Publication
- Published in: Interzone
- Publication type: Periodical
- Publisher: TTA Press
- Media type: Print
- Publication date: December 1993

"Chaff" is a science-fiction novelette by Australian writer Greg Egan, first published in Interzone #78 in December 1993. The novelette was included in the anthology The Year’s Best Science Fiction: Eleventh Annual Collection edited by Gardner Dozois in 1994 and in the collections Our Lady of Chernobyl in 1995, Luminous in 1998 and The Best of Greg Egan in 2019.

== Plot ==
Colombia is stuck in a civil war between five different guerilla organisations. Furthermore, a failed terraforming experiment has produced an artificial species occupying roughly fifty square kilometres in the rainforest, a region known as El Nido de Ladrones (Spanish for "the nest of thieves"). After Guillermo Largo vanished into El Nido de Ladrones with classified genetic tools, and the appearance of a new drug capable of altering bone marrow, the protagonist is sent to capture him alive. Eventually the protagonist finds Largo and learns about his work on a new drug able to regenerate synapses and connections in the brain, giving people the possibility to do brain surgery themselves with lobotomy.

== Translation ==
The novelette was translated into Czech by Eva Hauserová (1996), French by Sylvie Denis and Francis Valéry (1996 and 2007), Italian (2001), Spanish by Carlos Pavón (2010), Chinese (2017), Japanese by Makoto Yamagishi (2022) and Korean by Kim Sang-hoon (2022).

== Reception ==
=== Reviews ===
Russell Letson, writing in the Locus Magazine, claims that the novelette "starts with weaponized and monetized biotech, but turns again to matters of moral-psychological choice, both personal and social, as some of that biotech offers a hardened DEA assassin the possibility of remaking his interior moral landscape."

Karen Burnham writes in Greg Egan (Masters of Science Fiction) that the novelette "focus[es] on technology that alters people’s fundamental personality/beliefs through neurochemistry."

=== Awards ===
The novelette reached the 13th place of the Locus Award in 1994 and the 7th place of the Interzone Readers Poll in 1994.

== Literature ==
- Burnham, Karen (2014). Greg Egan (Modern Masters of Science Fiction). University of Illinois Press (published 2014-04-03). ISBN 978-0252038419.
