= Border Guards (novelette) =

- Short story by Greg Egan
- Country: Australia
- Language: English
- Genre: Science fiction

Publication
- Published in: Interzone
- Publication type: Periodical
- Publisher: TTA Press
- Media type: Print
- Publication date: October 1999

"Border Guards" is a science-fiction novelette by Australian writer Greg Egan, first published in Interzone 148 in October 1999. The novelette was included in the anthologies The Year's Best Science Fiction: Seventeenth Annual Collection edited by Gardner Dozois in 2000, Year's Best SF 5 edited by David G. Hartwell in 2000 and Beyond Singularity edited by Jack Dann and Gardner Dozois. It was also published in the collection Oceanic in 2009.

== Plot ==
In the city of Noether in a 3-toroidal universe, Jamal and Margit play a game of quantum soccer, where the field is replaced by a potential well with infinitely high walls, the ball is replaced by a wave function and the players have to exchange energies between the modes with different frequencies to increase the wave function in the goal of the opposite team. Jamal's team loses the game to Margit's team and they talk afterwards. Jamal, who studies the category of complex representations of Lie groups since Emmy Noether was a pioneer of group theory, only ever had interest to learn and not to discover. Margit, on the other hand, reveals herself to have done so. Jamal at first suspects Margit to actually be Ndoli, the Nigerian neurologist who invented the jewel, a device capable of mapping a brain and hence eroding the border between life and death, or having worked with him. But Margit reveals herself to have been behind the discoveries of the new territories like their universe and to now guard their borders. Jamal convinces all their friends from quantum soccer to help her, so she can finally have time to join them to go swimming in the river.

== Translation ==
The novelette was translated into Japanese by Makoto Yamagishi (2001), Italian by Roberto Marini (2002), Dutch (2006), Polish by Iwona Michalowska-Gabrych (2007), French (2009) and Chinese (2024).

== Background ==
The Ndoli Device/jewel also appears in the short stories "Learning to Be Me" (1990) and "Closer" (1992) by Greg Egan.

== Reception ==
=== Reviews ===
Karen Burnham writes in Greg Egan (Masters of Science Fiction), that the novelette "has more to do with humanity’s dislocation in becoming immortal, as well as the lasting effects of trauma."

=== Awards ===
The novelette won the Locus Award for Best Novelette in 2000, was nominated for the Hugo Award for Best Novelette in 2000 and won the 6th place of the Interzone Readers Poll in 2000.

== Literature ==
- Burnham, Karen (2014-04-03). Greg Egan (Modern Masters of Science Fiction). Modern Masters of Science Fiction. University of Illinois Press. ISBN 978-0252038419.
