= Oceanic (novella) =

1998 novella by Greg Egan

- Short story by Greg Egan
- Language: English
- Genre: Science fiction novella

Publication
- Published in: Asimov's Science Fiction
- Publication type: Magazine
- Publication date: August 1998

"Oceanic" is a science fiction novella by Australian writer Greg Egan, published in 1998. It won the 1999 Hugo Award for Best Novella.

== Publication history ==
"Oceanic" was first published in the August 1998 edition of Asimov's Science Fiction by Dell Magazines. Editor Gardner Dozois republished it in The Year's Best Science Fiction: Sixteenth Annual Collection (1999) and The Best of the Best Volume 2: 20 Years of the Best Short Science Fiction Novels (2007). It was again republished in Greg Egan's collection Dark Integers and Other Stories (2008) and in Egan's collections Oceanic (2009) and The Best of Greg Egan (2019).

== Reception ==
=== Reviews ===
Russell Letson, writing in the Locus Magazine, says that the novella "edges into extreme post-human and/or far-future territory, but that story’s armature is a kind of bildungsroman" and "is a whole novel’s worth of material that remains background."

=== Awards ===
In 1999, "Oceanic" won the Hugo Award for Best Novella, Locus Award best novella, and Asimov's Reader Poll for best novella. It also won two foreign short story awards: the 2000 Hayakawa's SF Magazine Reader's Award and the 2001 Seiun Award. "Oceanic" was also a finalist in the 1998 Aurealis Award for best science fiction short story, a long list nominee for the 1999 James Tiptree Jr Memorial Award, and a short-list nominee for the 1999 HOMer Award for best novella.

== Synopsis ==
The story follows Martin, a Freelander living on the oceans of Covenant. As a boy he has a religious experience that shapes his life for years to come. As he grows into manhood his experiences and studies begin to conflict with his deep rooted faith. Eventually he joins a small circle of scholars studying the effects of one of Covenant’s most abundant microbes as his views of life change dramatically.
