= Teranesia =

1999 novel by Greg Egan

- First edition
- Author: Greg Egan
- Language: English
- Genre: Science fiction
- Publisher: Gollancz
- Publication date: 1999
- Publication place: Australia
- Media type: Print (Hardback & Paperback)
- Pages: 248
- ISBN: 0-575-06854-X
- OCLC: 41388662

Teranesia is a 1999 science fiction novel by Greg Egan. The novel follows protagonist Prabir Suresh, who lives on an island in the South Moluccas with his biologist parents, who are investigating the unique evolutionary traits of butterflies on the island. As civil war erupts in Indonesia, Prabir and his baby sister Madhusree must escape the islands. When they grow up, Madhusree becomes a biology student, motivated to carry on her parents' legacy in uncovering the evolutionary phenomenon. Prabir reluctantly follows her, as he must navigate and confront the truth that shaped his past.

The novel encircles notions of sexuality and free will. Where Egan is regarded as a hard science fiction author, Teranesia stands out as one of his few character driven novels. Egan's personal interest in migration politics permeates through Teranesia, as he explores the migration experience of Prabir and Madhusree as they seek asylum in Canada. Teranesia received critical acclaim, as well as award nominations and wins. The novel won the 2000 Ditmar Award for Best Novel but Egan declined to accept the award.

== Plot ==
9-year-old Prabir Suresh lives on a small tropical island among the South Moluccas where strange mutations generate unique plants, birds and creatures. His life revolves around the jungle, which he calls Teranesia; school; and friendships he makes on the internet. Prabir lives on the island with his baby sister, Madhusree and parents who are both research biologists, currently studying the evolution of a species of butterflies that strays from conventional evolution.

Civil war breaks out in Indonesia, with heated attacks against the Javanese empire. One day planes fly by and drop mines, some falling in Prabir's family garden. While tending to the garden the next day, Prabir's father is gravely injured by a mine. Prabir and his mother attempt to help pull his father out of the garden, but his mother loses her balance and Prabir witnesses them both die after falling on another mine. Shocked from the explosion and sudden death of his parents, Prabir escapes the island with his fifteen-month-old sister. As the civil war expands across the area, they scramble on a boat to the nearest inhabited island, where they are taken to Australia, and seek asylum with their aunt in Canada, far way away from Teranesia and their family's homeland of India.

Prabir dedicates his life to parenting Madhusree over the next 20 years, while navigating his sexuality as a gay man and being separated from his homeland. He starts work at a bank and Madhusree grows to pursue biology, carrying the lineage of their parents' passion for evolutionary research. One day, reports emerge of an abnormal species of plants and animals that have mutated throughout the South Moluccas region that are going out of control, including on the island Prabir called Teranesia. Prabir recognises the similarity in these characteristics to the butterflies his parents were studying many years ago. Madhusree decides to go on a scientific expedition to explore these strange mutations. Prabir suffers anxiety and apprehension at the thought of revisiting the islands they grew up in. He tries desperately to convince Madhusree not to go, but this only motivates her more strongly. Prabir, left alone, broods about the meaninglessness of his life and attempts suicide. In the last minute, he decides to chase her to the islands instead, still distressed at the thought of her revisiting Teranesia.

Traveling back to the islands, Prabir undergoes a traumatic realisation of his past. When Prabir was young, he exchanged messages with a professor in the United States, posing as his father. While trying to reassure her of the growing unrest, he made statements that made him sound like an insurgent. He assumes the messages were intercepted, and believes he's the reason the militia plane flew to their home, ultimately causing his parents' deaths. In considering his past, Prabir realises his effort to prevent Madhusree from traveling to the islands was more to protect himself than her.

Now invigorated to uncover the mystery of the mutations, Prabir encounters Martha Grant, a biologist who is also studying them. Grant is working under a pharmaceutical company, which forbids her to publish her results. They strike a deal – Prabir will guide her to the island Teranesia if she promises to publish her results on the internet. Grant challenges Prabir, asking if he had ever tried to protect Madhusree for another reason than the fact she's his sister. Prabir becomes agitated at the thought that his inclination to take care of Madhusree was genetically determined rather than a choice he made of his free will.

A research team identifies the gene causing the unusual mutations as the São Paulo protein. A physicist on the team suggests the protein uses quantum superposition to figure out which mutation is most beneficial to the organism. They realise this is how the mutations are propagating at such a rapid pace.

Prabir gets scratched by mutant shrubs that are native to the island. After exploring his family's former home, disgusted by his behaviour as a child, he proceeds to the mine-infested garden in a suicide attempt. Grant, having pretended to return to their boat but realizing something is off, uses multiple tranquilizer darts to stop Prabir and convince him that his parents' death wasn't his fault. In a moment Prabir ends up regretting, he and Grant begin to kiss, but she rebuffs him when coming to her senses.

When they return to the island where Madhusree's expedition is camping, Grant and Prabir encounter Christian militia, who end up testing him for the mutant gene, only to find that he carries the São Paulo protein in his bloodstream. The militia commander starts interrogating Prabir, asking if he had raped Grant. Prabir, being gay, realises his uncharacteristic sexual urges towards Grant were probably due to the high libido associated with the protein. Upon reflection of his behaviour and the speed of propagation of the protein, he discerns the protein must have some consciousness in how to breed most successfully.

The militia group immediately quarantines Prabir on an offshore boat, only for him to be rescued by Madhusree, who keeps him in an isolation raft. She continuously monitors his condition as they hurry to the nearest hospital, while Prabir's physicality changes in extreme ways. He starts to grow a rigid carapace rendering him immobile. Prabir senses the gene has enabled him to undergo an intense metamorphosis. In the havoc of this change, he realises the gene is going to seize all elements of human consciousness - love, intelligence, honesty and reflection. The gene's sole aim is to procreate above everything else, stripping him of his sentience and agency.

He tells Madhusree to tranquilize and burn him, in an attempt to end his life before he is taken over and stop the spread of the São Paulo protein. She is unable to knock him out due to the protein adapting to the tranquilizing agent. Madhusree has an epiphany and realizes the protein is somehow sentient and is reacting to their attempts to destroy or stop it. She extracts a sample from Prabir's last remaining spot of human flesh, and makes a promise to give it a new host to propagate in. Prabir rapidly returns to normal, and promises to take Madhusree to a festival in Calcutta, where their parents tested the limits of the human body before they were born.

== Background ==
Teranesia is a product of Egan's interest in quantum mechanics, Indonesian civil politics during the 1990s and rationalism. Karen Burnham, an engineer and science fiction literary critic, stated how Egan's novels dive into scientific and socio-political discourse in an "elegant" way to contribute to these conversations. Burnham wrote a book dedicated to Greg Egan's hard science fiction craft and artistic agenda, with an exclusive interview with notoriously private Egan.

Greg Egan received a Bachelors of Science degree in mathematics from University of Western Australia. In Teranesia, American literary critic N. Katherine Hayles analyses how Egan conceptualised how quantum mechanics can intersect with consciousness in Teranesia, a reflection of his studies into mathematical theories. Egan dives into the foundations of quantum mechanics in a series called 'Foundations', where he explains modern physics concepts for fans who yearn to understand the scientific theory in his fictions.

Egan has been vocal about his disdain in Australia's treatment of refugees and asylum seekers. In the Afterword for Teranesia, Egan remarks the austere conditions of Australia's detention centres and the 2001 Tampa Affair which roused Australia's border protection policy. He concludes he feels a "melancholic duty to report" these "atrocities". Egan dedicated himself to the refugee support movement, visiting refugees who had been detained and welcoming his home to those released from detention centres seeking a new life in Australia. This highlights Egan's field of research and inspiration when building the landscape of Teranesia. The refugee experience and impacts of migration can be seen in an array of his novels such as Distress (1995), Zendegi (2010) and Teranesia (1999), where Prabhir and Madhursee seek asylum in Canada. Steven Shaviro, an American philosopher and cultural critic states how Teranesia explores ramifications of inter-ethnic and religious conflict in Indonesia through migration.

In the acknowledgements of Teranesia, Egan shows appreciation toward The Malay Archipelago (1869) by Alfred Russel Wallace, a journal of scientific exploration around the Dutch East Indies, also known as Malaysia, Singapore and Indonesia. He also mentions 'The Spice Islands Voyage' by Tim Severin which recounts Severin's expedition of where Wallace had initially explored 140 years later. This inspired Egan's take on the ecology of the islands of the South Mollacus in the novel. Egan references documentary Guru Busters, directed and produced by Robert Eagle, which follows members of the Indian Rationalist Association journey in debunking those who claim supernatural powers.

== Themes ==
This novel involves intersecting commentary on sexuality and gender, biological evolution, consciousness and rationality.

=== Sexuality ===
In numerous interviews leading up to the publication of Teranesia, Egan states that a central theme of Teranesia is biological evolution and "sexuality". Christopher Palmer, a fiction author with expertise in science fiction dissects Egan's take on dismantling gender stereotypes in Teranesia. Kate Burnham shares this perspective of Egan, stating how he is a pioneer in "shaping social pressures" placed on women in fields of science, as well as the science fiction genre. Palmer highlights a pattern of Prabir being saved by women through the story - female scientist saves him from a python, Grant prevents him from suicide, Madhusree rescues him from Christian militia and treats him as gene overrides the physicality of his body.

Burnham calls attention to Egan's satirical take on postmodern intellectual fads that rose in the 1990s. In Teranesia, Prabir's aunt makes a comment on how computers are reinforcing the patriarchy due to the sexist nature of ones and zeros which are the foundation of binary numbers. Burnham deciphers this as a satirical comment from Egan as his way of demonstrating how claiming the "practice of science" has been hostile to women is different to how "science itself" is inherently patriarchal.

=== Free Will and Consciousness ===
In an article in The New York Review of Science Fiction, Kate Burnham comments on Egan's affinity to explore free will, but "not without its limits". Palmer supports this idea, voicing how in Teranesia, Egan has a clear inclination to tell stories regarding rationalism and self-willed decision making. He continues to state as Teranesia is one of Egan's character-driven novels, emphasis on Prabir's self-determinism and rational thought roots from his father's involvement with the Indian Rationalist Association. In an exclusive interview between Burnham and Egan, Egan extends the rationalist mindset to religion. He proclaims its "absurd" to abstain from asking the logical implications of religious claims to the existence of an "afterlife" or "immaterial soul".

In N. Katherine Hayles' journal article surrounding the notions of cognitive consciousness in Teranesia, she transcends this state of mind to a perpetuating motif in the novel. Hayles analyses the climax of the novel - when biologist Grant finds that the gene is propagating through quantum superposition to find which quantum state will reproduce most successfully. She offers these moments to draw parallels on the consciousness of a non-conscious gene, to offer a "millennial reassessment" of what consciousness means with the intersection of technology and biology. Burnham notes Egan's fascination across novels of bioethical complications that will become pertinent with the rise of technology.

== Reception ==
Teranesia has received polarising reviews on Greg Egan's style and narrative arc. Egan has received a positive reception regarding his integration of scientific concepts through his narratives. Egan is regarded as a "hard science fiction pioneer", integrating complex scientific or mathematic notions in his narratives. Simon Petrie, a recognised science fiction writer and judge of the Aurealis Awards, comments on how 'Teranesia' is unique amongst the rest of Egan's novels being more character driven than science driven.

Greg L Johnson, a writer for the New York Review of Science Fiction, and Petrie both state the real strength of Egan's Teranesia is in the character development, notably the protagonist Prabir, where responders are more concerned with Prabir's emotional crisis than the scientific discoveries. Johnson critiques the pace of the narrative, expressing the last chapters were too rushed in comparison to the rest of the novel.

Science fiction writer and academic Jon Courtenay Grimwood shares the notion of Egan's contribution to science fiction, stating that in 'Teranesia' Egan can make the "passion of science appear understandable to non-scientists". Grimwood then critiques how Egan doesn't fully explore pertinent themes in the narrative such as religion, political strife and Indonesian imperialism in detail, leaving fallacies when constructing motivations for the protagonist Prabir.

Some academic critics praise Egan's study into human sentience and consciousness. N. Katherine Hayles, whose specialty lies in the literary intersection of technology and science, claims that Egan's novels, including 'Teranesia' offers a "millennial reassessment" to the concepts of consciousness. Literary and science fiction expert and author Christopher Palmer asserts how Egan intertwines biological concepts of evolution to exemplify human flaws such as misjudgements and impulse.

== Awards ==
Teranesia received multiple genre award nominations and wins. It won the Australian Ditmar Award for Best Novel of the Year, but Egan declined the award stating that in 1996 he had permanently recused from any further consideratiuon "in protest lack of permanent rules governing the Ditmar Awards from year to year".

- Win – 1999 Aurealis Award for SF Novel
- Nomination Below Cutoff – 1999 Tiptree Award for Gender-Bending SF
- Win – 2000 Ditmar Award for Best Novel
- 10th Place – 2000 Locus Award for best SF Novel
- Nomination Below Cutoff – 2000 Hugo Award for Best Novel
- Nomination – 2002 Kurd Lasswitz Award for Bestes ausländisches Werk
