= The Best of Greg Egan =

2019 story collection by Greg egan

- Author: Greg Egan
- Language: English
- Genre: Science fiction short story collection
- Publisher: Subterranean Press
- Publication date: December 2019
- Publication place: Australia
- Media type: Print
- Pages: 731 pp.
- ISBN: 978-1-59606-942-8

The Best of Greg Egan is a collection of science fiction stories by Australian writer Greg Egan, published by Subterranean Press in 2019.

The collection contains 20 stories which were published in a variety of original publications. It is also accompanied by an Afterword from the author.

== Contents ==
- "Learning to Be Me"
- "Axiomatic"
- "Appropriate Love"
- "Into Darkness"
- "Unstable Orbits in the Space of Lies"
- "Closer"
- "Chaff"
- "Luminous"
- "Silver Fire"
- "Reasons to be Cheerful"
- "Oceanic"
- "Oracle"
- "Singleton"
- "Dark Integers"
- "Crystal Nights"
- "Zero for Conduct"
- "Bit Players"
- "Uncanny Valley"
- "3-adica"
- "Instantiation"
- "Afterword"

== Critical reception ==
Writing in Locus Magazine reviewer Russell Letson noted Egan's statement in his Afterword that the stories here concern "the struggle to come to terms with what it will mean when our growing ability to scrutinize and manipulate the physical world reaches the point where it encompasses the substrate underlying our values, our memories, and our identities." Letson then went on to say: "Of course, there is more to Egan's thematic universe – notably in his far-future and virtual-environments settings – and there are recurring figures and motifs that run across the whole range of his work: refugees, exiles, outsiders and outliers, unpersons, relentless investigators and explorers and explainers-of-phenomena, inventors and devisers of understandings. Most of these stories do indeed emphasize his examinations of how we experience ourselves – our understandings, our feelings, our motives, our sense of who-we-are and what-we-mean and what-we-value." Concluding: "Egan is determined to make sense of everything – to understand the whole world as an intelligible, rational, material (and finally manipulable) realm – even if it means abandoning comfortable and comforting illusions. This is fundamental to the whole project of SF and it's why Egan's Best – and his Rest – is worth any number of looks."

== See also ==
- 2019 in Australian literature
