= Appropriate Love =

1991 short story by Greg Egan

- Short story by Greg Egan
- Country: Australia
- Language: English
- Genre: Science fiction

Publication
- Published in: Interzone
- Publication type: Periodical
- Publisher: TTA Press
- Media type: Print
- Publication date: August 1991

"Appropriate Love" is a science-fiction short story by Australian writer Greg Egan, first published in Interzone #50 in August 1991. The short story was included in the collection Axiomatic in 1995 and The Best of Greg Egan in 2019.

== Plot ==
After a horrible car crash, which completely shattered the body of her husband Chris Perrini, his wife Carla Perrini is offered a strange solution to restore his former life as their insurance only covers the cheapest option: By enclosing his brain in a fluid-filled membrane, putting it inside her uterus and connecting it to her bloodflow, it can be kept alive while a new brainless body is cloned for him. The process takes two years in total. Chris wakes up in his new body and expresses his love for Carla. When they sleep together again, she begins to realize, that the fake pregnancy and his youthful body causes her to begin loving him like a son.

== Translation ==
The short story was translated into French by Sylvie Denis and Francis Valéry (1994 and 2006), Finnish by Tapani Ronni (1997), German by Irene Holicki (1998), Hungarian by Orsolya Erdo (1998), Spanish by Carlos Pavón and Sonia Baldrés (1998), Czech by Petr Kotrle (1998), Romanian by Mihai-Dan Pavelescu and Florin Pîtea (1999), Italian by Riccardo Valla (2003), Japanese by Makoto Yamagishi (2003) as well as Korean by Kim Sang-hoon (2002). The French translation appeared under two different titles, the former being "Baby Brain" and the latter being a French translation of "Appropriate Love". The Chinese translation appeared in Science Fiction World, as well as in translations of the collections Axiomatic and The Best of Greg Egan.

== Reception ==
=== Reviews ===
Russell Letson, writing in Locus magazine, states that "Egan does not shrink from looking into any abyss, whether the topic is the authenticity of subjectivity or the genuineness of the most intimate relationships." He adds that "the agent of change is not some neurological black box but, ironically, the severe physical and emotional adaptations the narrator undergoes in order to save her husband's life. Nevertheless, despite her genuine initial devotion, romantic attachment evaporates."

Karen Burnham writes in Greg Egan (Modern Masters of Science Fiction), that the short story "asks how much trauma we may require loved ones to go through in order to preserve the life of a family member" and that "Egan’s fiction paints a rather cynical view of the healthcare industry as a whole and the insurance industry in particular."

=== Awards ===
The short story reached the 9th place in the Interzone Reader's Poll in 1992 and was nominated for the Seiun Award in 2004.

== Literature ==
- Burnham, Karen (2014). Greg Egan (Modern Masters of Science Fiction). Modern Masters of Science Fiction. University of Illinois Press (published April 3, 2014). ISBN 978-0252038419.
