= Singleton (short story) =

Short story by Greg Egan

- Short story by Greg Egan
- Country: Australia
- Language: English
- Genre: Science fiction

Publication
- Published in: Interzone
- Publication type: Periodical
- Publisher: TTA Press
- Media type: Print
- Publication date: February 2002

"Singleton" is a science-fiction short story by Australian writer Greg Egan, first published in Interzone 176 in February 2002. The short story was included in the collections Crystal Nights and Other Stories and Oceanic in 2009, as well as The Best of Greg Egan in 2020. The short story is set in the same universe as Egan's short story "Oracle" and Egan's novel Schild's Ladder.

== Plot ==
In 2003, Ben, after some hesitation, intervenes in a kitchen hand being beaten to death. Feeling confident, he later invites his fellow student Francine to a concert and begins a relationship with her. In 2012, after Ben arrives back from Basra, Francine tells him she is pregnant. He reads about an experiment involving quantum computers conducted at Delft University and begins to think about the many-world-interpretation. Francine later suffers a miscarriage. In 2020, Ben participates in a neurological experiment, which proves consciousness to be a purely classical phenomenon. Parallel, he develops the qusp (Quantum Singleton Processor) only carrying out a single calculation without making alternatives real. He discusses with Francine an operation enabling her to have children after the miscarriage again, but they decide to instead use the qusp to raise an AI child. In 2029, they experiment with Zelda, a neural network of a mouse's brain running on a qusp. The qusp is already used to create adai (Autonomously Developing Artificial Intelligence). In 2031, they use their blood samples to create an adai child, which they name Helen. Five bodies are delivered for Helen to use. In 2041, Helen slowly begins to find out about her difference from other children and asks her parents, who discuss telling her the truth. Ben calms her down by hinting, that she is something better and newer, which actually is what causes a rise of hate against adai. In 2050, Helen has vanished. Ben and Francine have both spent years searching for her. Ben finally finds her in shackles and retrieves her qusp. On their way home, he tells her about the beating which started everything. Ben reflects, that there are still branches of himself, which haven't yet or will never invent the qusp. Helen then wants to initiate contact with them, claiming she only needs time.

== Reception ==
=== Reviews ===
Karen Burnham, writing in The New York Review of Science Fiction, concludes after a discussion of the short stories "Axiomatic", "Mister Volition" and "Singleton", that "not everyone is as sanguine about the continuity of consciousness when making the transition to substances other than our organic brains nor so worried about the moral implications of the many-worlds interpretation of quantum physics." She claims that "Egan’s stories show a continuity of concern about these subjects that refuses superficial answers and instead examines them in depth."

=== Awards ===
The short story was nominated for the British SF Association Award in 2003.
