= The Planck Dive =

1998 novelette by Greg Egan

- Short story by Greg Egan
- Language: English
- Genre: Science fiction

Publication
- Published in: Isaac Asimov's Science Fiction Magazine
- Publication type: Magazine
- Publication date: February 1998

"The Planck Dive" is a science fiction novelette by Australian writer Greg Egan, published in 1998.

It was nominated for the 1999 Hugo Award for Best Novelette.

== Plot summary ==
The story is set in the polis known as Cartan Null, where five explorers are preparing to send cloned copies of themselves on a scientific journey into a black hole. As they are about to make the dive a biographer from Earth and his daughter arrive with intentions of writing their story.

== Publication history ==
After the story's initial publication in Isaac Asimov's Science Fiction Magazine in February 1998 it was included in the author's short story collection Luminous later in 1998.

== See also ==
- Diaspora
