= The Slipway =

2019 short story by Greg Egan

- Short story by Greg Egan
- Country: Australia
- Language: English
- Genre: Science fiction

Publication
- Published in: Analog
- Publication type: Periodical
- Media type: Print
- Publication date: July/August 2019

"The Slipway" is a science-fiction novelette by Australian writer Greg Egan, first published in Analog in July/August 2019. It describes the discovery of a wormhole approaching the Earth. It was included in the collection Instantiation. Greg Egan described the scientific background of the short story in the essay The View through a Wormhole.

== Plot ==
With the hint of a farmer, who has already discovered an asteroid, Fatima and Gabrielle discover new stars in the night sky, which turn out to come from a wormhole, called the Pane. Theories of alien intergalactic transport networks or a proof of string theory spread across the world, but all measurements of size, position and velocity of the Pane fail. After the Pane has reached twice the size of the full moon, Fatima proposes that the Pane is actually as large as the Solar System and travels close to the speed of light, hence the Solar System has already passed it and the night sky is only an illusion created by the light travelling from the past with them. Her hypothesis is at first rejected, and she showered with rape and death threats, also fuelled by racism and sexism since she is a Senegalese woman. But as the Pane continues to grow, desperate plans to send out spaceships and space probes back are made. Gabrielle eventually realizes that the other side of the Pane is again their original position and that it showed them an 67,000 year of snapshot of the night sky within. Fatima and Gabrielle immediately go back to their observation of the phenomenon, to find it again, if it's natural, or create it themselves one day, if it's artificial.

== Reception ==
=== Reviews ===
Rich Horton wrote in Locus Magazine that the short story "qualifies as pure a hard SF story as you might want – so much so that I wish he’d included some diagrams and equations" and that "in purest SF fashion, the working out of the story is essentially the process of coming to understand what this thing – called 'the Pane' – really is, and the reader is invited to indulge their sense of wonder by the end."

Victoria Silverwolf wrote on Tangent Online that "full appreciation of the premise requires familiarity with many concepts of modern astrophysics", which has "a true sense of wonder, describing an amazing event with rigid scientific logic." She also praises that "the characters in the story are little more than a way for the author to present a fascinating idea in the form of fiction."

Sam Tomaino wrote on SF Revu that "the explanation for what [the Pane] is makes for a very imaginative story" and that "it has well-drawn characters, too." He adds that it is a "great end" of the July/August 2019 issue of Analog Science Fiction and Fact.

=== Awards ===
"The Slipway" was nominated for the Analog Analytical Laboratory (AnLab) Award for Best Novelette in 2019.
