= Reasons to Be Cheerful (short story) =

1997 short story by Greg Egan

"Reasons to be Cheerful"
- Short story by Greg Egan
- Country: Australia
- Language: English
- Genre: Science fiction

Publication
- Published in: Interzone
- Publication type: Periodical
- Publisher: TTA Press
- Media type: Print
- Publication date: April 1997

"Reasons to Be Cheerful" is a science-fiction short story by Australian writer Greg Egan, first published in Interzone 118 in April of 1997. The short story was included in the collections Luminous in 1998 and The Best of Greg Egan in 2020.

== Plot ==
In 2004, twelve-year-old Mark suddenly enters a state of constant happiness. After also losing balance when walking, a medulloblastoma is discovered in his brain causing higher levels of Leu-enkephalin, which binds to the same receptors as morphine or heroin and hence is the reason for his happiness. Mark physically cannot be sad about the diagnosis. After the medulloblastoma is removed, he becomes depressive and his relationship with his parents worsens. Psychologists assume that he now associates happiness with a return of the tumor. In 2023, Mark has reflected for many years about happiness just being a result of chemical reactions in the brain and to possibly be meaningless. He travels to Cape Town in South Africa to undergo a surgery, during which cavities from dead neurons in his brain will be filled with a special foam forming a new neural network combined from that of four thousand dead strangers. The surgery gives him the ability to choose what to be happy about and he can indeed enjoy every piece of art and music presented to him. He now wonders if this happiness is actually real and whether the four thousand dead strangers in his head will now always lead him down the path of least resistance. He reflects again, that when making choices for the causes for his happiness, he must be able to live with the possibility of them being wrong. Mark returns to Sydney and takes a job in a bookstore, in which he can use spare time to read its books, and begins to date Julia, who comes by there often. His father visits him one day and asks, if he is happy now, to which Mark replies that he is.

== Translation ==
The short story was translated in German (1999), French (1999), Italian (2001), Japanese (2001) and Spanish (2002).

== Background ==
Egan said that writing the short story took three months in an interview with Russell B. Farr in 1997. He later elaborated to have thought about the central premise for a few years in an interview with David Conyers for Virtual Worlds and Imagined Futures in 2009. In the latter he considers it to be his favorite short story as it "felt [....] like a jigsaw puzzle that couldn’t have been put together any other way.“ He added that "more than ten years later", he is "still happy with every word", which "doesn’t happen often."

== Reception ==
=== Reviews ===
Russell Letson, writing in Locus, states that the short story "pursues the nature and genesis of emotional states – the ‘‘reasons’’ are entirely neurochemical-physiological, and the mechanism of feeling is literally a mechanism – a computational prosthetic intended to repair neurological damage to the pleasure centers."

Salik Shah, writing in Reactor, compared Mark to Frannie Goldsmith (from Stephen King's The Stand), and doubted that Frannie would have accepted an equivalent medical procedure. He concluded that "Egan’s characters can be as real as King’s."

=== Awards ===
The short story won the Japanese Seiun Award in 2002. It was also nominated for an Aurealis Award and a Ditmar Award, both in 1998. It reached the 5th place in the Reader Poll of the Locus Award in 1998 and won the Interzone Readers Poll in 1998.
