= Luminous (book) =

Story collection by Greg Egan

- First edition cover
- Author: Greg Egan
- Publisher: Millennium
- Publication date: 1998
- ISBN: 1-85798-573-7
- Dewey Decimal: 823/.914
- LC Class: PR9619.3.E35 L86 1999

Luminous is a collection of short science fiction stories by Greg Egan first published in 1998 by Millennium.

== Contents ==
Luminous contains the following short stories:

- "Chaff" — An agent is sent to kill a geneticist who is working on important brain-altering research in a drug lord-controlled stronghold in the jungles of Colombia.
- "Mitochondrial Eve" — An organization is trying to trace a common maternal ancestor for recent humanity.
- "Luminous" — A pair of researchers find a defect in mathematics, where an assertion (X) leads to a contradictory assertion (not X) after a long but finite series of steps. Using a powerful virtual computer made of light beams (Luminous), they are able to map and shape the boundary between the near-side and far-side mathematics, leading to a showdown with real consequences in the physical universe.
- "Mister Volition"
- "Cocoon"
- "Transition Dreams" — A man is informed that the mind uploading he plans to undergo is going to cause subjective experiences he is not going to remember.
- "Silver Fire" — An epidemiologist traces the incidents of a fatal but rare disease through the rural USA.
- "Reasons to Be Cheerful" — A boy discovers he has a serious brain tumor, which was causing him to be amazingly happy. With it removed, he becomes despondent, and undergoes a new and extensive treatment eventually, with a form of brain network, to try to get back to a more useful life many years later.
- "Our Lady of Chernobyl" — A man is hired to find a radioactive religious icon. The search turns deadly.
- "The Planck Dive" — Physicists about to undergo a one-way expedition into a black hole are visited by a stranger and his daughter.

== Critical reception ==
Writing in Vector Brian Stableford noted: "Egan's second story-collection, Luminous, is markedly better than his first. Axiomatic, and warrants comparison with such classic collections of Contes philosophiques as Jorge Luis Borges's Labyrinths and Primo Levi's The Sixth Day...This is the science fiction book of the year, and it should be on every sf lover's shelf...For good or ill, this is the shape of things to come."

In SF Commentary Bruce Gillespie noted: "Greg Egan has achieved an evenness of texture and consistency of accomplishment in these stories that makes it difficult to remember them separately. They so nearly add up to one Eganworld that it’s hard to differentiate between their viewpoints. I’ve given four stars to most of them, and particularly liked 'Transition Dreams', 'Silver Fire', 'Chaff', and "The Planck Dive"."
