= Silver Fire (novelette) =

1996 novelette by Greg Egan

- Short story by Greg Egan
- Country: Australia
- Language: English
- Genre: Science fiction

Publication
- Published in: Interzone
- Publication type: Periodical
- Publisher: TTA Press
- Media type: Print
- Publication date: December 1995

"Silver Fire" is a science fiction short story by Australian writer Greg Egan, first published in Interzone #102 in December 1995. The short story was included in the collections Luminous in 1998 and The Best of Greg Egan in 2019.

== Plot ==
A new disease known as Silver Fire, which causes a feeling of being burned alive, is spreading through the Midwestern United States. Clair chases after new cases and talks with multiple families about possible reasons how they could have been infected. She learns about a "Trail of Happiness" on which silver projections are shown during festivals. After a young man tries to persuade her to have intercourse and she rejects him, she learns that Silver Fire was intentionally spread for religious reasons to get people to walk the Trail of Happiness. Clair meets the young man from the Festival again with a dead woman in his car, who reveals himself to be among the people having spread Silver Fire. Clair sees just a fool in him, who fell for a few lies.

== Translation ==
The short story was translated into French by Francis Lustman and Quarante-Deux (1998), Italian (2001), Japanese by Makoto Yamagishi (2008), Spanish by Carlos Pavón (2010), Czech, Korean and Chinese.

== Reception ==
=== Reviews ===
Russell Letson, writing in the Locus Magazine, states that the short story "is a very strong example of Egan's interest in matters of disease and morality and his scornful attitude toward irrationality, sentimentality, and "the saccharine poison of spirituality".

Karen Burnham writes in Greg Egan (Masters of Modern Science Fiction) that the short story "overflows with vitriol for people who increase human suffering by shoehorning real things into an ideological framework and applying them willy-nilly".

=== Awards ===
"Silver Fire" reached the 20th place at the Locus Award for Best Novelette in 1996 as well as the 2nd place of Interzone Readers Poll in 1996.

== Literature ==
- Burnham, Karen (2014). Greg Egan (Modern Masters of Science Fiction). Modern Masters of Science Fiction. University of Illinois Press (published 2014-04-03). ISBN 978-0252038419.
