= Scale (novel) =

2023 novel by Greg Egan

- Author: Greg Egan
- Language: English
- Genre: Science fiction, Hard science fiction
- Publication date: 1 January 2023
- Pages: 272
- ISBN: 978-1922240439

Scale is a science-fiction novel by Australian author Greg Egan, published in 2023. The novel describes a world, in which matter is composed differently and causes humans to have several different sizes, as well as the frictions between them.

== Plot ==
In a world with matter being made up of eight different generations of leptons with each one having twice the mass of the previous one, humans have different sizes organized in seven scales and a Generation Eight currently under research. Every scale has twice the size of the next: hence Scale One, normal humans, are the largest and Scale Seven, about the size of Lego minifigurines, the smallest. They mostly segregate in districts, although cross-scale offspring can happen. Different scales bring unique problems; for example, the speed of thought and life expectancy being different, or molecules made up of matter of one scale not working for a different scale. Communication between scales is also difficult since it requires frequency modulation, but there is a universal language known as Panscala. Since for example body volume grows with the third power of the height, there are debates whether resources should be split according to a logarithmic or linear scale. All of that creates tension between the scales.

Sam Mujrif, a Scale Four detective, is tasked with finding Cara Leon, a Scale One woman, by her sister Jessica Leon. Prior to disappearing, Cara Leon had done trade with electronics in District Four and was also last seen there. Sam Mujrif eventually uncovers that Cara Leon had been kidnapped and made part of an experiment, that kept her underwater in a dome of Scale Seven metal, made with the new technology of lepton engineering. She is saved and reunited with her sister Jessica Leon with her claims hinting that she stumbled upon something she wasn't supposed to see in District Four. Shortly after, a giant blast resembling a nuclear explosion can be seen all over the different districts and first causes panic. It turns out that District Seven has launched the probe Friendship around the Earth and plans to colonize the Moon and Mars, explaining the experiment with Cara Leon. Although Friendship's orbit is synchronized with the sleep cycles in multiple districts and sends out signals for all scales to see, some people perceive it as a passive-aggressive demonstration of power. It furthermore turns out, that District Seven worked on advancing lepton engineering to be able to transfer genetic information between scales by translating the different analogues of atoms used in their biology into each other. Debates and then a vote are held on the technology, which yields neither victory for or against it, but instead a third option. Sam Mujrif's son tells him to soon going to study in the astronaut program of District Seven, which takes twenty-four students from each district, and not be worried about the common future of the scales.

== Background ==
In our universe, there are just three generations of leptons, which are electrons, muons (mu leptons) and tauons (tau leptons) with their masses also having different ratios. Muons are 207 times heavier than electrons and tauons are 3477 times heavier than electrons. Although matter with electrons replaced by muons and tauons can be created artificially, it is unstable since both muons and tauons decay. In Scale, the eight generations of stable leptons are fictional and not related to the Eightfold Way or the eight Gell-Mann matrices appearing in real particle physics. The ratios of their masses translates into ratios of their respective Bohr radii, which explains the different scales. More background with calculations is presented by Greg Egan on his website.

== Reviews ==
Alexandra Pierce wrote in Locus that "neither the scientific ideas nor the narrative are there to carry the other," making the novel "a genuinely thought-provoking story on both a political and a scientific level." She concludes that the novel is "rewarding, intriguing, and ultimately highly enjoyable, and while maybe I wouldn't suggest as your entry to Greg Egan's work, it's a marvellous example of how seemingly bizarre ideas can be turned into an excellent novel."
