= The Cutie =

1989 short story by Greg Egan

- Short story by Greg Egan
- Country: Australia
- Language: English
- Genre: Science fiction

Publication
- Published in: Interzone
- Publication type: Periodical
- Publisher: TTA Press
- Media type: Print
- Publication date: May/June 1989

"The Cutie" is a science-fiction short story by Australian writer Greg Egan, first published in Interzone #29 in May/June 1989. It was his first to be published in Interzone. The short story was included in the collection Axiomatic in 1995. It also appeared in the anthology Interzone: The 4th Anthology edited by John Clute, David Pringle and Simon Ounsley in 1989.

== Plot ==
A lonely man with a desperate wish to be a father undergoes a medical procedure to impregnate himself with a "Cutie", a child with reduced mental capacities (including the inability to speak), reduced legal status (regarded to be more like a pet) and a lifespan of only four years. When she unexpectedly succeeds to speak simple words, the man begins to form a stronger attachment to her and even unsuccessfully tries to postpone the early death integrated into her genetics. After her death, the mourning father is left wondering, whether her death would have meant this much to him if she never had attempted to speak at all.

== Translation ==
The short story was translated into French by Sylvie Denis and Francis Valéry (1997 and 2006), Hungarian by József Békési (1999), Romanian by Mihai-Dan Pavelescu (1999), Japanese by Makoto Yamagishi (1999), Italian by Riccardo Valla (2003) and Korean by Kim Sang-hoon (2024). The French translation appeared under the two different titles "Le Tout P’tit" and "Le P’tit-mignon".

== Background ==
Karen Burnham writes in Greg Egan (Modern Masters of Science Fiction), that the short story "really marked a turning point, establishing Egan’s presence as a pure SF writer." Egan, in an interview with Eidolon in 1993, told that "David Pringle did help steer me away from horror; when he bought ‘The Cutie’—my first SF story for Interzone—he made it clear that he thought I was heading in the right direction." Egan also stated in this interview, that the inspiration for the short story "was triggered by reading that childless adults in the US were buying themselves Cabbage Patch dolls - and that one couple had even had an exorcism performed on theirs." He added to be "still not sure if that was apocryphal or not."

== Reception ==
=== Reviews ===
Jon Evans, writing in the Reactor Magazine, claims that the short story "is one of the the [sic] most sentimental and emotional horror stories every [sic] written."

Karen Burnham writes in Greg Egan (Modern Masters of Science Fiction), that "as with several of Egan’s other early stories, the author’s hand is obviously tipping the scales, with a narrative that at times seems manipulated instead of flowing naturally." As examples, she notes that it is "difficult [....] to believe that there would be a market for semi-human babies who die young, or that a protagonist obsessed with child-nurturing would not simply adopt." She adds that "while this is a story that lightly hits some horror buttons, it is firmly on the side of near-future, bioethics-oriented SF."

=== Awards ===
The short story reached the 5th place in the Interzone Reader's Poll in 1990 and was nominated for the Seiun Award in 2000.

== Literature ==
- Burnham, Karen (2014). Greg Egan (Modern Masters of Science Fiction). University of Illinois Press (published April 3, 2014). ISBN 978-0252038419.
