= The Year's Best Science Fiction: Thirtieth Annual Collection =

2013 anthology edited by Gardner Dozois

- Editor: Gardner Dozois
- Cover artist: Michael Whelan
- Language: English
- Series: The Year's Best Science Fiction
- Genre: Science fiction
- Publisher: St. Martin's Press
- Publication date: July 23, 2013
- Publication place: United States
- Media type: Print (hardcover & trade paperback)
- Pages: xlii & 654 pp
- ISBN: 9781250028051
- OCLC: 838196524
- Preceded by: The Year's Best Science Fiction: Twenty-Ninth Annual Collection
- Followed by: The Year's Best Science Fiction: Thirty-First Annual Collection

The Year's Best Science Fiction: Thirtieth Annual Collection is a science fiction anthology edited by Gardner Dozois that was published on July 23, 2013. It is the 30th in The Year's Best Science Fiction series.

== Contents ==
The book includes 29 stories, all first published in 2012. The book also includes a summation by Dozois, a brief introduction by Dozois to each story, and a referenced list of honorable mentions for the year. The stories are as follows:

- Indrapramit Das: "Weep for Day"
- Paul McAuley: "The Man"
- Jay Lake: "The Stars Do Not Lie"
- Lavie Tidhar: "The Memcordist"
- Pat Cadigan: "The Girl-thing Who Went Out for Sushi"
- Eleanor Arnason: "Holmes Sherlock"
- Richard A. Lovett and William Gleason: "Nightfall on the Peak of Eternal Light"
- Andy Duncan: "Close Encounters"
- Lee Mandelo: "The Finite Canvas"
- Sean McMullen: "Steamgothic"
- Elizabeth Bear: "In the House of Aryaman, a Lonely Signal Burns"
- Paul McAuley: "Macy Minnot's Last Christmas on Dione, Ring Racing, Fiddler's Green, the Potter's Garden"
- Michael Bishop: "Twenty Lights to 'The Land of Snow'"
- Carrie Vaughn: "Astrophilia"
- Adam Roberts: "What Did Tessimond Tell You?"
- Megan Lindholm: "Old Paint"
- David Moles: "Chitai Heiki Koronbin"
- Robert Reed: "Katabasis"
- Alastair Reynolds: "The Water Thief"
- Linda Nagata: "Nightside on Callisto"
- Lavie Tidhar: "Under the Eaves"
- Steven Popkes: "Sudden, Broken, and Unexpected"
- Robert Charles Wilson: "Fireborn"
- Vandana Singh: "Ruminations in an Alien Tongue"
- Hannu Rajaniemi: "Tyche and the Ants"
- Sarah Monette and Elizabeth Bear: "The Wreck of the 'Charles Dexter Ward'"
- Christopher Barzak: "Invisible Men"
- Aliette de Bodard: "Ship's Brother"
- Robert Reed: "Eater-of-Bone"

== Release details ==
- 2013, United States, St. Martin's Press ISBN 978-1-250-02805-1, Pub date July 23, 2013, Hardcover
- 2013, United States, St. Martin's Griffin ISBN 978-1-250-02913-3, Pub date July 23, 2013, Trade paperback
- 2013, United States, St. Martin's Press ISBN 978-1-250-02804-4, Pub date July 23, 2013, e-book
