= Perihelion Summer =

2019 novella/novel by Greg Egan

- Author: Greg Egan
- Language: English
- Genre: Science fiction, Hard science fiction
- Publisher: Tor Books
- Publication date: 2019
- ISBN: 978-1250313782

Perihelion Summer is a science fiction novella/novel by Australian writer Greg Egan, published by Tor Books in 2019.

== Plot ==
Taraxippus, a double system of two black holes with the heavier one having one-tenth the mass of the sun, is discovered using gravitational lensing and observing its Einstein rings. It passes through the Solar System and shifts the orbits of the planets. Earth in particular is thrown onto a more elliptical orbit, making it roughly 10–15 degrees warmer at perihelion and correspondingly cooler at aphelion. Countries prepare, for example by enclosing entire cities under a glass dome or opening borders for refugees.

Matt and his friends build the Mandjet, a boat with a self-sustaining ecosystem to stay off land and potentially head to Antarctica. They meet other boats at sea, take people on board if needed, and form a flotilla together. Matt hears of a fire in his hometown Perth and heads back to save his parents and sister, who all previously deemed staying at sea to be too unsafe. He arrives one hour after his father died of a heart attack, which was fatal as he previously concealed his need for a hospital while the family fled Perth. He also learns that his mother blames him for it and even for Taraxippus, as he didn't stop talking about it. Matt brings his mother and sister to the Mandjet successfully, but learns it has been taken over by pirates. Together with his friends, they manage to regain control again. Matt is then forgiven by his mother.

== Reviews ==
Russell Letson writes in the Locus Magazine, that the novella "is certainly more than 'just a ride': a description of how wrong things can go and how fast, a hard-SF, procedural-didactic treatment that follows its disaster from causes through effects and responses, supported by the meticulously precise observations of processes one expects from this writer." He also adds that the "early chapters also sketch in the range of social and political reactions" and that "the rest of the book unpacks the implications of political pathologies and climatological disturbances as populations face or flee the deadly extremes of ice and fire." He further thinks that "Egan always insists on examining and unfolding the way the world works and the ways we interact with those operations", that the novella "also models the rational, the possible, the decent, and the humane in its picture, as though reluctant to give in to the most melodramatic options offered by the situation" and that Egan is "modeling both an accelerated version of the future we face and a perhaps-as-unlikely kind of response to it – a rational and humane refusal to give up or give in to survivalist power fantasies and magical thinking."

Kirkus Reviews called the story "more an appetizer than an entree" as well as "more than a novella yet less than a novel" and further wrote "In a series of quick, vivid sketches, Egan shows us how, for those aboard the Mandjet and their friends and relatives still on land, life—the entire planet—will change forever. As a metaphor representing global climate change, it's effective enough; more than 30 years ago, another Australian, George Turner, did something comparable in Drowning Towers. This lacks that book's weight and complexity, though it's certainly a noteworthy contribution to a debate whose implications Egan is content to leave to our imaginations."
