= Neighbourhood Watch (short story) =

1987 horror story by Greg Egan

- Short story by Greg Egan
- Country: Australia
- Language: English
- Genre: Horror

Publication
- Published in: Aphelion

"Neighbourhood Watch" is a horror short story by Australian writer Greg Egan. It was first published in the Australian magazine Aphelion in 1987, and reprinted in The Year's Best Horror Stories in 1988.

== Plot summary ==
In order to eliminate local crime, a town council signs a contract with a demon, intending that the demon devour anyone who breaks the law after 11pm.

== Reception ==
The Science Fiction Research Association called the story "outstanding", and said that by selecting the story to be published in The Year's Best Horror Stories and thereby bringing Egan's work to a wider audience, editor Karl Wagner could "be credited with at least one major 'discovery'."
