= Distress (novel) =

1995 novel by Greg Egan

- First edition (publ. Millennium)
- Author: Greg Egan
- Language: English
- Genre: Science fiction
- Publisher: George Bell and Sons
- Publication date: November 1995
- Publication place: Australia
- Media type: Print
- Pages: 306 pp.
- Awards: 1996 Aurealis Award for Best Science Fiction Novel

Distress is a 1995 science fiction novel by Australian writer Greg Egan.

== Plot summary ==
Distress describes the political intrigue surrounding a mid-twenty-first century physics conference, at which is to be presented a unified Theory of Everything. In the background of the story is an epidemic mental illness, related in some way to the imminent discovery of the TOE. The action takes place on an artificial island called "Stateless", which has earned the wrath of the world's large biotech companies for its pilfering of their intellectual property.

The narrator is a journalist for a science channel called SeeNet named Andrew Worth who carries video recording software in an intestinal implant. He is offered a story on a new illness called Distress, but declines. He journeys to Stateless through a series of convoluted flights to cover a presentation by 27-year-old South African physicist Violet Mosala, supplanting the preproduction by a colleague, Sarah Knight. When he arrives, he is informed by an asex anthrocosmologist named Akili that Violet's life is in danger. Violet is finishing her Theory of Everything, which she intends to present on the conference's last day.

Through interfacing with a talkative local, Worth learns that Violet plans to emigrate to Stateless after the conference to use her celebrity status to provide an opportunity for South Africa and other nations to end their support for the United Nations boycott of Stateless. He also witnesses the islands' physical underpinnings: it is basically held up by the activity of millions of micro-organisms. After meeting with a faction of anthrocosmologists, he learns that they believe in the concept that the universe is created by one person's Theory of Everything. That person is called the Keystone.

Worth becomes deathly ill and believes he has been infected with cholera by a faction of anthrocosmologists who wanted him to transmit the disease to Violet Mosala. He recovers and is kidnapped by this group, who are led by a rival physicist that Worth saw with Violet at the conference. Worth and Akili are held on a tanker where it is explained that these cultists believe Violet's TOE will destroy the world. Worth signals for help by connecting his implant to a port on the ship. He and Akili are rescued by citizens of Stateless.

Worth returns to the conference and learns that a biotech conglomerate sent a militia to Stateless, angry at the technology they have appropriated. He negotiates with the militia to let a suddenly ill Violet return to South Africa, where she dies. Before her illness, however, she tasked an AI to synthesize her final theory. The militia moves to take over the main city of Stateless, brutalizing the citizens as they evacuate to the outskirts. While seemingly helpless to do anything at first, they soon strike back at the invaders by having triggered microorganisms consume the cities structural underpinning, sinking it into the ocean. Worth is fired from SeeNet and Sarah Knight replaces him, covering the war. Worth discovers that Sarah was working with the cultists, and that AIs are exhibiting symptoms of the titular mental illness as well. Believing that the AI that wrote the paper became the Keystone and that Distress will continue until a human reads it, Worth downloads and reads the paper, and realizes that all minds, together, collaborate in being "the" Keystone, giving all of humanity an intuitive connection with the universe.

== Awards ==
- 1996 Aurealis Award for Best Science Fiction Novel, winner
- 1997 James Tiptree Jr Memorial Award, longlisted
