= Into Darkness (novelette) =

- Short story by Greg Egan
- Country: Australia
- Language: English
- Genre: Science fiction

Publication
- Published in: Asimov's Science Fiction
- Publication type: Periodical
- Publisher: TTA Press
- Media type: Print
- Publication date: January 1992

"Into Darkness" is a science-fiction novelette by Australian writer Greg Egan, first published in Asimov's Science Fiction in January 1992. The novelette was included in the collections Axiomatic in 1995 and The Best of Greg Egan in 2019.

== Plot ==
A strange wormhole is randomly jumping around on the surface of the Earth, but seems to be drawn to crowded areas. No reason for its sudden appearance is known, but some assume it to be an experiment by aliens from the future to get into the past with both ends of the wormhole accidentally collapsing towards their common barycenter in spacetime. The wormhole is composed of two shells, the outer with a radius of one kilometer being called "The Intake" and the inner one with a radius of two hundred meters being called "The Core". Going over "The Intake" forces macroscopic objects like people (with microscopic exceptions like the flow of blood possible) to only travel further towards "The Core", which allows to leave the wormhole. Every living being inside it during the moment of jump to a new place is killed. Like radioactive nuclei, the duration of the stay of the wormhole at a certain place follows the mathematical law of a half-time of eighteen minutes. The short story follows John Nately, a high-school science teacher, on his eleventh journey from "The Intake" to "The Core", who again risks his life to save those of others.

== Translation ==
The novelette was translated into Czech by Blanka Vykoukalová and Petr Kotrle (1997), Hungarian by József Békési (1999), Romanian by Mihai-Dan Pavelescu, Japanese by Makoto Yamagishi (2000), Spanish by Luis G. Prado (2002), Italian (2003), Spanish (2006), French by Francis Lustman and Quarante-Deux (2006), Chinese (2023) and Korean by Kim Sang-hoon (2024).

== Reception ==
=== Reviews ===
Russell Letson, writing in the Locus Magazine, claims that "the story framework is a tense and effective physical adventure, while at the same time the narrator recognizes the metaphorical properties of the space he is traversing."

Karen Burnham writes in Greg Egan (Masters of Science Fiction), that the short story is "a pure puzzle-solving story."

=== Awards ===
The novelette was a Locus Award Nominee for Best SF Novelette in 1993 and reached the 5th place. It also reached the 2nd place of Asimov's Reader Poll in 1993.

== Literature ==
- Burnham, Karen (2014). Greg Egan (Modern Masters of Science Fiction). Modern Masters of Science Fiction. University of Illinois Press (published 2014-04-03). ISBN 978-0252038419.
