= TAP (novelette) =

1995 novelette by Greg Egan

- Short story by Greg Egan
- Country: Australia
- Language: English
- Genre: Science fiction

Publication
- Published in: Asimov's Science Fiction
- Publication type: Periodical
- Media type: Print
- Publication date: September 1995

"TAP" is a 1995 science fiction novelette by Australian writer Greg Egan.

== Synopsis ==
The story is set in a near-future society in which brain implants allow immersive virtual reality. The implants also allow a new kind of language called TAP, Total Affective Protocol. TAP is essentially a way of making qualia into words.

TAP words can be read like English, or invoked to be experienced, like virtual reality.

== Reception ==
"TAP" was a finalist for the 1996 Hugo Award for Best Novelette.
