= Axiomatic (short story) =

1990 short story by Greg Egan

- Short story by Greg Egan
- Country: Australia
- Language: English
- Genre: Science fiction

Publication
- Published in: Interzone
- Publication type: Periodical
- Publisher: TTA Press
- Media type: Print
- Publication date: November 1990

"Axiomatic" is a science-fiction short story by Australian writer Greg Egan, first published in Interzone 41 in November 1990. The short story was included in the collection The Best of Greg Egan in 2020.

== Plot ==
Analogous to the axioms of arithmetic and geometry, which are postulates creating a mathematical system, and cannot be questioned within that system, an axiomatic implant can alter a belief in the brain, for example to change religion or sexuality. This does not contradict free will, as an axiomatic can be added or removed by choice and people can freely choose how to live with their new belief.

Mark Carver illegally buys an axiomatic implant to block his moral and ethical beliefs concerning murder for three days, during which he shoots Anderson, the murderer of his wife Amy. While doing so, he is overwhelmed by the pure certainty having replaced all his conflicting emotions and later seeks to gain it again by using another axiomatic to convince himself that the deaths of Amy and Anderson were totally meaningless.

== Reception ==
=== Reviews ===
Karen Burnham, writing in the New York Review of Science Fiction, concludes after a discussion of the short stories "Axiomatic", "Mister Volition" and "Singleton", that "not everyone is as sanguine about the continuity of consciousness when making the transition to substances other than our organic brains nor so worried about the moral implications of the many-worlds interpretation of quantum physics." She claims that "Egan’s stories show a continuity of concern about these subjects that refuses superficial answers and instead examines them in depth." Writing in Strange Horizons, Burnham says that "the ending is tragically just, in a twisted way. “

=== Awards ===
The short story was nominated for the British SF Association Award in 1991 (as was "Learning to Be Me", another of Egan's short stories). It reached the 11th place in the Reader Poll of the Locus Award in 1991 and the 2nd place in the Interzone Readers Poll in 1991.

== Adaptions ==
The production of a short film inspired by the short story commenced in 2015, and the film was released online in October 2017.
