= Zendegi =

2010 novel by Greg Egan

- First UK edition cover
- Author: Greg Egan
- Language: English
- Genre: Science fiction
- Publisher: Gollancz
- Publication date: June 2010
- Publication place: United Kingdom
- Media type: Print (hardcover)
- Pages: 332
- ISBN: 978-0-575-08617-3

Zendegi is a science fiction novel by Australian author Greg Egan, first published in the United Kingdom by Gollancz in June 2010. It is set in Iran in the near future and deals with mapping the human brain, virtual reality and the liberalization of Iran. The title of the book means "life" in Persian; the name of the virtual reality system featured in the story is Zendegi-ye Behtar (زندگی بهتر), Persian for "better life".

Zendegi was shortlisted for the 2011 Locus Award for Best Science Fiction Novel. It was translated into French by Pierre-Paul Durastanti and published in France by Le Bélial' in March 2012.

== Plot summary ==
=== Part 1: 2012 ===
Martin Seymour is an Australian news correspondent in Iran covering the 2012 Iranian parliamentary elections. The elections turn out to be a sham as many of the opposition candidates are banned, but Martin remains in Iran to cover the post election protests. Unrest escalates and the authorities are forced to hold free elections.

Nasim Golestani is an Iranian computer scientist living in exile in the United States following the execution of her father by VEVAK, the Iranian secret police. She works at MIT on the Human Connectome Project (HCP), which is attempting to produce a neural map of the human brain. She develops computer software that simulates zebra finch song production by using thousands of finch brain scans. But when Congress turns down funding for the project, Nasim returns to Iran to help rebuild her country.

=== Part 2: 2027–2028 ===
The story moves to a liberalized Iran in 2027. Martin lives in Tehran with Mahnoosh, an Iranian political activist he married, and their six-year-old son, Javeed. Nasim heads a company in Tehran that has developed Zendegi-ye Behtar, an online multi-player virtual reality (VR) gaming platform. Zendegi uses cloud computing to run its operations across several countries. But Zendegi has to compete with several other VR providers, and Nasim looks for something new to add to Zendegi to give it an edge.

Nasim learns that HCP finally took off in the US and has published its first draft brain map based on thousands of brain scans of human organ donors. She discovers that her contributions were not used by the project – HCP's goals were aimed at helping neurologists diagnose pathologies, whereas her goal was to simulate the brain. Nasim decides to continue what she had started on HCP using the project's publicly available brain scans. Her goal is to improve the realism of Zendegi's proxies, computer-generated people that flesh-out the VR's landscape. She takes this a step further and starts taking MRI brain scans of living people. Nasim's first breakthrough comes with Virtual Azimi, a proxy she creates by scanning Ashkan Azimi, Iran's national football team captain, to record his motor skills while he replays games in his head. Virtual Azimi enables football fans to play games with Azimi's proxy, and it is a huge success, boosting Zendegi's popularity.

Javeed loves Zendegi and Martin often takes him to local gaming booths where together they participate in role-playing games. One day Mahnoosh is killed in a car accident, and Martin has to raise Javeed on his own. Then Martin discovers he has terminal cancer, and concerned that Javeed will grow up without a father, he contacts Nasim and asks her to create a Virtual Martin that Javeed can communicate with in Zendegi. Nasim conducts MRI scans on Martin while prompting him with images and memories. But Zendegi comes under fire from religious fanatics. Iranian clerics denounce Virtual Azimi as "an afront to God and human dignity". It is also criticized by the Cis-Humanist League (CHL), a human rights group who object to enslaved proxies, saying that "it's unethical to create conscious software that lacks the ability to control its own destiny".

Nasim continues developing Virtual Martin in secret. While she knows that Virtual Azimi has no consciousnesses, she is not sure what Martin's proxy is turning into. Meanwhile, Martin's health is deteriorating and she sets up a VR session for him to evaluate the current state of his proxy. Martin enters Zendegi using Javeed's avatar, making Virtual Martin think he is talking to his son, but the proxy overreacts to Javeed's (Martin's) behaviour and this upsets Martin. After Martin dies, Nasim has second thoughts about what she is doing. The Virtual Martin she has created from fragments of Martin's brain is far from human. She realises that CHL are right: to upload a complete person into VR to achieve immortality is a noble goal, but "to squeeze some abridged, mutilated person through the first available aperture [i]s not".

== Background ==
Egan began writing Zendegi in early 2008. Early drafts of the novel based the fictional unrest in Iran on actual reports of previous protests in the country. To gather more information, Egan spent two weeks in Iran in October 2008, his first trip outside of Australia. His interest in the country stemmed from contact he had had with Iranian refugees in Australia.

Egan applied for his Iranian visa in June 2008, and in August that year he learnt that a synopsis of the novel that he had sent to his publisher, which included mention of the overthrow of the Iranian regime, had been leaked. Egan's concern was if Iran picked it up, they might deny him a visa, or worse, arrest him in Iran. Fortunately for Egan, only a few sites had published it, and his publisher was quick to put out an official, less revealing summary. During his stay in Iran, when he fleshed out the details of the government's downfall, the country was quiet, but in June the following year it erupted in turmoil after that month's presidential elections.

== Reception ==
American novelist David Maine in a review of Zendegi on the webzine PopMatters praised Egan for "boldly going where few SF writers have gone before—namely, into the street demos and sitting rooms of near-future Tehran". Maine said that while a science fiction story set in the Middle East is not unusual, Zendegi and Iran "take on a particular resonance" that makes "perfect thematic sense". He said that the novel is "well written, smartly paced and ... thought-provoking", and "pushes the boundaries of what is commonly called 'science fiction'".

Locus magazine's review of the book said that the novel centres around the possibilities and limits of technology, and fills the gap between "can-we and should-we". Egan's depictions of life in a 21st-century Iran are appealing, and "when he turns his attention to ordinary humans, living in a world that is just around the corner from our own, he will break your heart".

A reviewer at ScienceFiction.com said that while the novel is well researched and the depictions of Zendegi's virtual reality is "detailed and compelling", he felt that many of the book's characters are "pretty unpleasant": Martin is "self-righteous", and Nasim is too ordinary and a push-over. He also felt that Egan's statement "If you want to make it human, make it whole" is "both too restrictive and too woolly", and said that had Egan chosen to take on the storm of protest technology like Zendegi would have generated, instead of "just say[ing] no", he would have produced a better novel.

British science fiction magazine SFX dismissed Zendegi as "boring", saying that the mood of the book is "strangely diffident: themes tail off, confrontations are dodged, ambitions are deflated, breakthroughs happen to other people". The review said that Egan's "once-mighty imaginative muscles have atrophied during his long break from writing".

A reviewer in Strange Horizons described Zendegi as "a little more 'human'" than Egan's previous books. He said that Egan's speculation on the ethical impact of mind uploading technologies is "sometimes quite moving", and that while the novel focuses on the quest of preserving humans digitally, it is also "a powerful meditation on loss" when "quasi-Frankenstein-like" "fragmented consciousness" are created. The first part of the book dealing with the post-election unrest in Iran is "wonderfully rich in detail", and that overall Zendegi is "a well-grounded analysis of some important contemporary trends".

SciFiNow magazine said that Egan, renowned for his hard science fiction, pushes the science in this novel to the background and brings its characters, their experiences and the world they live in to the front. He tells a "very human story" set in a "brilliantly realised" Iran in the near future. The book displays a respect and understanding of Iranian culture that came from Egan's extensive research into the subject. The magazine said that Zendegi was "generally well written", and that its "ideas and narrative come together for a fantastic emotional and intellectual payoff that is as mature as it is heart-rending – making it all worthwhile".

== Publication history ==
- Egan, Greg (June 2010). Zendegi (hardback) (UK ed.). Victor Gollancz Ltd. ISBN 978-0-575-08617-3.
- Egan, Greg (June 2010). Zendegi (paperback) (UK ed.). Victor Gollancz Ltd. ISBN 978-0-575-08618-0.
- Egan, Greg (June 2010). Zendegi (ebook) (UK ed.). Victor Gollancz Ltd.
- Egan, Greg (September 2010). Zendegi (hardback) (US ed.). Night Shade Books. ISBN 978-1-59780-174-4.
- Egan, Greg (September 2010). Zendegi (ebook) (UK ed.). Night Shade Books.
- Egan, Greg (May 2011). Zendegi (paperback) (US ed.). Night Shade Books. ISBN 978-1-59780-175-1.
- Egan, Greg (July 2011). Zendegi (paperback) (UK ed.). Victor Gollancz Ltd. ISBN 978-0-575-08620-3.

Source: FantasticFiction.

== Sources ==
- Egan, Greg (2011a) [2010]. Zendegi (paperback) (UK ed.). Victor Gollancz Ltd. ISBN 978-0-575-08620-3.
