= Learning to Be Me =

1990 short story by Greg Egan

- Short story by Greg Egan
- Country: Australia
- Language: English
- Genre: Science fiction

Publication
- Published in: Interzone
- Publication type: Periodical
- Publisher: TTA Press
- Media type: Print
- Publication date: July 1990

"Learning to Be Me" is a science-fiction short story by Australian writer Greg Egan, first published in Interzone 37 in July of 1990. The short story was included in the collections Axiomatic in 1995 and The Best of Greg Egan in 2019.

== Plot ==
In the future, every human gets the Ndoli Device (commonly also called "jewel") implanted into their brain. It maps every single one of their thoughts and actions to fully copy their consciousness, hence learning to be them. The brain's sensory inputs are copied to the jewel, and the jewel, which is a sort of neural network, is trained to produce the same outputs as the brain. At a freely chosen time, typically when people reach their twenties and their brain is at its height, people go through a surgical operation where the jewel's outputs are connected to the rest of the body and replace those of the brain, therefore taking control of the body. Soon after, the biological brain is removed and destroyed. Unlike biological brains, the jewel is very durable, and can last for a billion years. While many people view the swap as being totally unproblematic and claim to still be themselves afterwards, some fear the swap resulting in their death and the jewel only being able to perfectly fake them.

The protagonist agrees with his wife Daphne to go through the swap together, but then escapes in the last minute due to fear, and doesn't return for a full year. Daphne files for divorce and writes him a letter about how easy the swap was, after which the protagonist seeks advice from a psychologist, who hasn't gone through the swap herself and doesn't plan to for the rest of her life. The protagonist decides once again to go through the swap. But two months before the operation, the device that ensures the training of the jewel and its synchronization with the biological brain malfunctions. Panicked, the protagonist realizes that he can no longer control any part of the body, and concludes that he is the jewel, not the biological brain. Unaware of this, the biological brain goes through with the swap, effectively killing itself, and the jewel finally gains control and attains immortality.

== Translation ==
The short story was translated into Italian (1993), Japanese (1995), French (1995), German (2002) and Spanish (2006).

== Background ==
The Ndoli Device/jewel also appears in the short stories "Closer" (1992) and "Border Guards" (1999) by Greg Egan.

== Reception ==
Karen Burnham, writing in the New York Review of Science Fiction, considers the short story to be an "instant classic". In Greg Egan (Masters of Science Fiction), Burnham calls it "one of his most important stories" and that it "is critically concerned with identity and how it may be maintained (or not) when transforming into an immortal, digital consciousness".

Salik Shah, writing in the Reactor Magazine, states that "there are concepts like ego and identity attached to the organic supercomputer that is our brain" and that "science fiction puts the reader in an uncomfortable situation, forcing us to experience the characters’ internal and external struggles." He adds that "by the end of these journeys, we become them or unlike them", and that "if the jewel comes with the promise of youth and longevity", then he will "sign up for the upgrade (minus the existential crises) any day".

== Literature ==
- Burnham, Karen (2014). Greg Egan (Modern Masters of Science Fiction). University of Illinois Press (published April 3, 2014). ISBN 978-0252038419.
