= This Is Not the Way Home (short story) =

2019 short story by Greg Egan

"This Is Not The Way Home"
- Short story by Greg Egan
- Country: Australia
- Language: English
- Genre: Science fiction

Publication
- Published in: Mission Critical
- Media type: Print
- Publication date: 2019

"This Is Not the Way Home" is a science-fiction short story by Australian writer Greg Egan, first published in the anthology Mission Critical edited by Jonathan Strahan in 2019. It describes a rescue mission from the moon using a sky hook in lunar orbit. The short story also appeared in the anthologies The Year’s Top Hard Science Fiction Stories 4 edited by Allan Kaster in 2020 and The Year’s Best Science Fiction Volume 1 edited by Jonathan Strahan in 2020 as well as the collection Sleep and the Soul in 2023. This Is Not the Way Home is also the title of the second studio album by Australian indie rock band The Cruel Sea from 1991, which might have been the inspiration for the title.

== Plot ==
Aisha, who since childhood had dreamed about becoming an astronaut, and her husband Gianni win a honeymoon on a Chinese moon base. While they are on the Moon, every contact with Earth breaks, with a conflict between the United States and China being suspected, which would mean no further mission rescuing them. Shuttles are not available for everyone and Gianni dies when the crew evacuates. Aisha, now stranded on the moon, becomes aware she is pregnant. She devises a plan to use a skyhook in lunar orbit to launch a vehicle back to Earth, and then gently sings for her baby.

== Reception ==
=== Reviews ===
James Wallace Harris wrote on classicsofsciencefiction.com, that it "reminded [him] of The Martian, but more than that it reminded [him] of Kip Russell and Heinlein’s Have Space Suit-Will Travel", even though "Egan didn’t quite make Aisha’s efforts as compelling." Nonetheless, he liked it "a whole lot better than many of the stories [...] in Asimov’s and Analog." He adds, that he "didn’t realize Jingyi was dead or had committed suicide because of the way it was visually described. Describing what a character sees doesn’t always get interpreted correctly." But a "reread [of] the story it all made perfect sense, but not with the first reading." In summary, "Egan sets up an intriguing problem for his story but disappoints [...] for two reasons," which are that "there were just too many lucky breaks lining up one after the other to be believable" and that "we never found out why the moonbase lost contact with Earth."

Russell Letson wrote in the Locus Magazine, that the short story is an "ingenious escape" and that "their rocketless voyage is given a detailed description."

=== Awards ===
"This is Not the Way Home" was nominated for the Japanese Seiun Award in 2021.
