= 3-torus =

Cartesian product of 3 circles

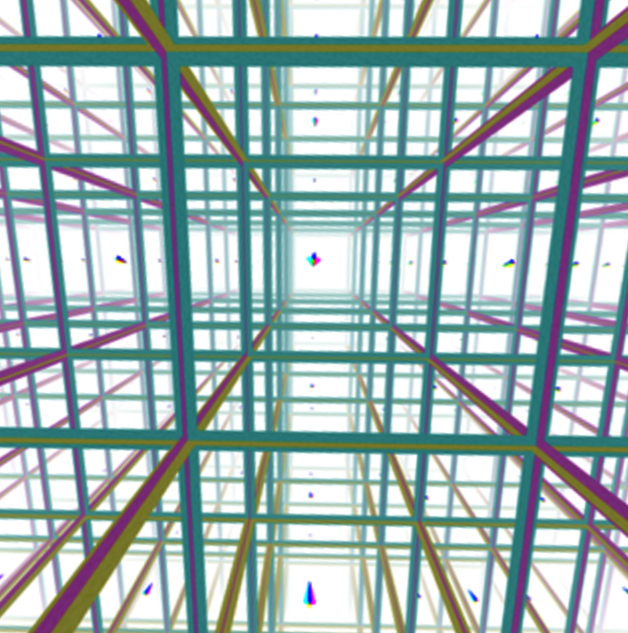
A view from inside a 3-torus. All of the cubes in the image are the same cube, since light in the manifold wraps around into closed loops.

The three-dimensional torus, or 3-torus, is defined as any topological space that is homeomorphic to the Cartesian product of three circles, $\mathbb{T}^3 = S^1 \times S^1 \times S^1.$ In contrast, the usual torus is the Cartesian product of only two circles.

== Description ==
The 3-torus is a three-dimensional compact manifold with no boundary. It can be obtained by "gluing" the three pairs of opposite faces of a cube, where being "glued" can be intuitively understood to mean that when a particle moving in the interior of the cube reaches a point on a face, it goes through it and appears to come forth from the corresponding point on the opposite face, producing periodic boundary conditions. Gluing only one pair of opposite faces produces a solid torus while gluing two of these pairs produces the solid space between two nested tori.

== Usage ==
In 1984, Alexei Starobinsky and Yakov Zeldovich at the Landau Institute in Moscow proposed a cosmological model where the shape of the universe is a 3-torus.
