= Quarantine (Egan novel) =

1992 novel by Greg Egan

- Author: Greg Egan
- Genre: Hard science fiction
- Publisher: Legend
- Publication date: 1992
- Pages: 280pp
- ISBN: 978-0-06-105423-5
- OCLC: 31758484

Quarantine is a 1992 hard science fiction novel by Greg Egan. Within a detective fiction framework, the novel explores the consequences of the Copenhagen interpretation of quantum mechanics (or rather of its consciousness causes collapse variant), which Egan acknowledges was chosen more for its entertainment value than for its likelihood of being correct.

== Plot summary ==
The novel is set in the near future (2034–2080), after the Solar System has been surrounded by an impenetrable shield known as the Bubble, presumably by an extraterrestrial civilization for unknown reasons. The Bubble permits no light to enter the Solar System, and as a consequence the stars can no longer be seen, causing widespread societal panic, 'claustrophobia', and terrorist action. Neural mods are commonplace, designed pathways in the brain that are created with engineered, programmable microorganisms to produce a variety of effects, such as implanting skillsets, emotions, altered states of awareness or, illegally, forcing and controlling thoughts.

The narrator, Nick, contains a suite of tactical mods that allow him to suppress emotions and enhance tactical and analytical thought. Nick is a private eye forced to quit the police force after the death of his wife, the trauma of which caused him to activate his emotional suppression mod, which further prompted him to purchase a mod that simulates the feeling of love and wellbeing of his wife still being alive, logically solving the problem of grief.

Nick accepts a case to investigate Laura, a woman who has vanished from a psychiatric institute, after several instances of her escaping. The institute staff insist that short of walking through a wall, it should not have been possible to escape the previous times, though it comes to light that she was kidnapped in this instance.

Investigation in New Hong Kong leads Nick to the group responsible, the Ensemble, but causes him to be captured. Nick is implanted with an illegal 'Loyalty Mod', which causes him to earnestly and truly believe in the goals of the Ensemble. Nick is used as a security guard for the project the Ensemble is working on, a new neural mod perfected by studying Laura. This mod, called the Eigenstate Mod or 'Eigenmod', allows the brain to consciously control the physical process that is responsible for wave function collapse. This feature of neurology is present in several animal species, and one of the researchers responsible for the mod, Po-kwai, suspects that the Bubble may exist because humanity may have been aggressively collapsing the wave functions of alien civilizations that did not have the ability to do so, causing them harm. When using the mod, the user becomes 'Smeared', existing within a superposition of states constantly, therefore every possible set of actions they take being equally 'real'. When one version of the user succeeds in whatever they want to do, they deactivate the mod, collapsing the eigenstates into that one subjective reality. This allows the mod to seemingly control probability to do anything, though raises questions of morality and philosophy to the narrator, who considers deactivating the mod equivalent to murdering the other equally real versions of the user.

Nick eventually meets a group of Ensemble members who like him are under the control of the Loyalty mod. They explain to him that the loyalty mod only specifies their loyalty to the Ensemble, but fails to specify what the Ensemble actually is. Therefore, via logical argument, the group (calling itself the Canon) decides that as by definition the most loyal members of the Ensemble, what the Ensemble is is up to their personal interpretations.

The Canon has Nick steal and apply the eigenstate mod to himself, which he uses for various purposes before eventually meeting with a strangely coherent Laura after bypassing otherwise impregnable security with the mod. Laura explains that she is naturally capable of smearing, and that she is one of the aliens who created the Bubble. The true alien consists of an emergent being composed of all the eigenstates of Laura at once, that dies when she stops smearing, but captures a holographic representation of itself within her mind that rebuilds the alien mind when she begins smearing again. Laura explains that life on earth developed the ability to collapse wave functions by chance, which eventually spread via pure natural selection. As smeared intelligence cannot survive in a single, unique state of the universe, they erected the bubble, preventing humanity from seeing and thus deciding the state of anything outside it, while simultaneously protecting humanity from the starkly alien nature of outside reality. Laura finishes by explaining her role as an observer, there to offer humanity a way to join the rest of the universe, if they choose to. She also warns Nick of his Smeared self, which she describes as a child and unsure of its abilities, but which is becoming increasingly aware that its goals do not align with that of Nick's, who she describes as a single cell to a much larger, complex and much more alien Smeared Nick.

A member of the canon uses the stolen eigenstate mod to cheat the production of engineered microbes that can install the mod into people, while also acting and spreading like a disease would, so that he may spread the ability to smear to humanity and join the aliens in smeared reality. Nick attempts to stop the release of the plague but is unsuccessful. Not long after, New Hong Kong begins to be filled with strange and impossible events, people changing faces, turning to glass or vanishing while holograms become real and the sky begins to rain blood. Nick finds Po-kwai, and both affirm that while they are not precisely scared of what is coming, they are not ready for such an existence. Po-kwai postulates that this outcome was inevitable and not the fault of smeared Nick—that instead the smeared total of all of humanity tunneled into possibility. Humans around them begin to blur as the smeared minds begin to increase in complexity. Both watch as stars begin to appear in the sky until it is filled with blinding white light.

In the epilogue, Nick resides in a refugee camp outside of New Hong Kong, the disease apparently only spreading within the city before stopping, but not before causing massive damage and leaving millions dead, often in gruesome and fantastical ways. The only difference for Nick being that his Loyalty mod and the mod simulating love for his wife have been permanently removed, with Nick finding the idea of embracing artificial satisfaction disgusting despite his newfound grief. It is left unclear if the Bubble still exists. Nick and Po-kwai part ways, confused as to why smeared humanity, after going through the trouble of coming to exist, would interact with reality outside the bubble and recoil. Nick initially believes that smeared humanity found the world outside the bubble distasteful, causing them to suicide into a single unique eigenstate again. He begins to suspect though that humanity has in fact smeared and joined the universe, and that he is merely one possibility out of infinite miracles and infinite suffering, his perceived reality being but one tiny aspect of his emergent, smeared self. Nick tries to come to terms with this, lying awake at night contemplating it till he finally falls asleep.

== Publication history ==
After the novel's initial publication in Australia in 1992 by Legend, it was reprinted as follows:

- 1995, HarperPrism, USA
- 1999, Millenium, UK
- 2008 Gollancz, UK

The novel was also translated into German in 1993, Romanian in 1996, Russian in 1997, Hungarian and Italian in 1998, Spanish and Japanese in 1999, French in 2000, Czech, Hebrew and Lithuanian in 2002, and Polish in 2006.

== Critical reception ==
In The Sydney Morning Herald Van Ikin called it the "fastest-moving Australian sf novel yet", and continued: "And as a work of literature? Controversy! Traditional humanism might find Quarantine hollow and soulless claiming that it merrily surrenders to the allure of glamorous gadgetry ... but the novel counter-answers (somewhat glibly) that life has never amounted to much and it matters little whether you place your trust in cherished values or the latest mod program So you can place Egan as a future-wise Robbe-Grillet or a spectacle-conscious Spielberg..."

Writing in SF Commentary Colin Steele noted: "Where the problem resides is with the overall structure. Egan's longer second half almost needs a knowledge of quantum mechanics in order to follow its metaphysical explanations and conjectures. A denouement that is almost of Ballardian (J. G.) hallucinatory dimensions adds up to a work of staggering imagination but flawed incompleteness. Once Egan harnesses the tightness of his award-winning short stories to the novel structure, there will be few to equal him in the realms of imaginative fiction."

It was also reviewed by Konrad Walewski for Nowa Fantastyka (8/2006).
