= Schild's Ladder =

2002 science fiction novel by Australian author Greg Egan

- First edition cover
- Author: Greg Egan
- Language: English
- Genre: Science fiction
- Publisher: Gollancz
- Publication date: 2002
- Publication place: Australia
- Media type: Print (Hardback & Paperback), eBook (Amazon Kindle, others out of print)
- Pages: 249 pp.
- ISBN: 0-575-07068-4
- OCLC: 60664155

Schild's Ladder is a 2002 science fiction novel by Australian author Greg Egan. The book derives its name from Schild's ladder, a construction in differential geometry, devised by the mathematician and physicist Alfred Schild.

== Plot summary ==
Twenty thousand years in the future, Cass, a humanoid physicist from Earth, travels to an orbital station in the vicinity of the star Mimosa, and begins a series of experiments to test the extremities of the "Sarumpaet rules"—a set of fundamental equations in "Quantum Graph Theory", which holds that physical existence can be precisely modelled by complex constructions of mathematical graphs. However, the experiments unexpectedly create a bubble of something more stable than ordinary vacuum, dubbed "novo-vacuum", that expands outward at half the speed of light as ordinary vacuum collapses to this new state at the border, hinting at more general laws beyond the Sarumpaet rules. The local population is forced to flee to ever more distant star systems to escape the steadily approaching border, but since the expansion never slows, it is just a matter of time before the novo-vacuum encompasses any given region within the Local Group. Two factions develop as the bubble expands: the Preservationists, who wish to stop the expansion and preserve the Milky Way at any cost; and the Yielders, who consider the novo-vacuum to be too important a discovery to destroy without understanding.

Six hundred years after the initial experiment, a vessel called the Rindler matches velocities with an ever-expanding novo-vacuum region at the border, powered by multispectral light emitted as the ordinary vacuum collapses into its lower energy-state. A variety of refugees probe the novo-vacuum in order to understand the physics that makes it possible. The novo-vacuum turns out to be more complicated than anyone had suspected, with a whole ordered universe existing within the zone of apparent chaos as direct elaborations of the quantum graph's lattice structure, of which elementary particles, fundamental interactions, and regular spacetime itself are only special cases.

The novo-vacuum's exotic geometry is ultimately revealed to contain living organisms and even civilizations, with an ecosystem based on "vendeks", microbe-like complexes of quantum graph structures only 10^{−33} meters across. Agglomerations of vendeks form "xennobes", analogous to multicellular organisms but only 10^{−27} meters across. This discovery greatly increases the importance of the Yielders' mission, since destroying the novo-vacuum would be tantamount to genocide, and a solution must be found to the metastability of the novo-vacuum's border region within spacetime.

== Background ==
Quantum Graph Theory (QGT) is a fictional improvement of the real theory of Loop Quantum Gravity (LQG), with quantum graphs in the former being fictional improvements of spin networks in the latter. In 2000, Egan published the essay "Only Connect" describing how the Javanese mathematician Kusnanto Sarumpaet had shown it to unify General relativity and the Standard Model in six papers from 2035 to 2038 and how computer simulations in 2043 and the Orbital Accelerator Facility in 2049 had experimentally verified his work. In 2002, Egan co-authored two papers about Riemannian 10j symbols, spin networks appearing in Riemannian quantum gravity, together with John Baez and Dan Christensen.

== See also ==
- Quantum graph
- "Singleton"
