= Salik Shah =

Salik Shah is an entrepreneur, poet, writer, editor and publisher based out of New Delhi, India. He is the founding editor and publisher of Mithila Review, a journal of international science fiction and fantasy established in 2015.

His poetry, fiction, and non-fiction has appeared in Asimov’s Science Fiction, Strange Horizons, Juggernaut Books, Star*Line, Coldnoon, Eye to the Telescope, Locus Magazine, among other publications.

One of his short stories "Lakhen & Dragonflies" appears in a course syllabus at SOAS University of London. His debut poetry collection "Khas Pidgin" won an Elgin Award nomination from Science Fiction & Fantasy Poetry Association in 2018. His poetry and fiction has also been nominated for Kumaon Literary Festival’s Fellows of Nature and Toto Awards.

His interviews have appeared in a number of publications including Hindustan Times, The Juggernaut, and Samovar. He has also interviewed several Hugo-winning authors for Mithila Review, including Cixin Liu, Ken Liu and Kij Johnson. He has also interviewed award-winning speculative and horror authors Glen Hirshberg, Lavie Tidhar and Usman T Malik.

He is a founding member of Plurality University (Paris), a Future of India Fellow, and The Seasteading Institute Ambassador to India.

A former advertising professional, he passed out of Film and Television Institute of India in 2009.

He grew up in Kathmandu and New Delhi, and can read, write, translate, and speak in Hindi, English, and Nepali.
