= Greg Egan =

Australian science fiction author and mathematician

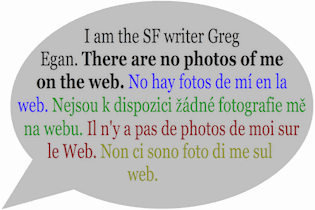
- Infographic from Greg Egan’s web site stating that he appears in no photos on the web
- Born: Gregory Mark Egan; 20 August 1961 (age 65); Perth, Western Australia, Australia
- Occupations: Writer, former programmer
- Writing career
- Period: 1983–present (as a science fiction writer)
- Genre: Science fiction
- Website: www.gregegan.net

Greg Egan (born 20 August 1961) is an Australian science fiction writer and mathematician, best known for his works of hard science fiction. Egan has won multiple awards including the John W. Campbell Memorial Award, the Hugo Award, and the Locus Award.

== Life and work ==
Egan holds a Bachelor of Science degree in mathematics from the University of Western Australia.

He published his first work in 1983. He specialises in hard science fiction stories with mathematical and quantum ontology themes, including the nature of consciousness. Other themes include genetics, simulated reality, posthumanism, mind uploading, sexuality, artificial intelligence, and the superiority of rational naturalism to religion. He often deals with complex technical material, like new physics and epistemology. He is a Hugo Award winner (with eight other works shortlisted for the Hugos) and has also won the John W. Campbell Memorial Award for Best Science Fiction Novel. His early stories feature strong elements of supernatural horror.

Egan's short stories have been published in a variety of genre magazines, including regular appearances in Interzone and Asimov's Science Fiction.

=== Mathematics ===
In 2002, Egan co-authored two papers about Riemannian 10j symbols, spin networks appearing in Riemannian quantum gravity, together with John Baez and Dan Christensen. Spin networks also play a central role in his novel Schild's Ladder released the same year.

In 2014, Egan conjectured a generalization of the Grace–Danielsson inequality about the relation of the radii of two spheres and the distance of their respective centres to fit a simplex between them to also hold in higher dimensions, which later became known as the Egan conjecture. A proof of the inequality being sufficient was published by him in 2014 under a blog post of John Baez. They were lost due to a rearrangement of the website, but the central parts were copied into the original blog post. Further comments by Greg Egan on 16 April 2018 concern the search for a generalized conjecture involving ellipsoids. A proof of the inequality also being necessary was published by Sergei Drozdov on 16 October 2023 on ArXiv.

In 2018, Egan described a construction of superpermutations, thus giving an upper bound to their minimum length. On 27 February 2019, using ideas developed by Robin Houston and others, Egan produced a superpermutation of seven symbols of length 5906, breaking previous records.

== Personal life ==
As of 2015, Egan lives in Perth. He is a vegetarian and an atheist.

Egan does not attend science fiction conventions, does not sign books, and has stated that he appears in no photographs on the web, though both SF fan sites and Google Search have at times mistakenly identified him as the subject of photos of other people with the same name.

== Awards ==
Egan's work has won the Japanese Seiun Award for best translated fiction nine times.

Teranesia was named the winner of the 2000 Ditmar Award for best novel, but Egan declined the award.

Work	Year & Award	Category	Result	Ref.
"Scatter My Ashes"	1989 Ditmar Award	Australian Short Fiction	Nominated	
"Scatter My Ashes"	1989 Interzone Readers Poll	Fiction	5th Place	
"The Cutie"	1990 Interzone Readers Poll	Fiction	5th Place	
"Learning to Be Me"	1991 BSFA Award	Short Fiction	Nominated	
"Learning to Be Me"	1991 Interzone Readers Poll	Fiction	Won	
"Learning to Be Me"	1991 Locus Award	Short Story	Nominated	
"Learning to Be Me"	1995 Hayakawa's S-F Magazine Reader's Award	Foreign Short Story	Won	
"Learning to Be Me"	2007 Premio Ignotus	Foreign Short Story	Won	
"Axiomatic"	1991 BFSA	Short Fiction	Nominated	
"Axiomatic"	1991 Interzone Readers Poll	Fiction	2nd Place	
"Axiomatic"	1991 Locus Award	Short Story	Nominated	
"Axiomatic"	1997 Premio Ignotus	Foreign Story	Nominated	
"Eugene"	1991 Interzone Readers Poll	Fiction	7th Place	
"The Safe-Deposit Box"	1991 Asimov's Readers' Poll	Novelette	4th Place	
"The Safe-Deposit Box"	1991 Locus Award	Novelette	Nominated	
"Appropriate Love"	1992 Interzone Readers Poll	Fiction	9th Place	
"Appropriate Love"	1999 Premio Ignotus	Foreign Story	Nominated	
"The Caress"	1991 Ditmar Award	Australian Short Fiction	Nominated	
"The Caress"	1991 Asimov's Readers' Poll	Novelette	7th Place	
"The Caress"	1991 Locus Award	Novelette	Nominated	
"Fidelity"	1992 Locus Award	Short Story	Nominated	
"Reification Highway"	1992 BFSA	Short Fiction	Nominated	
"The Infinite Assassin"	1992 Interzone Readers Poll	Fiction	Won	
"The Infinite Assassin"	2002 Premio Ignotus	Foreign Story	Nominated	
"Blood Sisters"	1992 Locus Award	Short Story	Nominated	
"Blood Sisters"	1992 Interzone Readers Poll	Fiction	8th Place	
"Unstable Orbits in the Space of Lies"	1993 Locus Award	Short Story	Nominated	
"Unstable Orbits in the Space of Lies"	1993 Interzone Readers Poll	Fiction	4th Place	
"Closer"	1993 Ditmar Award	Short Fiction	Won	
Quarantine	1993 Ditmar Award	Long Fiction	Won	
Quarantine	1994 Kurd Laßwitz Award	Foreign Work	Nominated	
Quarantine	2000 Premio Ignotus	Foreign Novel	Nominated	
Quarantine	2000 Seiun Award	Translated Long Work	Nominated	
"Into Darkness"	1993 Asimov's Readers' Poll	Novelette	2nd Place	
"Into Darkness"	1993 Locus Award	Novelette	Nominated	
"Dust"	1993 Asimov's Readers' Poll	Novelette	6th Place	
"Dust"	1993 Locus Award	Novelette	Nominated	
"Dust"	1997 Premio Ignotus	Foreign Story	Nominated	
"The Walk"	1993 Asimov's Readers' Poll	Short Story	10th Place	
"Worthless"	1993 Ditmar Award	Short Fiction	Nominated	
"The Extra"	1994 Locus Award	Short Story	Nominated	
"Chaff"	1994 Locus Award	Novelette	Nominated	
"Chaff"	1994 Interzone Readers Poll	Fiction	7th Place	
"Cocoon"	1994 Otherwise Award		Honor	
"Cocoon"	1995 Theodore Sturgeon Award	Short Science Fiction	Finalist	
"Cocoon"	1995 SF Chronicle Award	Novelette	Won	
"Cocoon"	1995 Locus Award	Novelette	Nominated	
"Cocoon"	1995 Asimov's Readers' Poll	Novelette	Won	
"Cocoon"	1995 Hugo Award	Novelette	Nominated	
"Cocoon"	1995 Ditmar Award	Australian Short Fiction	Won	
Permutation City	1995 BSFA Award	Novel	Nominated	
Permutation City	1995 John W. Campbell Memorial Award	Science Fiction Novel	Won	
Permutation City	1995 Locus Award	SF Novel	Nominated	
Permutation City	1995 Ditmar Award	Australian Long Fiction	Won	
Permutation City	1996 Philip K. Dick Award		Nominated	
Permutation City	1996 Kurd Laßwitz Award	Foreign Work	Nominated	
Permutation City	1999 Italia Awards	International Novel	Nominated	
Permutation City	1999 Premio Ignotus	Foreign Novel	Nominated	
Permutation City	2000 Seiun Award	Translated Long Work	Nominated	
"Our Lady of Chernobyl"	1995 Interzone Readers Poll	Fiction	5th Place	
"Our Lady of Chernobyl"	1995 Ditmar Award	Australian Short Fiction	Nominated	
"Our Lady of Chernobyl"	1995 Locus Award	Novelette	Nominated	
"Luminous"	1995 Aurealis Award	Science Fiction Short Story	Won	
"Luminous"	1996 SF Chronicle Award	Novelette	Nominated	
"Luminous"	1996 Locus Award	Novelette	Nominated	
"Luminous"	1996 Hugo Award	Novelette	Nominated	
"Luminous"	2003 Seiun Award	Translated Short Story	Won	
"Luminous"	2011 Premio Ignotus	Foreign Short Story	Won	
"Wang's Carpets"	1995 Aurealis Award	Science Fiction Short Story	Nominated	
"Wang's Carpets"	1996 Locus Award	Novelette	Nominated	
"Wang's Carpets"	1998 Hayakawa's S-F Magazine Reader's Award	Foreign Short Story	Won	
Distress	1995 Aurealis Award	Science Fiction Novel	Won	
Distress	1997 Locus Award	SF Novel	Nominated	
Distress	2000 Kurd Laßwitz Award	Foreign Work	Won	
Distress	2001 Premio Ignotus	Foreign Novel	Nominated	
Distress	2005 Seiun Award	Translated Long Work	Won	
"Mister Volition"	1995 Aurealis Award	Science Fiction Short Story	Nominated	
"Mister Volition"	1995 BFSA Award	Short Fiction	Nominated	
"Mister Volition"	1999 Premio Ignotus	Foreign Story	Nominated	
"Mister Volition"	2003 Hayakawa's S-F Magazine Reader's Award	Foreign Short Story	Won	
"TAP"	1996 Hugo Award	Novelette	Nominated	
"TAP"	1996 Locus Award	Novelette	Nominated	
"TAP"	1996 Asimov's Readers' Poll	Novelette	8th Place	
"Silver Fire"	1996 Interzone Readers Poll	Fiction	2nd Place	
"Silver Fire"	1996 Locus Award	Novelette	Nominated	
Axiomatic (Collection)	1996 Locus Award	Collection	Nominated	
Axiomatic (Collection)	2008 Grand prix de l'Imaginaire	Foreign Short story/Collection of Foreign Short Stories	Nominated	
Our Lady of Chernobyl (Collection)	1996 Locus Award	Collection	Nominated	
Our Lady of Chernobyl (Collection)	1997 Grand prix de l'Imaginaire	Foreign Short story/Collection of Foreign Short Stories	Nominated	
Transition Dreams	1997 Grand prix de l'Imaginaire	Foreign Short story/Collection of Foreign Short Stories	Nominated	
Diaspora	1997 Aurealis Award	Science Fiction Novel	Nominated	
Diaspora	1998 Locus Award	SF Novel	Nominated	
Diaspora	2001 Kurd Laßwitz Award	Foreign Work	Nominated	
Diaspora	2006 Seiun Award	Translated Long Work	Won	
Diaspora	2010 Premio Ignotus	Foreign Novel	Won	
"Reasons to Be Cheerful"	1997 Aurealis Award	Science Fiction Short Story	Nominated	
"Reasons to Be Cheerful"	1998 Interzone Readers Poll	Fiction	Won	
"Reasons to Be Cheerful"	1998 Ditmar Award	Short Fiction	Nominated	
"Reasons to Be Cheerful"	1998 Locus Award	Novelette	Nominated	
"Reasons to Be Cheerful"	2002 Seiun Award	Translated Short Story	Won	
"Reasons to Be Cheerful"	2003 Premio Ignotus	Foreign Story	Nominated	
"Orphanogenesis"	1998 Locus Award	Short Story	Nominated	
"Oceanic"	1998 Aurealis Award	Science Fiction Short Story	Nominated	
"Oceanic"	1998 HOMer Award	Novella	Nominated	
"Oceanic"	1999 Asimov's Readers' Poll	Novella	Won	
"Oceanic"	1999 Locus Award	Novella	Won	
"Oceanic"	1999 Hugo Award	Novella	Won	
"Oceanic"	2000 Hayakawa's S-F Magazine Reader's Award	Foreign Short Story	Won	
"Oceanic"	2001 Seiun Award	Translated Short Story	Won	
"Oceanic"	2010 Grand prix de l'Imaginaire	Foreign-language Short Fiction	Won	
"The Planck Dive"	1998 HOMer Award	Novelette	Nominated	
"The Planck Dive"	1999 Locus Award	Novelette	Won	
"The Planck Dive"	1999 Theodore Sturgeon Award	Short Science Fiction	Finalist	
"The Planck Dive"	1999 Hugo Award	Novelette	Nominated	
Luminous (Collection)	1999 Locus Award	Collection	Nominated	
Teranesia	1999 Aurealis Award	Science Fiction Novel	Won	
Teranesia	2000 Locus Award	SF Novel	Nominated	
Teranesia	2000 Ditmar Award	Novel	Won (Declined)	
Teranesia	2001 Gaylactic Spectrum Award	Novel	Nominated	
Teranesia	2002 Italia Awards	International Novel	Nominated	
Teranesia	2002 Kurd Laßwitz Award	Foreign Work	Nominated	
"Border Guards"	2000 Hugo Award	Novelette	Nominated	
"Border Guards"	2000 Locus Award	Novelette	Won	
"Border Guards"	2000 Interzone Readers Poll	Fiction	6th Place	
"Oracle"	2001 Hugo Award	Novella	Nominated	
"Oracle"	2001 Asimov's Readers' Poll	Novella	Won	
"Oracle"	2001 Locus Award	Novella	Nominated	
"Oracle"	2001 Gaylactic Spectrum Award	Short Fiction	Nominated	
"Singleton"	2002 BFSA Award	Short Fiction	Nominated	
"Singleton"	2003 Locus Award	Novella	Nominated	
"Singleton"	2003 Theodore Sturgeon Award	Short Science Fiction	Finalist	
Schild's Ladder	2003 Prometheus Award	SF Novel	Finalist	
Schild's Ladder	2003 Locus Award	SF Novel	Nominated	
"Riding the Crocodile"	2007 Locus Award	Novella	Nominated	
"The Hundred Light-Year Diary"	2007 Premio Ignotus	Foreign Story	Nominated	
"Dark Integers"	2008 Hugo Award	Novelette	Nominated	
"Dark Integers"	2008 Asimov's Readers' Poll	Novelette	Won	
"Dark Integers"	2008 Locus Award	Novelette	Nominated	
"Dark Integers"	2010 Seiun Award	Translated Short Story	Won	
"Glory"	2008 Hugo Award	Novelette	Nominated	
"Glory"	2008 Locus Award	Novelette	Nominated	
"Crystal Nights"	2008 BFSA Award	Short Fiction	Nominated	
"Crystal Nights"	2009 Interzone Readers Poll	Story	3rd Place	
"Crystal Nights"	2009 Locus Award	Novelette	Nominated	
"Crystal Nights"	2011 Seiun Award	Translated Short Story	Nominated	
"Lost Continent"	2009 Locus Award	Novelette	Nominated	
Dark Integers and Other Stories	2009 Locus Award	Collection	Nominated	
Incandescence	2009 Locus Award	SF Novel	Nominated	
Incandescence	2011 Italia Awards	International Novel	Nominated	
Incandescence	2014 Seiun Award	Translated Long Work	Nominated	
Oceanic (Collection)	2010 Locus Award	Collection	Nominated	
"Hot Rock"	2010 Locus Award	Novella	Nominated	
The Clockwork Rocket	2011 Goodreads Choice Awards	Science Fiction	Nominated	
The Clockwork Rocket	2012 Locus Award	SF Novel	Nominated	
Zendegi	2011 Locus Award	SF Novel	Nominated	
Zendegi	2016 Seiun Award	Translated Long Work	Nominated	
The Eternal Flame	2013 Locus Award	SF Novel	Nominated	
"Zero for Conduct"	2014 Locus Award	Novelette	Nominated	
The Arrows of Time	2014 Locus Award	SF Novel	Nominated	
"Seventh Sight"	2015 Locus Award	Novelette	Nominated	
"Seventh Sight"	2017 Seiun Award	Translated Short Story	Nominated	
"Shadow Flock"	2015 Locus Award	Novelette	Nominated	
"The Four Thousand, the Eight Hundred"	2016 Locus Award	Novella	Nominated	
"The Four Thousand, the Eight Hundred"	2016 Theodore Sturgeon Award	Short Science Fiction	Finalist	
"The Four Thousand, the Eight Hundred"	2016 Asimov's Readers' Poll	Novella	5th Place	
"The Four Thousand, the Eight Hundred"	2017 Canopus Award	Short-Form Fiction	Nominated	
"Uncanny Valley"	2017 BFSA Award	Short Fiction	Nominated	
"Uncanny Valley"	2020 Seiun Award	Translated Short Story	Won	
"The Discrete Charm of the Turing Machine"	2018 Theodore Sturgeon Award	Short Science Fiction	Finalist	
"The Discrete Charm of the Turing Machine"	2018 Asimov's Readers' Poll	Novelette	2nd Place	
"The Slipway"	2019 Analog Readers Poll	Novelette	2nd Place	
"3-adica"	2019 Asimov's Readers' Poll	Novella	3rd Place	
The Best of Greg Egan	2020 Locus Award	Collection	Nominated	
"Bit Players"	2020 Seiun Award	Translated Short Story	Nominated	
"This is Not The Way Home"	2021 Seiun Award	Translated Short Story	Nominated	
"Light Up the Clouds"	2022 Asimov's Readers' Poll	Novella	4th Place	
"Didicosm"	2023 Analog Readers Poll	Novelette	3rd Place	
"Solidity"	2023 Asimov's Readers' Poll	Novelette	5th Place	
"Solidity"	2023 Locus Award	Novelette	Nominated	
"Solidity"	2024 Seiun Award	Translated Short Story	Won	
"Crisis Actors"	2025 Seiun Awards	Translated Short Story	Nominated	
"After Zero"	2026 Seiun Awards	Translated Short Story	Won	

== Works ==
=== Novels ===
- An Unusual Angle (1983), ISBN 0-909106-12-6
- Quarantine (1992), ISBN 0-7126-9870-1
- Permutation City (1994), ISBN 1-85798-174-X
- Distress (1995), ISBN 1-85798-286-X
- Diaspora (1997), ISBN 1-85798-438-2
- Teranesia (1999), ISBN 0-575-06854-X
- Schild's Ladder (2002), ISBN 0-575-07068-4
- Incandescence (2008), ISBN 978-1-59780-128-7
- Zendegi (2010), ISBN 978-1-59780-174-4
- Dichronauts (2017), ISBN 978-1597808927
- Perihelion Summer (2019), ISBN 978-1-250-31378-2
- The Book of All Skies (2021), ISBN 978-1-922240-38-5
- Scale (2023), ISBN 978-1-922240-44-6
- Morphotrophic (2024), ISBN 978-1-922240-51-4

==== Orthogonal trilogy ====
- The Clockwork Rocket (2011), ISBN 978-1-59780-227-7
- The Eternal Flame (2012), ISBN 978-1-59780-293-2
- The Arrows of Time (2013), ISBN 978-0-575-10576-8

=== Collections ===
Axiomatic (1995), ISBN 1-85798-281-9

- The Infinite Assassin (1991)
- The Hundred Light-Year Diary (1992)
- Eugene (1990)
- The Caress (1990)
- Blood Sisters (1991)
- Axiomatic (1990)
- The Safe-Deposit Box (1990)
- Seeing (1995)
- A Kidnapping (1995)
- Learning to Be Me (1990)
- The Moat (1991)
- The Walk (1992)
- The Cutie (1989)
- Into Darkness (1992)
- Appropriate Love (1991)
- The Moral Virologist (1990)
- Closer (1992)
- Unstable Orbits in the Space of Lies (1992)

Our Lady of Chernobyl (1995), ISBN 0-646-23230-4

- Chaff (1993)
- Beyond the Whistle Test (1989)
- Transition Dreams (1993)
- Our Lady of Chernobyl (1994)

Luminous (1998), ISBN 1-85798-551-6

- Chaff (1993)
- Mitochondrial Eve (1995)
- Luminous (1995)
- Mister Volition (1995)
- Cocoon (1994)
- Transition Dreams (1993)
- Silver Fire (1995)
- Reasons to Be Cheerful (1997)
- Our Lady of Chernobyl (1994)
- The Planck Dive (1998)

Dark Integers and Other Stories (2008), ISBN 978-1-59606-155-2

- Luminous (1995)
- Riding the Crocodile (2005)
- Dark Integers (2007)
- Glory (2007)
- Oceanic (1998)

Crystal Nights and Other Stories (2009), ISBN 978-1-59606-240-5

- Lost Continent (2008)
- Crystal Nights (2008)
- Steve Fever (2007)
- TAP (1995)
- Induction (2007)
- Singleton (2002) (Note: Singleton introduced the concept of the Qusp, which was later used in the novel Schild's Ladder.)
- Oracle (2000)
- Border Guards (1999)
- Hot Rock (2009)

Oceanic (2009), ISBN 978-0-575-08652-4

- Lost Continent (2008)
- Dark Integers (2007)
- Crystal Nights (2008)
- Steve Fever (2007)
- Induction (2007)
- Singleton (2002)
- Oracle (2000)
- Border Guards (1999)
- Riding the Crocodile (2005)
- Glory (2007)
- Hot Rock (2009)
- Oceanic (1998)

The Best of Greg Egan (2019), ISBN 978-1-59606-942-8

- Learning to Be Me (1990)
- Axiomatic (1990)
- Appropriate Love (1991)
- Into Darkness (1992)
- Unstable Orbits in the Space of Lies (1992)
- Closer (1992)
- Chaff (1993)
- Luminous (1995)
- Silver Fire (1995)
- Reasons to Be Cheerful (1997)
- Oceanic (1998)
- Oracle (2000)
- Singleton (2002)
- Dark Integers (2007)
- Crystal Nights (2008)
- Zero For Conduct (2013)
- Bit Players (2014)
- Uncanny Valley (2017)
- 3-adica (2018)
- Instantiation (2019)

Instantiation (2020), ISBN 978-1-922240-39-2

- The Discrete Charm of the Turing Machine (2017)
- Zero For Conduct (2013)
- Uncanny Valley (2017)
- Seventh Sight (2014)
- The Nearest (2018)
- Shadow Flock (2014)
- Bit Players (2014)
- Break My Fall (2014)
- 3-adica (2018)
- The Slipway (2019)
- Instantiation (2019)

Sleep and the Soul (2023), ISBN 978-1-922240-47-7

- You and Whose Army? (2020)
- This Is Not the Way Home (2019)
- Zeitgeber (2019)
- Crisis Actors (2022)
- Sleep and the Soul (2021)
- After Zero (2022)
- Dream Factory (2022)
- Light Up the Clouds (2021)
- Night Running (2023)
- Solidity (2022)

Phoresis and Other Journeys (2023), ISBN 978-1-922240-50-7

- The Four Thousand, The Eight Hundred (2016), ISBN 978-1-59606-791-2
- Dispersion (2020)
- Phoresis (2018), ISBN 978-1-59606-866-7

=== Other short fiction ===
- Artifact (1983)
- The Way She Smiles, The Things She Says (1985)
- Tangled Up (1985)
- Mind Vampires (1986)
- Neighbourhood Watch (1987)
- Scatter My Ashes (1988)
- The Extra (1990)
- The Vat (1990)
- In Numbers (1991)
- The Demon's Passage (1991)
- Fidelity (1991)
- Before (1992)
- Dust (1992) (Note: Dust was incorporated into the novel Permutation City as the first few chapters in one narrative thread.)
- Worthless (1992)
- Reification Highway (1992)
- Wang's Carpets (1995) (Note: Wang refers to the mathematician Hao Wang – the carpets are living embodiments of Wang tiles. This story, minorly reworked, became a section of the novel Diaspora.)
- Yeyuka (1997)
- Only Connect (2000)
- In the Ruins (2013)
- Didicosm (2023)
- Death and the Gorgon (2024)
- Vouch for Me (2024)
- Understudies (2025)
- Spare Parts for the Mind (2025)

=== Excerpted ===
- Diaspora:
  - "Orphanogenesis" in Interzone issue 123, September 1997

=== Academic papers ===
- An Efficient Algorithm for the Riemannian 10j Symbols by Dan Christensen and Greg Egan
- Asymptotics of 10j Symbols by John Baez, Dan Christensen and Greg Egan
- Conic-Helical Orbits of Planets around Binary Stars do not Exist by Greg Egan

== Short movies ==
The production of a short film inspired by the story "Axiomatic" commenced in 2015, and the film was released online in October 2017.
