= The Thackery T. Lambshead Pocket Guide to Eccentric & Discredited Diseases =

2003 book

The Thackery T. Lambshead Pocket Guide to Eccentric & Discredited Diseases (2003) is an anthology of fantasy medical conditions edited by Jeff VanderMeer and Mark Roberts, and published by Night Shade Books. A second edition was published by Spectra in 2005.

== Contents ==
The Guide claims to be 83rd edition of a medical reference text first compiled by the fictional Dr. Thackery T. Lambshead in 1915. It contains generally humorous entries (in varying degrees of darkness) with describing fantastical diseases, which together detail the "secret medical history" of the 20th century. Each entry presents a history of the disease, its characteristic symptoms, and any cure that might exist, all written in a faux encyclopedic style. Many diseases are accompanied by illustrations. The book also includes essays about the adventures of the titular Thackery T. Lambshead, "a sort of medical Indiana Jones." Appendices to the book include a history of its many editions, and biographies of the many contributing authors, named as "doctors," in which their writing career is recast as a medical career.

== Reception ==
In 2004, the book was shortlisted for a Hugo Award for Best Related Book and a World Fantasy Award for Best Anthology.

A sequel anthology was released in 2011 called The Thackery T. Lambshead Cabinet of Curiosities, which was co-edited by Jeff and Ann VanderMeer.

The encyclopedia makes an appearance in the novel Monstrocity by Jeffrey Thomas. It is also referenced in VanderMeer's own collection City of Saints and Madmen.

== Contributors ==
The anthology includes entries by almost 70 different authors. These contributors include:

- Alan M. Clark
- Alan Moore
- Andrew J. Wilson
- Brendan Connell
- Brian Evenson
- Brian Stableford
- China Miéville
- Cory Doctorow
- David Langford
- Dawn Andrews
- Elliot Fintushel
- G. Eric Schaller
- Gahan Wilson
- Gary Couzens
- Harvey Jacobs
- Iain Rowan
- Jack Slay, Jr.
- Jay Caselburg
- Jeff Topham
- Jeffrey Ford
- Jeffrey Thomas
- John Coulthart
- Kage Baker
- K.J. Bishop
- L. Timmel Duchamp
- Lance Olsen
- Liz Williams
- Martin Newell
- Michael Barry
- Michael Bishop
- Michael Cisco
- Michael Cobley
- Michael Moorcock
- Mike O'Driscoll
- Nathan Ballingrud
- Neil Gaiman
- Neil Williamson
- Paul Di Filippo
- R.M. Berry
- Rachel Pollack
- Rhys Hughes
- Richard Calder
- Rikki Ducornet
- Robert Freeman Wexler
- Sara Gwenllian Jones
- Shelley Jackson
- Stepan Chapman
- Steve Rasnic Tem
- Steve Redwood
- Tamar Yellin
- Tim Lebbon
