= The Night Wire =

Short story by H.F. Arnold

- Short story by H. F. Arnold
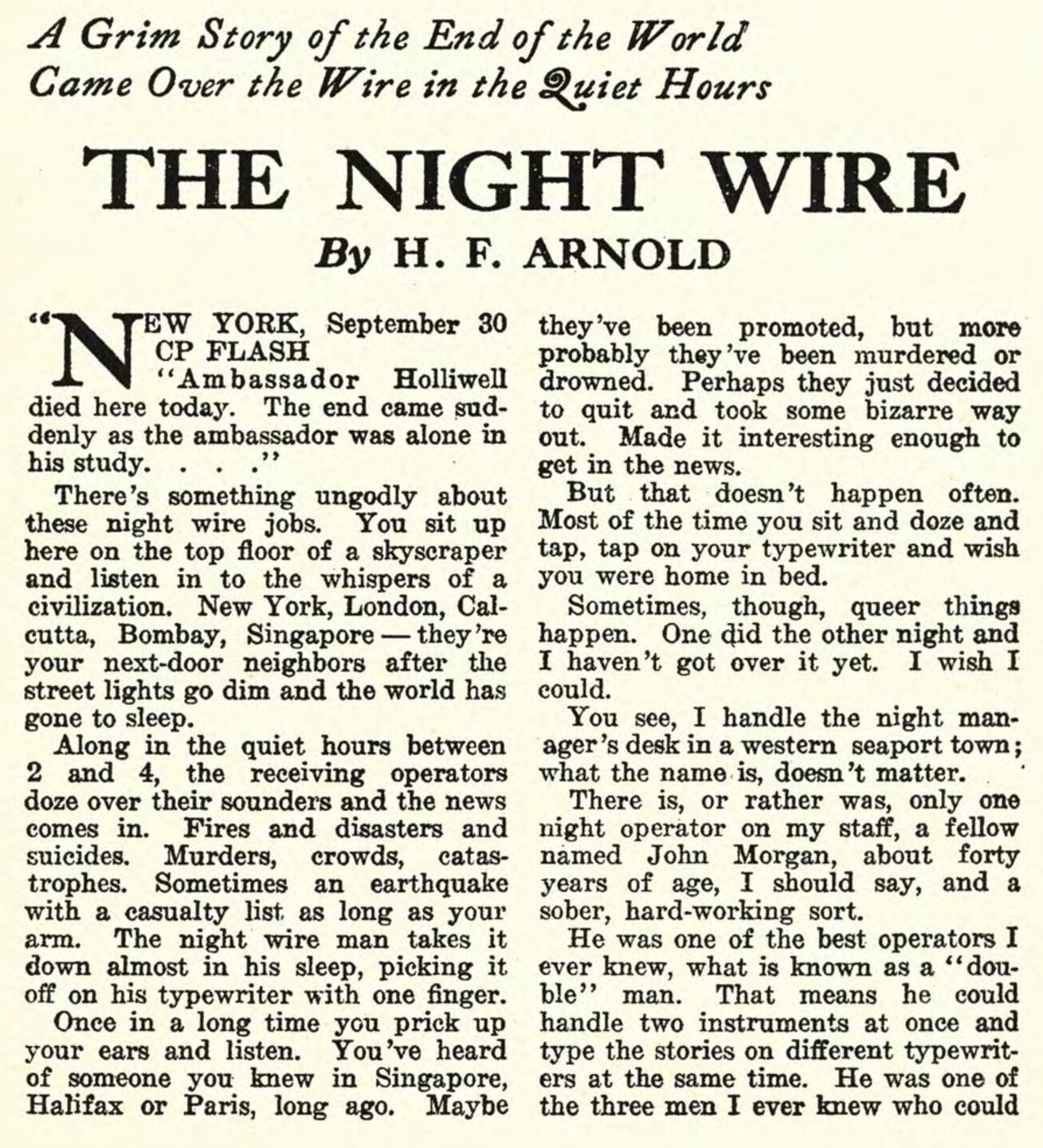

Text available at Wikisource
- Country: United States
- Language: English
- Genre: Horror short story

Publication
- Published in: Weird Tales
- Media type: Print (magazine)
- Publication date: September 1926

"The Night Wire" is a short story by H. F. Arnold. It was first published in Weird Tales in September 1926.

== Plot summary ==
The narrator, Jim, is working overnight in a news bureau in a skyscraper in an unspecified Western seaport town, where he and his colleague John Morgan are transcribing stories transmitted from a wire service over a telegraph via Morse code. Morgan - known to his co-workers as a "double man" due to his ability to type out two stories simultaneously without error - complains of feeling tired, then of the room being stuffy. Throughout the night, Jim sorts through the stories Morgan has transcribed. These include a series of dispatches from Chicago over the second wire concerning "Xebico", a city Jim has never heard of before.

The first dispatch announces that an unusually heavy and impenetrable fog had settled over Xebico at 4 PM the previous day, stopping traffic, and is growing heavier.

The second set of dispatches state that the fog has continued to grow, shrouding the town in darkness and emitting a "sickly" odor. They include an account from a sexton who claims that the fog originated from a village graveyard. The sexton claims to have seen something moving in the midst of the fog; as he fled, he heard screams from the homes next to the graveyard. A rescue party has been dispatched to investigate.

The third dispatch states that the rescue party has failed to return, and a larger party has been sent after them. The fog has continued to grow thicker, with an odor of decay. Cries are heard from the outskirts of the city.

After reading the third dispatch, Jim looks out of the window of the skyscraper, imagining that he sees a faint trace of fog below.

The fourth and final dispatch states that neither rescue party has returned, and that the author of the dispatches is cut off. The author speculates that the cries they hear are the death cries of the residents of Xebico, and notes they are growing closer to the center. As the fog reaches the city center, the author of the dispatch - looking down on the streets from a room on the thirteenth floor - states "The fog is not simply vapor -- it lives! By the side of each moaning and weeping human is a companion figure, an aura of strange and vari-colored hues [...] The prone and writhing bodies have been stripped of their clothing. They are being consumed -- piecemeal." The author then states that "The whole sky is in flames. Colors as yet unseen by man or demon. [...] As I look, they are swinging closer and closer, a million miles at each jump. [...] The lights are coming closer. They are all around me. I am enveloped. I..."

After the dispatch terminates abruptly, Jim contacts Chicago, who advise that they have not transmitted any messages that night. Assuming that they have been hoaxed, Jim shakes Morgan, only to find that "His body was quite cold. Morgan had been dead for hours." Jim wonders "Could it be that his sensitized brain and automatic fingers had continued to record impressions even after the end?"

The story closes with Jim vowing never again to work overnight for the news bureau. Jim notes that Xebico does not appear in the atlas, stating "Whatever it was that killed John Morgan will forever remain a mystery."

== Publication ==
"The Night Wire" is one of just three stories authored by Henry Ferris Arnold (1902-1963). Aaron Worth suggests that it "is almost certainly based on its author's own experience, either as an operator or someone working closely with operators in the news business". "The Night Wire" was first published in volume 8, number 3 of the pulp magazine Weird Tales in September 1926. It has since been collected many times, including in The Night Side in 1947 and in The Weird in 2011.

== Reception ==
Ann VanderMeer and Jeff VanderMeer describe "The Night Wire" as "the most popular story from the first golden age of [Weird Tales], noting its ability "...to chill the reader today despite using elements that could have made the story feel dated" and citing it as a "perfect example of how the weird creates not just unease, but dislocation". E. F. Bleiler describes it as "A tantalising story that might be taken as either science-fiction or supernatural fiction" and "convincingly told and effective". Writing for The Washington Post, Michael Dirda describes it as "a pulp masterpiece". Jason Colavito interprets "The Night Wire" as an evolution of the traditional ghost story, where "it is modern technology rather than moldy old houses and ancient curses that serve to transmit horror across time and space". Similarly, Aaron Worth suggests that "The Night Wire" "conveys the idea of 'media' wedded to that of 'darkness'."
