= Jess Nevins =

American author (born 1966)

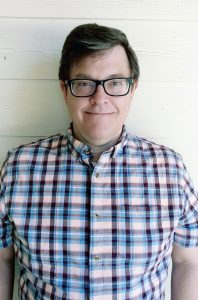
- Nevins in 2018
- Born: 1966 (age 59–60)
- Occupations: Author and librarian
- Writing career
- Period: 2003–present
- Genres: Victoriana, Pulp
- Website: jessnevins.com

Jess Nevins (born 1966) is an American author and research librarian best known for annotated guides and encyclopedias covering Victoriana, comic books, genre fiction and pulp fiction. Among Nevin's books are Encyclopedia of Fantastic Victoriana, Horror Fiction in the 20th Century and Encyclopedia of Golden Age Superheroes. He has been a recipient and finalist for a number of honors, including the World Fantasy, Sidewise, and Locus Awards.

== Life ==
Nevins is married with one daughter and is a life-long fan of comic books. Nevins received his Master of Library and Information Science from Simmons College in 1996 and has previously worked as a research librarian at Sam Houston State University in Huntsville, Texas and at the University of California at Riverside. He is currently employed as a reference librarian at Lone Star College-Tomball.

== Comic book annotations ==
=== Early work ===
Nevins has annotated a number of comic books, starting with several Elseworlds published by DC Comics including Kingdom Come and JLA: The Nail. He first encountered literary annotation in college, with the footnotes in T. S. Eliot's "The Waste Land" making a big impact on him.

=== The League of Extraordinary Gentlemen ===
Nevins has annotated many of Alan Moore's comics, including spending four years creating notes for The League of Extraordinary Gentlemen. Nevins published his notations to The League of Extraordinary Gentlemen online, with his work called "an excellent guide" that "highlights Moore's homage to Victorian style."

Moore said of Nevins' work, "It was only when someone finally conveyed these internet postings to me... that I began to understand the invaluable asset that Jess represented... I realised that if we had [him] tracking down all of the references for the readers, then we could be as obscure and far-reaching as we wanted...", Moore later said Nevins' work helped inform The League of Extraordinary Gentlemen, Volume II: "The New Traveller's Almanac": "The patient work contained within this current volume [Heroes & Monsters] has played an important part in the construction of this vast, imaginary global edifice that we're constructing... [the Almanac]", Moore sees "these companion volumes as having a necessary organic place in the body of the work itself."

=== Other annotations ===
In-between volumes of LoEG, Nevins has tackled Moore and Gene Ha's Top Ten. He subsequently provided annotations on Moore and Ha's 2005 Top Ten graphic novel The Forty-Niners and Paul Di Filippo and Jerry Ordway's 2005 sequel miniseries Beyond the Farthest Precinct. Nevins also annotated Neil Gaiman and Andy Kubert's 2003 mini-series 1602 from Marvel Comics.

== Reference guides ==
Nevins initially compiled several reference guides on his website including The Golden Age Heroes Directory, the Pulp and Adventure Heroes Directory, and Fantastic, Mysterious, and Adventurous Victoriana. He later expanded some of these online resources into print, including in The Encyclopedia of Fantastic Victoriana.

In May 2007, McFarland & Company published his Pulp Magazine Holdings Directory, a listing of which issues of pulp magazines are held in American, Canadian, British, and European libraries. In 2016, McFarland released his book The Victorian Bookshelf: An Introduction to 61 Essential Novels. In 2013, he wrote Fables Encyclopedia with Bill Willingham for Vertigo Comics, with each entry examining the historical origins of characters along with how Fables reworked them.

Nevins's books have also been released by Praeger Publishing, Flame Tree Publishing, and MonkeyBrain while he still self-publishes some titles, such as The Encyclopedia of Pulp Heroes. For this guide, released in 2017, Nevins spent 10 years researching early 20th century genre literature from across the world. He also created a companion superhero reference work, the Encyclopedia of Golden Age Superheroes released by High Rock Press.

== Other work ==
Nevins has also written fictional stories appearing in the Tales of the Shadowmen anthology series: "A Jest, To Pass The Time" from volume 2, "Red in Tooth and Claw" in volume 4, and "A Root That Beareth Gall and Worms" in volume 5.

Since September 2024 Nevins had been releasing a bi-weekly podcast The History of Comics in 500 issues. This covers comics as a global medium, rather than just anglophone superhero stories.

== Critical reception ==
In Asimov's Science Fiction, Paul Di Filippo described Nevins as a "fount of erudition and charm" and said that Encyclopedia of Fantastic Victoriana is an "instantly indispensable part of any serious fan's reference shelf." Elizabeth Hand in The Magazine of Fantasy & Science Fiction called the encyclopedia "one of the best books of the year."

Writing in The Washington Post, Michael Dirda praised Horror Fiction in the 20th Century for containing "groundbreaking chapters" pointing to important horror writers outside the Anglo-American tradition while also criticizing the book for not containing specific titles for well-known horror authors.

Midwest Book Review called The Victorian Bookshelf: An Introduction to 61 Essential Novels "impressively well written, organized and presented, making it an ideal and highly recommended addition to both community and academic library."

Matthew David Surridge in Black Gate called The Evolution of the Costumed Avenger a "tremendous resource in not just the historical development of the superhero, but the analysis of the superheroic idea" while John DeNardo in Kirkus Reviews said it is "a well-researched and utterly captivating book offering the complete history of the superhero and how the concept has evolved over time." The Wall Street Journal also praised the book, calling Nevins a "super-researcher" for mapping "the DNA that links ancient Enkidu to our own Wolverine. He convincingly shows that the superheroes of today's page and screen got their start long before baby Kal-El was sent rocketing toward Earth as the planet Krypton exploded.

== Awards ==
Nevins's book Horror Fiction in the 20th Century: Exploring Literature's Most Chilling Genre (2020) won a Reference and User Services Association award from the American Library Association as one of the 10 most outstanding reference works of the year. The book was also a finalist for the Locus Award.

He has also been a finalist for the International Horror Guild Award for Heroes & Monsters: The Unofficial Companion to The League of Extraordinary Gentlemen, the World Fantasy Award for Encyclopedia of Fantastic Victoriana, and the Sidewise Award for "An Alternate History of Chinese Science Fiction."

== Bibliography ==
=== Books ===
- Heroes & Monsters: The Unofficial Companion to the League of Extraordinary Gentlemen (paperback, 239 pages, MonkeyBrain, 2003, ISBN 1-932265-04-X, Titan Books, 2006, ISBN 1-84576-316-5)
- A Blazing World: The Unofficial Companion to the Second League of Extraordinary Gentlemen (paperback, 240 pages, MonkeyBrain, 2004, ISBN 1-932265-10-4, Titan Books, 2006, ISBN 1-84576-317-3)
- Encyclopedia of Fantastic Victoriana (hardcover, 1200 pages, MonkeyBrain, 2005, ISBN 1-932265-15-5)
- Pulp Magazine Holdings Directory: Library Collections in North America and Europe (McFarland & Company, May 2007, ISBN 0-7864-3068-0)
- Impossible Territories: An Unofficial Companion to the League of Extraordinary Gentlemen The Black Dossier (paperback, 304 pages, MonkeyBrain, July 2008, ISBN 1-932265-24-4)
- Fables Encyclopedia with Bill Willingham (Vertigo Comics, 2013)
- Homefront Horrors: Frights Away From the Front Lines, 1914-1918 (edited by Nevins, Dover Publications, 2016)
- The Victorian Bookshelf: An Introduction to 61 Essential Novels (McFarland, 2016)
- Encyclopedia of Pulp Heroes (self-published ebook, 2017)
- Encyclopedia of Golden Age Superheroes (High Rock Press, 2nd ed. 2017)
- The Evolution of the Costumed Avenger: The 4,000-Year History of the Superhero (Praeger, 2017)
- The Astounding Illustrated History of Science Fiction by Dave Golder, Jess Nevins, Russ Thorne and Sarah Dobbs (Flame Tree Publishing, 2017)
- Horror Fiction in the 20th Century: Exploring Literature's Most Chilling Genre (Praeger Publishing, January 7, 2020) ISBN 978-1440862052

=== Essays and introductions ===
- "An Alternate History of Chinese Science Fiction" (online essay, No Fear of the Future, 2006)
- "Introduction" to Nick Carter vs. Fantômas by Alexandre Bisson & Guillaume Livet (adaptation by Frank Morlock) (Black Coat Press, 2007) ISBN 1-934543-05-5
- "Introduction" to Paper Cities: An Anthology of Urban Fantasy by Ekaterina Sedia (ed.) (Senses Five Press, 2008) ISBN 0-9796246-0-6
- "Introduction: The 19th-Century Roots of Steampunk," Steampunk edited by Ann and Jeff VanderMeer (Tachyon, 2008)
- "Introduction" to Fables: The Deluxe Edition, Book Four by Bill Willingham, (DC Comics, 2012)
- "Introduction" to Darkness and Dawn: The Complete Dystopian Science Fiction Masterwork by George Allan England (Dover Publications, 2015)
