= Lost Continent (short story) =

2008 short story by Greg Egan

- Short story by Greg Egan
- Country: Australia
- Language: English
- Genre: Science fiction

Publication
- Published in: The Starry Rift
- Media type: Print
- Publication date: 2008

"Lost Continent" is a science-fiction short story by Australian writer Greg Egan, first published in The Starry Rift edited by Jonathan Strahan in 2008. The short story was included in the collections Crystal Nights and Other Stories in 2009 and Oceanic in 2009. It also appeared in the anthology The Time Traveller’s Almanac edited by Ann VanderMeer and Jeff VanderMeer in 2013.

== Plot ==
Ali and his friends are time travelers seeking refuge on a new continent. But bureaucracy treats them like numbers instead of humans and imprisons them in camps until their interview, which according to other refugees might take many months. Nobody knows when exactly their interview will finally happen and even afterwards, they will only advance from Stage One to Stage Two of the application process. After a few months in the camp, a group of activists visits to demonstrate. Police arrives to violently dissolve their gathering, but they still manage to get their message into the camp: If they give their numbers to the activists, they will receive letters from them. Ali and his friends all write their numbers, all they've ever been to authority in the camp, on a piece of paper and throw it over the fence attached to a stone, where it is picked up by an activist, who had waved at them with his hand. Looking forward to finally get treated like humans, Ali and his friends find new hope despite the total chaos around them.

== Translation ==
The short story was translated into French (2009), Japanese by Makoto Yamagishi (2011 & 2019) and Chinese (2024).

== Background ==
In the 2000s, Egan was active in campaigning for refugee rights, including the end of mandatory detention for asylum seekers in Australia, for a few years. In an interview with David Conyers for Virtual Worlds and Imagined Futures in 2009, Egan called it an "eye-opening experience to see people mistreated in that way", revealing that "Lost Continent" is "an allegory of the whole thing, just to get some of the anger out of my system and move on." Egan further wrote about his experience and personal connections made with refugees in The Razor Wire Looking Glass in November 2003, an essay finished after his fifth journey to the immigration detention centre in Port Hedland:

Of eight Afghanis I know who’ve gone back, unable to bear detention any longer, six found the situation so perilous that they had to flee again. People returning to other countries have been arrested at the airport and imprisoned without charge or trial. In at least three cases documented by church groups, rejected asylum seekers returning from Australia have been murdered. That’s the choice we’re offering people: be delivered into the hands of your enemy, or stay here and rot in prison. [....] At the less subtle end of the spectrum, I know an Afghani man who was told, “Yes, the Taliban killed your father and your brother, so your father and your brother would have deserved visas, but you’re safe here in front of me now, so how can you say you were in danger?” It’s hard to imagine a more brutal catch-22. I also know people who’ve been told, “Your life would be in danger if you returned, but not for a reason covered by the refugee convention, so we don’t owe you any kind of protection.”

== Reception ==
=== Reviews ===
Publishers Weekly writes that "steadfastly reductionist, Egan nevertheless makes room for the moral implications of the treatment of refugees."

Paul Kincaid writes in Strange Horizons in a review of The Time Traveller's Almanac, that the short story "is a heartfelt complaint about the way we treat refugees today, although the time travel element in the story is almost completely irrelevant."

Greg Johnson writes on the SF Site, that the "mix of here today reality and the imaginative use of science fictional elements is characteristic."

=== Awards ===
The novel was a Locus Award Nominee for Best SF Novelette in 2009 and reached the 14th place.
