= Finch (novel) =

2009 novel by Jeff VanderMeer

- Paperback edition cover
- Author: Jeff VanderMeer
- Language: English
- Genre: Fantasy; Noir
- Publisher: Underland Press
- Publication date: November 2009
- Publication place: United States
- Media type: Print
- Pages: 339 pp.
- ISBN: 0-9802260-1-5
- OCLC: 318422341

Finch is a fantasy novel by American writer Jeff VanderMeer, his third set in the Ambergris universe. Written in the noir style of detective novels, it stands alone, while referencing characters and events from the earlier City of Saints and Madmen and Shriek: An Afterword.

== Plot ==
At the time of Finch, Ambergris is ruled by the gray caps, a non-human, "spore-based" species. Their "Rising" followed a destructive civil war between rival human factions.

The title character, reluctant detective John Finch, is tasked with investigating a double-murder, one victim a human and the second a gray cap.

== Reception ==
Eric Brown reviewed the book for The Guardian and says that "Finch plays with the conventions of the noir thriller, espionage and fantasy genres, mixing all three to produce something unique and unsettling." He does suggest that the "fractured, fragmented prose style ... is likely to alienate as many readers as it charms" but concludes that the book is "a compelling experience, a fungalpunk nightmare pullulating with dark, phantasmagorical transformations: it works equally as a stylish detective story, a perverse example of the New Weird fantasy subgenre, and an effective metaphor for the dehumanising effects of occupying forces and totalitarian regimes."

=== Awards and honors ===
The novel was a nominee for the 2010 World Fantasy Award for Best Novel, and for the 2010 Nebula Award.
