= Southern Reach Series =

Novel series by Jeff VanderMeer

- Annihilation; Authority; Acceptance; Absolution; Abdication
- Author: Jeff VanderMeer
- Country: United States
- Language: English
- Genre: Fantasy, Horror, Science fiction
- Published: 2014–2027
- Media type: Print (hardcover, paperback); E-book
- No. of books: 5

The Southern Reach Series is a series of novels by the American author Jeff VanderMeer first published in 2014—Annihilation, Authority, Acceptance, Absolution, and Abdication. The series takes its name from the secret agency that is central to the plot. In 2013, Paramount Pictures bought the movie rights for the series, and a film adaptation of Annihilation was made with Alex Garland as writer-director. The film was released in 2018. The most recent book in the series, Absolution, was released on 22 October 2024. Another titled Abdication, is set to be published in October 2027 and has been said by the author to be the last book in the series.

== "Area X" ==
In the series, Southern Reach is a secret agency that manages expeditions into a place known as Area X, an uninhabited and abandoned coastal area of an unnamed country which nature is gradually reclaiming. It is the main setting for Annihilation.

== Influences ==
VanderMeer has said that the main inspiration for Area X was a hike through St. Marks National Wildlife Refuge. However, he has also said that dreams inspired such elements as the writing in the tower from Annihilation. Moreover, VanderMeer has cited a number of books as having an influence on Southern Reach such as The Other Side of the Mountain by Michel Bernanos.

== Release ==
The original trilogy was released in quick succession over an eight-month period in what has been called an innovative "Netflix-inspired strategy". The strategy helped the series' second and third books reach the New York Times Best Seller list and established VanderMeer as "one of the most forward-thinking authors of the decade".

== Reception ==
=== Sales ===
The Southern Reach series has sold 1.5 million copies in the United States and has been translated into thirty-seven languages.

=== Critical reception ===
The series was positively received by critics. Slate called the original trilogy one of "the most uncompromising — yet most rewarding — genre series", while author Stephen King called it "creepy and fascinating". Writing about the third book, Acceptance, The New York Times said "VanderMeer has created an immersive and wonderfully realized world", and that the trilogy as a whole is a "pure reading pleasure". Annihilation won the Nebula and Shirley Jackson Awards for Best Novel. The original trilogy was also named a finalist for the 2015 World Fantasy Award and the 2016 Kurd-Laßwitz-Preis.

== Film adaptation ==
The first novel, Annihilation, was adapted into a film by director Alex Garland, starring Natalie Portman, Gina Rodriguez, Tessa Thompson, Jennifer Jason Leigh, and Oscar Isaac. It was released on February 23, 2018.
