= Annihilation (film) =

2018 science fiction cosmic horror film by Alex Garland

- Theatrical release poster
- Directed by: Alex Garland
- Screenplay by: Alex Garland
- Based on: Annihilation by Jeff VanderMeer
- Produced by: Scott Rudin; Andrew Macdonald; Allon Reich; Eli Bush
- Starring: Natalie Portman; Jennifer Jason Leigh; Gina Rodriguez; Tessa Thompson; Tuva Novotny; Oscar Isaac
- Cinematography: Rob Hardy
- Edited by: Barney Pilling
- Music by: Ben Salisbury; Geoff Barrow
- Production companies: Skydance; DNA Films; Scott Rudin Productions; Huahua Media
- Distributed by: Paramount Pictures (North America and China); Netflix (International)
- Release dates: February 13, 2018 (Regency Village Theater); February 23, 2018 (United States); March 12, 2018 (United Kingdom)
- Running time: 115 minutes
- Countries: United Kingdom; United States
- Language: English
- Budget: $40–55 million
- Box office: $43.1 million

Annihilation is a 2018 science fiction cosmic horror film written and directed by Alex Garland, loosely based on the 2014 novel by Jeff VanderMeer. It stars Natalie Portman, Jennifer Jason Leigh, Gina Rodriguez, Tessa Thompson, Tuva Novotny, and Oscar Isaac. The story follows a group of scientists who enter the Shimmer, a mysterious quarantined zone of mutating plants and animals caused by an alien presence. The movie is a co-production between the United Kingdom and the United States.

Released theatrically in the United States by Paramount Pictures on February 23, 2018, Annihilation was released digitally by Netflix in a number of other countries on March 12, 2018. It received largely positive reviews from critics and grossed $43 million worldwide. According to Empire magazine, the film addresses "depression, grief, and the human propensity for self-destruction."

== Plot ==
Cellular biology professor and former US Army soldier Lena is under interrogation. She recounts her expedition to an anomalous zone known as the Shimmer.

The Shimmer began expanding three years prior from a meteor that crash-landed at the St. Marks Light lighthouse in the St. Marks National Wildlife Refuge in Florida. Expeditions into the Shimmer invariably result in the complete disappearance of the crews. Lena's husband Kane disappears on one such expedition, but inexplicably appears inside their home one year later. Kane's condition quickly deteriorates, so Lena calls an ambulance, but security forces intercept them and take them both to a secret facility. Kane is put in intensive care, and psychologist Dr. Ventress invites Lena to join her on a new scientific expedition into the Shimmer.

Ventress and Lena join forces with three other women: Cassie, a geomorphologist; Anya, a paramedic; and Josie, a physicist. After they enter the Shimmer, they suddenly find themselves several days' journey into their expedition with no memory of what happened. Their communication equipment fails. They witness wildlife with bizarre mutations, and Josie is attacked by an albino alligator with several concentric rows of teeth.

Taking refuge at an abandoned military base, the group finds a video message recorded by Kane's earlier expedition, in which Kane cuts open another soldier's abdomen to reveal slithering intestines. The group finds the soldier's corpse, which has turned into an overgrown colony of lichens. At night, Lena and Ventress reflect on humanity's strange instinct to destabilize itself. A mutant bear attacks the base and drags Cassie away. Lena later finds her mutilated corpse.

The survivors reach an abandoned village full of plants that have taken on humanoid shapes. Josie theorizes that the Shimmer distorts and transforms everything within its boundaries the way a prism refracts light — including the expedition members' own DNA. Anya is overcome with paranoia after watching her fingerprints change. She ties the other team members to chairs, and accuses Lena of murdering Cassie. The mutant bear returns and lures Anya away by emitting a cry for help in Cassie's voice. The bear kills Anya, while Josie frees herself and shoots it.

Ventress reveals she has cancer and is nearing death. She leaves the group and heads for the lighthouse at the center of the Shimmer. Josie believes the Shimmer "refracted" Cassie's dying mind into the bear, and laments how only Cassie's pain and fear remained. She allows herself to succumb to the Shimmer and "refract" into a humanoid plant to avoid a similar fate. Lena follows Ventress to the lighthouse, where she discovers Kane's remains and a videotape. In the footage, Kane instructs someone to find Lena before killing himself with a phosphorus grenade. After the explosion, a Doppelgänger of Kane steps into frame.

Within the hole created by the meteor, Lena finds Ventress, who explains that the Shimmer will swallow everything, and then she disintegrates into a shimmering cloud. The cloud absorbs a drop of blood from Lena's face and changes into a faceless humanoid that mimics Lena's movements. Unable to outrun the creature, which is slowly transforming into her Doppelgänger, Lena tricks it into igniting one of Kane's leftover grenades. Lena flees the burning lighthouse, and the Shimmer dissipates, destroying itself.

Back in the present, Lena's interrogation concludes. She learns that after the Shimmer fell, Kane's condition began to stabilize. Lena visits Kane and asks if he is really Kane. He asks if she is Lena, but she does not answer. They embrace and their irises shimmer.

== Cast ==
- Natalie Portman as Lena
- Jennifer Jason Leigh as Dr. Ventress
- Gina Rodriguez as Anya Thorensen
- Tessa Thompson as Josie Radek
- Tuva Novotny as Cassie "Cass" Sheppard
- Oscar Isaac as Kane
- Benedict Wong as Lomax
- Sonoya Mizuno as Katie (medical student)
  - Mizuno also provided the motion-capture performance for "Humanoid"
- David Gyasi as Daniel

== Production ==
=== Development ===
Paramount Pictures and Scott Rudin acquired the film rights to Annihilation, the then-unpublished first novel in Jeff VanderMeer's Southern Reach Trilogy, on March 26, 2013. Rudin and Eli Bush were set to produce the film, and Alex Garland, who had previously worked with Rudin and Bush on Ex Machina, was hired to write and direct the film in October 2014.

Garland explained that his adaptation was necessarily based on only the first novel in the trilogy: "At the point I started working on Annihilation, there was only one of the three books. I knew that it was planned as a trilogy by the author, but there was only the manuscript for the first book. I really didn't think too much about the trilogy side of it."

Garland said his adaptation is "a memory of the book", rather than book-referenced screenwriting, with the intention of capturing the "dreamlike nature" and tone of his experience reading VanderMeer's novel. Rather than trying to directly adapt the book, Garland deliberately took the story in his own direction, with VanderMeer's permission. Garland did not read the other two books when they were completed, as he was concerned he would need to revise his script. When others informed him of elements of the sequels, he expressed surprise at some of the similarities to what he had written.

Some critics have noted the film has similarities with Arkady and Boris Strugatsky's 1972 science-fiction novel Roadside Picnic and Andrei Tarkovsky's 1979 film adaptation, Stalker. Nerdist Industries' Kyle Anderson noted an even stronger resemblance to the 1927 short story "The Colour Out of Space" by H. P. Lovecraft (also adapted for the screen on several occasions, including Color Out of Space in 2019), which is about a meteorite that lands in a swamp and unleashes a mutagenic plague. In his review, Chris McCoy of the Memphis Flyer found Annihilation to be reminiscent of both The Colour Out of Space and Roadside Picnic/Stalker. VanderMeer stated that the original novel "is 100% NOT a tribute to Picnic/Stalker", but rather drew influences from works by J. G. Ballard and Franz Kafka. At least Alex Garland seems to have been influenced by J. G. Ballard's book The Crystal World. Ventress, Radek, and Thorensen are names of characters in both the movie and in The Crystal World.

=== Casting ===
The first cast member to join Annihilation was Natalie Portman, who entered negotiations with Paramount in May 2015, under the agreement that production not begin until 2016. Once Portman had agreed to play the biologist, the next cast member added was Gina Rodriguez, who entered talks with the studio in November 2015. By that point, production was set to begin in early 2016, a decision made to accommodate Portman's schedule, but which also meant that the film would be shot during Rodriguez's break from filming Jane the Virgin. Oscar Isaac, who had previously worked with Garland in Ex Machina, joined the cast in March 2016 as the husband of Portman's character. By the end of April, Tessa Thompson, Jennifer Jason Leigh, and David Gyasi were also attached to the project.

In the Southern Reach novels, the biologist is described as being of Asian descent and the psychologist is mixed-race and half-Indigenous. As Portman and Leigh were cast in those roles, in 2018, the Media Action Network for Asian Americans and the American Indians in Film and Television advocacy groups accused Garland of whitewashing. Garland responded by saying, "nothing [was] cynical or conspiratorial" about the casting, and that the book in which the characters' races are revealed, Authority, had not been released when Annihilation was written and cast. Portman also responded to the controversy, saying that she did not know her character had a specific ethnicity until whitewashing concerns were raised, and that Garland had intentionally not spoken to VanderMeer about the other two Southern Reach novels because he wanted to focus on adapting Annihilation.

=== Filming ===
Principal photography for the film was underway by April 2016, when actor David Gyasi was added to the cast. Lighthouse Pictures Ltd started location filming in late April in South Forest, Windsor Great Park. Some test shooting had been done in St. Marks, Florida, but the vegetation in the area turned out to be too dense to give any depth perception on screen. On May 9, 2016, cinematographer Rob Hardy began sharing pictures from the set of the film. On July 13 and 14, filming took place at Holkham Pines in North Norfolk. Shooting was completed that month.

The visual-effects team was made up of many of Garland's collaborators from Ex Machina, including VFX supervisor Andrew Whitehurst, main visual-effects company DNEG, and Milk VFX, plus special makeup effects by Tristan Versluis.

== Release ==
Due to a poorly received test screening, David Ellison, a financier and producer at Skydance, became concerned that the film was "too intellectual" and "too complicated", and demanded changes to make it appeal to a wider audience, including making Portman's character more sympathetic, and changing the ending. Producer Scott Rudin sided with the director, who did not want to alter the film. Rudin, who had final cut privilege, defended the film and refused to take notes from Ellison.

In a December 7, 2017, announcement, due to the clashes between Rudin and Ellison and the shift in Paramount's leadership, a deal had been struck allowing Netflix to distribute the film internationally. According to this deal, Paramount would handle the American, Canadian, and Chinese release, while Netflix would begin streaming the film in other territories 17 days later.

The film was released theatrically in the United States on February 23, 2018, by Paramount Pictures, and digitally in other markets on March 12, 2018, by Netflix. Garland expressed his disappointment with the decision to coincide digital distribution with theatrical, saying, "We made the film for cinema." On January 5, 2019, the film was released digitally on Netflix's competitor Hulu.

Annihilation was released on Digital HD on May 22, 2018, and on Ultra HD Blu-ray, Blu-ray, and DVD on May 29.

== Reception ==
=== Box office ===
Annihilation grossed $32.7 million in the United States and Canada and $10.3 million in China, for a worldwide total of $43.1 million, against a production budget of $40–55 million. While it did not amass much in terms of box office, the film found new life in home release, with some publications arguing it could become a cult classic.

In the United States, the film was released alongside Game Night and Every Day, and was projected to gross $10–12 million from 2,012 theaters during its opening weekend. It made $3.9 million on its first day (including $900,000 from Thursday-night previews at 1,850 theaters), and ended up making $11 million over the weekend, finishing fourth, behind Black Panther, Game Night, and Peter Rabbit. Its second weekend, the film dropped 49% to $5.9 million, falling to sixth place.

=== Critical response ===
On film review aggregator website Rotten Tomatoes, the film has an approval rating of 88% based on 331 reviews, and an average score of 7.7/10; the site's "critics consensus" reads: "Annihilation backs up its sci-fi visual wonders and visceral genre thrills with an impressively ambitious—and surprisingly strange—exploration of challenging themes that should leave audiences pondering long after the end credits roll." On Metacritic, the film has a weighted average score of 79 out of 100 based on reviews from 51 critics, indicating "generally favorable" reviews. Audiences polled by CinemaScore gave the film an average grade of "C" on an A+ to F scale, and PostTrak reported filmgoers gave it a 71% overall positive score.

Richard Roeper of the Chicago Sun-Times gave the film four out of four stars, praising it for taking risks, and saying: "Kudos to Garland and the cast, but bravo to Scott Rudin, as well. Apparently, you knew a masterpiece when you saw it, and you made sure we were able to see it, as well." Writing for Rolling Stone, Peter Travers complimented the cast and Garland's writing and direction, giving the film three and a half stars out of four, and saying: "Garland need make no apologies for Annihilation. It's a bracing brainteaser with the courage of its own ambiguity. You work out the answers in your own head, in your own time, in your own dreams, where the best sci-fi puzzles leave things." The Economist described the film as "tightrope-walking the fine line between open-ended, mind-expanding mystery and lethargic, pretentious twaddle", but praised its final half hour.

As part of his annual end-of-year list of favorite songs, books, and movies, former United States President Barack Obama listed Annihilation as one of his favorite films of 2018.

Critics have referred to the film as a sci-fi horror thriller, and some have said that this combination defies traditional genres and makes it part of the New Weird.

In 2025, it was one of the films voted for the "Readers' Choice" edition of The New York Times' list of "the 100 Best Movies of the 21st Century," finishing at number 289.
