= The Time Traveler's Almanac =

2013 short story collection

- Genre: Fantasy, sci-fi
- Publisher: Tor Books
- Publication date: March 18, 2014
- Pages: 960
- ISBN: 978-0-7653-7424-0

The Time Traveler's Almanac (British title: The Time Traveller's Almanac) is a 2013 anthology edited by Ann and Jeff VanderMeer. It contains stories that focus on time travel. It was released in November 2013 in the UK and on March 18, 2014, in the US.

== Background ==
Regarding the motivation behind Time Traveler's Almanac, Ann VanderMeer said that there were two main reasons. First was that Ann and Jeff needed "a break from the seriousness of The Weird." Secondly, they felt they could offer something different from existing time travel anthologies.

== Contents ==
Sixty-five short stories and five essays are featured in The Time Traveler's Almanac.

=== Fiction ===
Stories are listed in alphabetical order by author.

1. "Young Zaphod Plays It Safe" by Douglas Adams
2. "Terminós" by Dean Francis Alfar
3. "What If—" by Isaac Asimov
4. "Noble Mold" by Kage Baker
5. "A Night on the Barbary Coast" by Kage Baker
6. "Life Trap" by Barrington J. Bayley
7. "This Tragic Glass" by Elizabeth Bear
8. "Enoch Soames: A Memory of the Eighteen-Nineties" by Max Beerbohm
9. "The Most Important Thing in the World" by Steve Bein
10. "In The Tube" by E. F. Benson
11. "The Mask of the Rex" by Richard Bowes
12. "A Sound of Thunder" by Ray Bradbury
13. "Bad Timing" by Molly Brown
14. "The Gulf of the Years" by Georges-Olivier Châteaureynaud
15. "The Threads of Time" by C. J. Cherryh
16. "Thirty Seconds From Now" by John Chu
17. "Palindromic" by Peter Crowther
18. "Domine" by Rjurik Davidson
19. "The Lost Continent" by Greg Egan
20. "The Gernsback Continuum" by William Gibson
21. "3 RMS, Good View" by Karen Haber
22. "Message in a Bottle" by Nalo Hopkinson
23. "The Great Clock" by Langdon Jones
24. "Hwang's Billion Brilliant Daughters" by Alice Sola Kim
25. "On the Watchtower at Plataea" by Garry Kilworth
26. "Time Gypsies" by Ellen Klages
27. "Vintage Season" by Henry Kuttner & C. L. Moore
28. "At Dorado" by Geoffrey A. Landis
29. "Ripples in the Dirac Sea" by Geoffrey Landis
30. "The Final Days" by David Langford
31. "Fish Night" by Joe Lansdale
32. "As Time Goes By" by Tanith Lee
33. "Another Story" by Ursula K. Le Guin
34. "Loob" by Bob Leman
35. "Alexia and Graham Bell" by Rosaleen Love
36. "Traveller's Rest" by David I. Masson
37. "Death Ship" by Richard Matheson
38. "Under Siege" by George R. R. Martin
39. "The Clock That Went Backwards" by Edward Page Mitchell
40. "Pale Roses" by Michael Moorcock
41. "The House that Made the Sixteen Loops of Time" by Tamsyn Muir
42. "Is There Anybody There?" by Kim Newman
43. "Come-From-Aways" by Tony Pi
44. "The Time Telephone" by Adam Roberts
45. "Red Letter Day" by Kristine Kathryn Rusch
46. "The Waitabits" by Eric Frank Russell
47. "If Ever I Should Leave You" by Pamela Sargent
48. "How the Future Got Better" by Eric Schaller
49. "Needle in a Timestack" by Robert Silverberg
50. "Delhi" by Vandana Singh
51. "Himself in Anachron" by Cordwainer Smith
52. "The Weed of Time" by Norman Spinrad
53. "Palimpsest" by Charlie Stross
54. "Yesterday Was Monday" by Theodore Sturgeon
55. "Triceratops Summer" by Michael Swanwick
56. "The Mouse Ran Down" by Adrian Tchaikovsky
57. "Augusta Prima" by Karin Tidbeck
58. "Twenty-One and Counting Up" by Harry Turtledove
59. "Forty, Counting Down" by Harry Turtledove
60. "Where or When" by Steven Utley
61. "Swing Time" by Carrie Vaughn
62. excerpt from The Time Machine by H. G. Wells
63. "Fire Watch" by Connie Willis
64. "Against the Lafayette Escadrille" by Gene Wolfe
65. "The Lost Pilgrim" by Gene Wolfe

=== Non-fiction ===
1. "Introduction" by Rian Johnson
2. "Music for Time Travelers" by Jason Heller
3. "Time Travel in Theory and Practice" by Stan Love
4. "Trousseau: Fashion for Time Travelers" by Genevieve Valentine
5. "Top Ten Tips for Time Travelers" by Charles Yu
