= Steampunk (anthology) =

Short story collection edited by Ann and Jeff VanderMeer

- Author: Ann & Jeff VanderMeer
- Cover artist: Ann Monn
- Language: English
- Genre: Steampunk
- Publisher: Tachyon
- Publication date: 1 May 2008
- Publication place: United States
- Media type: Print (Paperback)
- Pages: 400 pp
- ISBN: 978-1-892391-75-9
- OCLC: 182733030

Steampunk (2008) is an anthology of steampunk fiction edited by Ann and Jeff VanderMeer, and published by Tachyon Publications. It was nominated in 2009, for a World Fantasy Award.

== Contents ==
- “Preface: Steampunk: “It’s a Clockwork Universe, Victoria”” by Ann & Jeff VanderMeer
- “Introduction: The 19th-Century Roots of Steampunk” by Jess Nevins
- “Benediction: Excerpt from The Warlord of the Air” by Michael Moorcock
- “Lord Kelvin’s Machine” by James P. Blaylock
- “The Giving Mouth” by Ian R. MacLeod
- “A Sun in the Attic” by Mary Gentle
- “The God-Clown Is Near” by Jay Lake
- “The Steam Man of the Prairie and the Dark Rider Get Down: A Dime Novel” by Joe R. Lansdale
- “The Selene Gardening Society” by Molly Brown
- “Seventy-Two Letters” by Ted Chiang
- “The Martian Agent, A Planetary Romance” by Michael Chabon
- “Victoria” by Paul Di Filippo
- “Reflected Light” by Rachel E. Pollock (misprinted as Rachel Pollack in the first edition printing)
- “Minutes of the Last Meeting” by Stepan Chapman
- “Excerpt from the Third and Last Volume of Tribes of the Pacific Coast” by Neal Stephenson
- “The Steam-Driven Time Machine: A Pop Culture Survey” by Rick Klaw
- “The Essential Sequential Steampunk: A Modest Survey of the Genre within the Comic Book Medium” by Bill Baker
