= Acceptance (novel) =

2014 novel by Jeff VanderMeer

- Author: Jeff VanderMeer
- Language: English
- Series: Southern Reach Series
- Genre: Fantasy, Horror, Science fiction
- Publisher: Farrar, Straus and Giroux
- Publication date: September 2, 2014
- Publication place: United States
- Media type: Print
- Pages: 341
- ISBN: 978-0-374-10411-5
- Preceded by: Authority
- Followed by: Absolution

Acceptance is a 2014 novel by Jeff VanderMeer. It is the third in a series of four books called the Southern Reach Series. It was released in the US on September 2, 2014.

== Plot summary ==
=== Background ===
Acceptance jumps around in time and between perspectives involving several characters from the first two novels in the Southern Reach Series.

Annihilation, the first book in the series, was focused on a character known as the biologist who was part of a team, the "twelfth expedition", that entered Area X, a restricted and uninhabited zone known for having anomalous events, which is controlled by a government organization called the Southern Reach. After being exposed to strange spores, she began a mysterious mental and sensory shift she calls "brightness". She investigated Area X, with an emphasis on an abandoned lighthouse which may have been the beginning site of its strange events.

Authority, the second book in the series, followed the character John "Control" Rodriguez. The newly appointed director of the Southern Reach, he was tasked with interviewing the biologist, who escaped from Area X and prefers to be called "Ghost Bird". Later he determined Ghost Bird was not the biologist, but a duplicate of her which began germinating in Area X. When Area X began to grow beyond its boundaries, Rodriguez and Ghost Bird jumped through a portal into it.

=== The lighthouse keeper ===
In a past time just before Area X emerges, Saul Evans, a lighthouse keeper (briefly introduced in Annihilation) builds a friendship with nine-year-old Gloria, the girl who later becomes director of the Southern Reach and psychologist on the twelfth expedition. While maintaining the lighthouse (the same one found in Area X), Saul is frustrated by the constant visits of Henry and Suzanne, two members of the Séance & Science Brigade (S&SB), which performs unknown scientific or pseudo-scientific experiments on the lighthouse's lens. Later, a fire breaks out on nearby Failure Island, destroying S&SB's headquarters. While cleaning the grounds, Saul sees a mysterious flower of light on the floor. As he attempts to pluck it, it pricks his finger. Saul begins to have vivid nightmares: he imagines walking into his lighthouse only to discover it has transformed into the Tower (an underground spiraling tunnel from the first book). When he awakens, Saul begins reciting the incantation later written by the Crawler on the walls of the Tower. Over time Saul becomes increasingly obsessed with the incantation.

Gloria leaves to be with her father just before Saul returns to the lighthouse at night and sees a glowing light emanating from the trapdoor beside the lens. Saul enters the light. When he awakens, he finds Henry and Suzanne's bodies beside him. However, a doppelgänger of Henry arrives and confronts Saul. He grabs Henry and the two fall over the railing of the lighthouse. Saul survives, but as he attempts to escape, visions of Area X flood his mind. Saul finally stops running, having accepted defeat. A tunnel, later referred to by expedition members as the Tower, forms at the site where Saul falls. Saul becomes the Crawler which scrawls the organic words which descend through the Tower.

=== The psychologist/director ===
The second timeline describes Gloria's initial acceptance into the Southern Reach and her promotion to director. She has a strained relationship with Lowry, the only survivor of the first expedition and the man responsible for organizing each subsequent journey into Area X. Without alerting anyone at the Southern Reach, Gloria secretly crosses the border into Area X with Whitby, a scientist working for the Southern Reach. She visits her childhood home, encounters the Crawler in the Tower, and visits the lighthouse. While Whitby is upstairs, he apparently (unseen to the director) struggles with his duplicate and says that he killed it just before she rushed up to find him bruised and scratched, with no sign of the Dead Whitby. The Director finds a backpack Whitby swears belonged to Dead Whitby containing the cell phone and plant (first mentioned in Authority).

Upon her return, the director refuses to relate her experiences to Lowry. Instead, she begins planning the twelfth expedition and interviews the biologist for the mission. Due to having terminal cancer, the director decides to join the twelfth expedition in the hopes of visiting Area X one last time. She also learns that the S&SB may have been involved in the creation of Area X. When she confronts Lowry about this, he refuses to admit it. Finally, the director pulls out a photo of the cell phone she found in Area X, arguing that it belonged to Lowry and was used to communicate with Area X. The director believes that Area X is trying to communicate with Lowry because it has been found in such a serendipitous way, and Lowry eventually admits the phone belonged to him and storms off. The director's story ends with her embarking on the twelfth expedition with a letter to Saul Evans in her pocket, which she hopes to give him when they meet again. However (as seen in Annihilation) the director dies before Saul can receive her message: an apology for never returning to the lighthouse as a child, thanks for his friendship and guidance, and a promise always to remember him as the Keeper of the Light.

=== Control and Ghost Bird ===
Control, the current director of the Southern Reach, and Ghost Bird, the self-admitted doppelgänger of the twelfth expedition's biologist, enter Area X through a previously unknown portal. They wander in the wilderness before arriving at Failure Island, where they encounter Grace Stevenson (the assistant director of the Southern Reach, whom Control previously worked with). She fled the agency after killing a doppelgänger and fleeing with a group of personnel into Area X. Grace reveals that time moves faster inside the border than regularly on planet Earth due to specific "cosmic" shifts that seem to occur randomly. Although Control and Ghost Bird have only been gone a few weeks, Grace has been waiting on the island for three years. (This also accounts for how some expeditions never return, as they may have been trapped there for years and eventually died.) Grace also shows them the biologist's "last will and testament", her journal detailing what happened to her (after the events of Annihilation): she too arrived at the island, searching for her husband, believing that the man who returned from the eleventh expedition was a copy of her husband generated by Area X. The biologist instead encountered an owl that became her companion for the next thirty years. Over time she came to believe that the owl was the form that her husband took after he was changed by Area X. She held off total takeover by her inner "brightness", using pain as a way for her body to resist it, and believed that her eventual change would likely be more radical, perhaps into something like the moaning creature (from Annihilation). Eventually, the owl died, and the brightness that afflicted the biologist swallowed her whole.

Back in the present, Grace announces that this original biologist is now returning to the island. Ghost Bird — herself a copy of the biologist generated by Area X — soon encounters this original self, transformed into a staggeringly immense, hyper-sentient, whale-like creature covered with eyes. Control, Ghost Bird, and Grace decide to return to the Tower, where Ghost Bird encounters the Crawler. When she touches it, she sees the birth of Area X as if it is its own universe. Grace shoots Ghost Bird, who is completely unharmed. Meanwhile, Control, overcome by the brightness himself, is transforming into something nonhuman, a loping creature with paws. He descends further into the Tower. As he comes closer to the light at the bottom of the Tower, he realizes that it is the flower that pricked Saul and created Area X. He leaps into the light. Grace and Ghost Bird exit the Tower and head to the border. Ghost Bird is ambivalent about the possible total expansion of Area X but is mindful of Grace and her maintained connection to loved ones outside of Area X. They find the Southern Reach building abandoned. The two continue walking, unsure if Area X is gone or if the border has expanded even further.

== Reception ==
On March 15, 2014, BuzzFeed gave an exclusive first look at the cover to Acceptance along with an interview with Jeff VanderMeer. Reviews for Acceptance were for the most part favorable. NPR said that the book "is at different times the best haunted lighthouse story ever written, a deeply unsettling tale of first contact, a book about death, a book about obsession and loss, a book about the horrifying experience of confronting an intelligence far greater and far stranger than our own, and a book about sea monsters." The Guardian called it a potent conclusion to the trilogy, while Kirkus gave the work a starred review.

During its opening week, Acceptance was ranked as #16 on the New York Times bestseller list for Paperback Trade Fiction. The New York Times wrote a full page review calling the book "pure reading pleasure" and added that "VanderMeer has created an immersive and wonderfully realized world."
