= L. Timmel Duchamp =

American writer (born 1950)

- Born: 1950 (age 75–76)
- Occupation: Writer
- Writing career
- Genre: Science fiction
- Notable work: Alanya to Alanya

L. Timmel Duchamp (born 1950) is an American author of science fiction. She is also an editor for Aqueduct Press.

== Biography ==
Duchamp is often grouped together with Kelly Link and other contemporary women authors who use genres like fantasy, horror, and science fiction to explore themes of feminism and gender politics. Until recently Duchamp's output focused primarily on short stories and critical essays, with publications in anthologies such as The Thackery T. Lambshead Pocket Guide to Eccentric & Discredited Diseases and magazines including Asimov's Science Fiction.

Her first novel, Alanya to Alanya, was released in June 2005. First in a series of five books dubbed the Marq'ssan Cycle, Alanya to Alanya is set on a near-future earth controlled by a male-dominated ruling class patterned loosely after the corporate world of today. The Marq'ssan, an advanced race of aliens, bring business as usual to a screeching halt all over the world by disabling technology and aiding groups willing to fight for independence from the power structure. The main character is Kay Zeldin, a history professor who has a history of working for the government. But as she works for the government she becomes more and more convinced to follow the Marq'ssans.

== Selected bibliography ==
- "O's Story". Memories And Visions: Women's Fantasy and Science Fiction. ed. Susanna Sturgis, Crossing Press, 1989
- "Transcendence". Starshore. Vol. 1, no. 2, Fall 1990.
- "Things of the Flesh". Asimov's Science Fiction. January 1994.
- "A Portrait of the Artist as a Middle-Aged Woman". Leviathan 2, ed. Jeff VanderMeer and Rose Secrest, Ministry of Whimsy, April 1998.
- "Motherhood, Etc." Flying Cups and Saucers: Gender Explorations in Science Fiction & Fantasy, ed. Debbie Notkin & The Secret Feminist Cabal, Edgewood Press, 1998.
- "Vestigial Elongation of the Caudal Vertebrae". The Thackery T. Lambshead Pocket Guide to Eccentric & Discredited Diseases. eds Jeff VanderMeer and Mark Roberts. Nightshade Books, November 2003)
- The Grand Conversation. Aqueduct Press.
- Love's Body, Dancing in Time. Aqueduct Press, April 2004.
- Alanya to Alanya: Book One of the Marq'ssan Cycle. Aqueduct Press: June 2005.
- The Red Rose Rages (Bleeding). Aqueduct Press: December 2005.
- Renegade: Book Two of the Marq'ssan Cycle. Aqueduct Press: June 2006.
- Tsunami: Book Three of the Marq'ssan Cycle. Aqueduct Press: January 2007.
- Never at Home. Aqueduct Press, 2011. ISBN 9781933500744 [seven stories]
- Editor: Missing Links and Secret Histories: A Selection of Wikipedia Entries from Across the Known Multiverse. Aqueduct Press: Spring 2013. ISBN 9781619760394
- Blood in the Fruit: Book Four of the Marq'ssan Cycle. Aqueduct Press: January 2008.
- Stretto: Book Five of the Marq'ssan Cycle. Aqueduct Press: July 2008.

== Awards ==
- 2017 World Fantasy Award for Special Award, Professional for Aqueduct Press
