= The Weird =

2011 book ed. by Ann and Jeff VanderMeer

The Weird: A Compendium of Strange and Dark Stories
- Author: Ann and Jeff VanderMeer (editors)
- Language: English
- Genre: Weird fiction
- Publisher: Corvus
- Publication date: 31 Oct 2010
- Publication place: United States
- Media type: Hardcover, paperback, e-book
- Pages: 1,126 (1,152 in paperback)
- ISBN: 9780765333605

The Weird: A Compendium of Strange and Dark Stories is an anthology of weird fiction edited by Ann and Jeff VanderMeer.

Published on 30 Oct 2011, it contains 110 short stories, novellas and short novels. At 1,126 pages in the hardcover edition, it is probably the largest single volume of fantastic fiction ever published, according to Locus.

== Contents ==
The editors' objective in publishing The Weird was to provide a comprehensive definition of "the Weird", a type of fiction that their introduction describes as "as much a sensation", through its contents—one of terror and wonder—"as (...) a mode of writing", and as a type of fiction that entertains while also expressing readers' dissatisfaction with, and uncertainty about, reality. To that end, The Weird includes works that range from fantasy, science fiction and mainstream literature "with a slight twist of strange", but it also amounts, according to The Guardian, to "a history of the horror story".

The editors limited their chronologically ordered collection to fiction from the twentieth and twenty-first centuries, deliberately avoiding stories focusing on tropes of the horror genre such as zombies, vampires, and werewolves, to highlight what they considered the Weird's innovative qualities. To cover the genre comprehensively, they commissioned original translations of, among others, works by Ryūnosuke Akutagawa, Michel Bernanos, Julio Cortázar and Georg Heym.

The anthology contains the following works:

- Foreweird by Michael Moorcock
- Introduction by Ann and Jeff VanderMeer
- Alfred Kubin, The Other Side (excerpt), 1909 (translation, Austria)
- F. Marion Crawford, The Screaming Skull, 1908
- Algernon Blackwood, The Willows, 1907
- Saki, Sredni Vashtar, 1910
- M. R. James, Casting the Runes, 1911
- Lord Dunsany, How Nuth Would Have Practiced his Art, 1912
- Gustav Meyrink, The Man in the Bottle, 1912 (translation, Austria)
- Georg Heym, The Dissection, 1913 (new translation, Germany)
- Hanns Heinz Ewers, The Spider, 1908 (translation, Germany)
- Rabindranath Tagore, The Hungry Stones, 1916 (India)
- Luigi Ugolini, The Vegetable Man, 1917 (first translation, Italy)
- A. Merritt, The People of the Pit, 1918
- Ryunosuke Akutagawa, The Hell Screen, 1917 (new translation, Japan)
- Francis Stevens (Gertrude Barrows Bennett), Unseen—Unfeared, 1919
- Franz Kafka, In the Penal Colony, 1919 (translation, German/Czech)
- Stefan Grabinski, The White Weyrak, 1921 (translation, Poland)
- H. F. Arnold, The Night Wire, 1926
- H. P. Lovecraft, The Dunwich Horror, 1929
- Margaret Irwin, The Book, 1930
- Jean Ray, The Mainz Psalter, 1930 (translation, Belgium)
- Jean Ray, The Shadowy Street, 1931 (translation, Belgium)
- Clark Ashton Smith, Genius Loci, 1933
- Hagiwara Sakutaro, The Town of Cats, 1935 (translation, Japan)
- Hugh Walpole, The Tarn, 1936
- Bruno Schulz, Sanatorium Under the Sign of the Hourglass, 1937 (translation, Poland)
- Robert Barbour Johnson, Far Below, 1939
- Fritz Leiber, Smoke Ghost, 1941
- Leonora Carrington, White Rabbits, 1941
- Donald Wollheim, Mimic, 1942
- Ray Bradbury, The Crowd, 1943
- William Sansom, The Long Sheet, 1944
- Jorge Luis Borges, The Aleph, 1945 (translation, Argentina)
- Olympe Bhely-Quenum, A Child in the Bush of Ghosts, 1949 (Benin)
- Shirley Jackson, The Summer People, 1950
- Margaret St. Clair, The Man Who Sold Rope to the Gnoles, 1951
- Robert Bloch, The Hungry House, 1951
- Augusto Monterroso, Mister Taylor, 1952 (new translation, Guatemala)
- Amos Tutuola, The Complete Gentleman, 1952 (Nigeria)
- Jerome Bixby, It's a Good Life, 1953
- Julio Cortázar, Axolotl, 1956 (new translation, Argentina)
- William Sansom, A Woman Seldom Found, 1956
- Charles Beaumont, The Howling Man, 1959
- Mervyn Peake, Same Time, Same Place, 1963
- Dino Buzzati, The Colomber, 1966 (new translation, Italy)
- Michel Bernanos, The Other Side of the Mountain, 1967 (new translation, France)
- Merce Rodoreda, The Salamander, 1967 (translation, Catalan)
- Claude Seignolle, The Ghoulbird, 1967 (new translation, France)
- Gahan Wilson, The Sea Was Wet As Wet Could Be, 1967
- Daphne Du Maurier, Don't Look Now, 1971
- Robert Aickman, The Hospice, 1975
- Dennis Etchison, It Only Comes Out at Night, 1976
- James Tiptree Jr. (Alice Sheldon), The Psychologist Who Wouldn't Do Terrible Things to Rats, 1976
- Eric Basso, The Beak Doctor, 1977
- Jamaica Kincaid, Mother, 1978 (Antigua and Barbuda/US)
- George R.R. Martin, Sandkings, 1979
- Bob Leman, Window, 1980
- Ramsey Campbell, The Brood, 1980
- Michael Shea, The Autopsy, 1980
- William Gibson / John Shirley, The Belonging Kind, 1981
- M. John Harrison, Egnaro, 1981
- Joanna Russ, The Little Dirty Girl, 1982
- M. John Harrison, The New Rays, 1982
- Premendra Mitra, The Discovery of Telenapota, 1984 (translation, India)
- F. Paul Wilson, Soft, 1984
- Octavia Butler, Bloodchild, 1984
- Clive Barker, In the Hills, the Cities, 1984
- Leena Krohn, Tainaron, 1985 (translation, Finland)
- Garry Kilworth, Hogfoot Right and Bird-hands, 1987
- Lucius Shepard, Shades, 1987
- Harlan Ellison, The Function of Dream Sleep, 1988
- Ben Okri, Worlds That Flourish, 1988 (Nigeria)
- Elizabeth Hand, The Boy in the Tree, 1989
- Joyce Carol Oates, Family, 1989
- Poppy Z Brite, His Mouth Will Taste of Wormwood, 1990
- Michal Ajvaz, The End of the Garden, 1991 (translation, Czech)
- Karen Joy Fowler, The Dark, 1991
- Kathe Koja, Angels in Love, 1991
- Haruki Murakami, The Ice Man, 1991 (translation, Japan)
- Lisa Tuttle, Replacements, 1992
- Marc Laidlaw, The Diane Arbus Suicide Portfolio, 1993
- Steven Utley, The Country Doctor, 1993
- William Browning Spencer, The Ocean and All Its Devices, 1994
- Jeffrey Ford, The Delicate, 1994
- Martin Simpson, Last Rites and Resurrections, 1994
- Stephen King, The Man in the Black Suit, 1994
- Angela Carter, The Snow Pavilion, 1995
- Craig Padawer, The Meat Garden, 1996
- Stepan Chapman, The Stiff and the Stile, 1997
- Tanith Lee, Yellow and Red, 1998
- Kelly Link, The Specialist's Hat, 1998
- Caitlin R. Kiernan, A Redress for Andromeda, 2000
- Michael Chabon, The God of Dark Laughter, 2001
- China Miéville, Details, 2002
- Michael Cisco, The Genius of Assassins, 2002
- Neil Gaiman, Feeders and Eaters, 2002
- Jeff VanderMeer, The Cage, 2002
- Jeffrey Ford, The Beautiful Gelreesh, 2003
- Thomas Ligotti, The Town Manager, 2003
- Brian Evenson, The Brotherhood of Mutilation, 2003
- Mark Samuels, The White Hands, 2003
- Daniel Abraham, Flat Diane, 2004
- Margo Lanagan, Singing My Sister Down, 2005 (Australia)
- T.M. Wright, The People on the Island, 2005
- Laird Barron, The Forest, 2007
- Liz Williams, The Hide, 2007
- Reza Negarestani, The Dust Enforcer, 2008 (Iran)
- Micaela Morrissette, The Familiars, 2009
- Steve Duffy, In the Lion's Den, 2009
- Stephen Graham Jones, Little Lambs, 2009
- K. J. Bishop, Saving the Gleeful Horse, 2010 (Australia)
- Afterweird by China Miéville

The introduction notes that certain stories were not included because of problems with obtaining the reproduction rights, but that the editors considered these stories as an extension of the anthology: Philip K. Dick's The Preserving Machine, J. G. Ballard's The Drowned Giant, Gabriel García Márquez's A Very Old Man with Enormous Wings and Otsuichi's The White House in the Cold Forest.

== Reception ==
The anthology was well received by reviewers from the Financial Times, who called it an "authoritative" representation of weird fiction, the San Francisco Chronicle, who considered that the volume's broad range of authors proved that "the bizarre and unsettling belong to no one race, country or gender" and Publishers Weekly, who characterized it as a "standard-setting compilation" and a "deeply affectionate and respectful history of speculative fiction’s blurry edges".

Locus magazine's reviewer noted that the anthology's chronological order allowed readers to construct a "fossil record" of the Weird's evolution. He wrote that its broad geographical scope made noticeable the distinct traditions of English-language weird fiction, which depict the "eruption of the inexplicable into meticulously ordered realities", and the traditions represented by many translated works, whose cultures are more thoroughly grounded in folklore and mythology, or which resist a Western impulse toward rationalism and realism. Writing for The Guardian in a pastiche of the genre's style, Damien Walter warned of "the madness of the many authors contained in its pages and clearly inhuman determination of its 'editors'", prophesying that "Soon the chrysalid will form, and The Weird itself will burst into the world as a radiant winged moth of metaphysical doom!" The Weird received the British Fantasy Award for best anthology in 2012.
