= Hummingbird Salamander =

2021 novel by Jeff VanderMeer

- Author: Jeff VanderMeer
- Language: English
- Genre: Science fiction, Spy fiction
- Published: 2021 (Macmillan Publishers)
- Publication place: United States
- ISBN: 1250829771

Hummingbird Salamander is a 2021 novel by American author Jeff VanderMeer. It is set in a near-future dystopia affected by climate change, and narrated by a corporate security consultant, "Jane Smith," who is drawn into a mystery incited by her receipt of a taxidermied hummingbird from an extinct species.

== Reception ==
Writer Noah Berlatsky said the novel "features ecoterrorists, evil corporations, a race to defuse doomsday weapons, gunfire, fisticuffs, action sequences and hair-raising escapes... VanderMeer introduces all this genre fun mostly to subvert it". In a New York Times review, author Helen Phillips called the novel "climate fiction at its most urgent and gripping".
