= Absolution (VanderMeer novel) =

2024 novel by Jeff VanderMeer

- Author: Jeff VanderMeer
- Language: English
- Series: Southern Reach series
- Genre: Science fiction; horror; weird fiction
- Publisher: Farrar, Straus and Giroux
- Publication date: October 2024
- Publication place: United States
- Media type: Print
- Pages: 464
- ISBN: 978-0-374-61659-5
- Preceded by: Acceptance

Absolution is a 2024 novel by Jeff VanderMeer, and the fourth entry in the Southern Reach Series. It is both a prequel and sequel to the Southern Reach Series.

== Background ==
The three previous books in the Southern Reach series were written and published within the span of a few months in 2014, and VanderMeer only started thinking about writing Absolution in 2017. VanderMeer claims that the idea for Absolution's plot came to him almost fully formed on 31 July 2023, at which point he wrote continuously until 31 December. He then submitted it to his publisher, who accelerated pre-production steps to shorten the time until it was released.

In the days leading up to the publishing of Absolution, VanderMeer was forced to evacuate from his home in Tallahassee, Florida, due to Hurricane Helene, mirroring the themes of systemic environmental events in Absolution and other books in the series.

== Plot ==
The first part of the novel deals with a man known only as Old Jim. Old Jim was a spy for a shadowy government organization known as Central. After his wife dies and his adult daughter abandons him, his handlers, Jack and Jack's daughter Jackie, bring him back in. His mission is to review an incident involving a team of biologists who were investigating the strange phenomena around a location known as "Active Area X". An alligator that the team brought to study, nicknamed The Tyrant, mysteriously appears and disappears at random with the tracker only sometimes working. The biologists attempt to exterminate strange carnivorous rabbits with biological cameras growing out of their backs, but are stopped by a humanoid being named The Rogue and The Tyrant. The biologists all die or disappear after the incident.

Central assigns an agent to partner up with Old Jim. The agent claims to be his daughter, Cass, but Old Jim believes she is lying. Together they continue to investigate Active Area X but are stymied by the labyrinthine politics of Central, constantly being lied to and caught in the middle of some unknown battle. Old Jim and Cass soon discover that Jack had been using the Active Area X investigations to steal and embezzle money. They are attacked by several groups and individuals. He realizes that Central had him brainwashed but was able to break out of it thanks to a psychic attack by The Rogue. Following clues left by Cass, he traces The Rogue and The Tyrant to the old city hall of Dead Town. In a hidden room, The Tyrant seems to emerge from a puddle on the floor and Old Jim allows it to swallow him whole. At this point, the border goes up around it Active Area X, as Old Jim is sent to the past.

The second part of the book details Central's first doomed expedition into the newly awakened Active Area X. The perspective is a Central operative named Lowry, a foul mouthed angry drug addict. The Southern Reach, the branch of Central tasked with dealing with the region now known as Area X, sends Lowry and twenty three other operatives to find an "off switch" to destroy Area X. Lowry was given a secret task to find Old Jim and recover Jack's stolen money. The expedition members realize that time and space seem to have lost meaning as they lose track of how far they've traveled and how long they were traveling for. One by one they succumb to the dangers of Area X as they head towards a lighthouse that seems to be emitting a green light or substance. As he loses the last vestiges of sanity, he finds a strange molt that resembles the body of a co-worker who was not on the expedition. Despite a sign on the husk saying "Do Not Eat" he succumbs to an overwhelming urge to devour it. He is then shot by the last remaining team member. Though his fate in this book remains uncertain, in the other books he is referred to as the only survivor and takes an upper management role in the Southern Reach.

== Reception ==
Absolution received positive reviews from critics. The Washington Post praised Absolution, stating that despite low expectations, it maintained the same quality as the original trilogy. They note that the book managed to overcome the common issue of horror becoming less effective in longer works. The New York Times generally praised the novel, stating that the opening sections were "some of VanderMeer's best writing." The Los Angeles Times positively compared the horror and grief depicted in the book to the paintings of Hieronymus Bosch, and the Boston Globe described the book as "maddening, haunting, and compelling."
