= Dead Astronauts =

2019 novel by Jeff VanderMeer

- Author: Jeff VanderMeer
- Cover artist: Rodrigo Corral; Alycia Rainaud
- Language: English
- Genre: Science fiction
- Published: 2019
- Publisher: MCD/FSG (US)
- ISBN: 978-0-374-27680-5

Dead Astronauts is a 2019 science fiction novel by Jeff VanderMeer. It is a sequel to Borne but features different characters and a new narrative. It was a finalist for the Locus Award for Best Fantasy Novel and also a finalist for the Dragon Award for Best Fantasy Novel. In the novel, the female astronaut Grayson returns to "The City" after a failed space exploration mission, where she did not manage to locate any habitable planets or other signs of life. Finding her city under the control of "The Company", Grayson flees and joins forces with two other shapeshifters who find their world to be inhospitable. In an attempt to thwart the company's plans, they set out on a journey across multiple timelines and alternate versions of the world.

== Plot ==
The first half of the novel follows three part-human shapeshifters – Grayson, Moss, and Chen – as they travel through worlds to fight "The Company". Grayson, the leader, is a former astronaut that can see iterations of the future and information about others through a blinded eye. After exploring space and finding no habitable planets and no signs of life, she returns to "The City" and finds it transformed by the company. She flees the city and travels west where she encounters and falls in love with Moss. Moss is a sentient moss that takes the form of a person around her companions, but can shapeshift with ease and split into multiple selves. Together Moss and Grayson decide to return to The City and attempt to save it from "The Company". On the way they run into Chen, a creation of The Company who became disillusioned and horrified at the work he was doing and fled. Chen sees the world in equations and formulas, but is always on the verge of collapsing into a mass of salamanders. The three then set out across multiple timelines and versions of the world to try and stop the company.

The second half of the novel follows a homeless woman, Sarah, as she seeks to understand the journal of Charlie X, a scientist of "The Company".

== Reception ==
Dead Astronauts received critical acclaim, even though some reviewers and readers didn't like the novel. Kirkus Reviews said the novel "may be (VanderMeer's) best book yet" while in The Guardian, Nina Allan called Dead Astronauts "genuinely innovative." Allan added, "the author deliberately deconstructs the very concept of familiarity and forces us up against his subject matter in a way that demands we not only engage with it, but recognize its vast importance to our lives and futures.".

Writing in Wired, Emma Grey Ellis said "the story, such as it is, is elusive, given to tangent, to mad jumps in time and universe and perspective. ... Not that that is a criticism, per se. Half-remembered and poorly understood is how VanderMeer’s characters live their lives. It's how they understand the flecks of Earth detritus they find." Writing for NPR, Arkady Martine noted that "clarity is not the point of Dead Astronauts. Ecology is, and fragmentation; connection across species, times, mentalities." Martine added that "Dead Astronauts moves in shutterclicks, shifting points of view and moments in time. The experience of reading it is a compulsively absorbing confusion. Straightforward answers are not forthcoming. The reader assembles what remains of the history of Vandermeer's world by gestalt, layering snatches of imagery one on top of another."

Publishers Weekly, however, called Dead Astronauts "lackluster" and that "This diffuse novel reads like unused notes from Borne and feels incomplete."
