= Borne (novel) =

2017 novel by Jeff VanderMeer

- First edition (US)
- Author: Jeff VanderMeer
- Cover artist: Rodrigo Corral
- Language: English
- Genre: Science fiction
- Publisher: MCD/FSG (US); Fourth Estate (UK)
- Publication date: April 24, 2017
- Publication place: United States
- Media type: Print
- Pages: 336 pp
- ISBN: 978-0-00-815918-4

Borne is a 2017 novel by American writer Jeff VanderMeer. It concerns a post-apocalyptic city setting overrun by biotechnology.

== Plot ==
The novel takes place in the future, in the ruins of a nameless city dominated by a giant grizzly bear called "Mord". The perspective character, Rachel, is a scavenger in the city; she collects various genetically engineered organisms and experiments that were created by "the Company", a biotech firm. One day, while searching in Mord's fur, Rachel discovers a sea anemone-like creature that she names "Borne".

== Background ==
VanderMeer had for a long time considered writing about growing up in the South Pacific, where he lived as a child. One day the image of a sea anemone came to him, along with a hand which he knew belonged to Rachel, that reached out to grab the anemone from the fur of a giant bear. From that image, the rest of the city assembled itself. Mord was influenced by Richard Adams's Shardik, and his never explained ability to fly was inspired by a character in Angela Carter's Nights at the Circus.

== Reception ==
The novel was highly praised, with The Guardian saying "VanderMeer’s recent work has been Ovidian in its underpinnings, exploring the radical transformation of life forms and the seams between them." Publishers Weekly said the novel reads "like a dispatch from a world lodged somewhere between science fiction, myth, and a video game" and that with Borne Vandermeer has transformed weird fiction into "weird literature." The New Yorker said the novel plunges the reader "into a primordial realm of myth, fable, and fairy tale." Cameron Laux in the BBC labels it one of the most overlooked recent novels, imagining "an ecological utopia where humans' abusive relationship with nature has ended."

== Sequels and possible film ==
At one point Borne tells Rachel the story of a Strange Bird when he comes back from one of his explorations of the city, at least to the extent that the survivors in the City think they know the Strange Bird's story.

In August 2017 VanderMeer released the novella The Strange Bird: A Borne Story. The stand-alone story is set in the same world as Borne but features different characters.

VanderMeer also wrote Dead Astronauts, a stand-alone novel set in the Borne universe which was released on December 3, 2019.

Paramount Pictures has optioned the film rights to Borne.
