= Jeff VanderMeer =

American writer (born 1968)

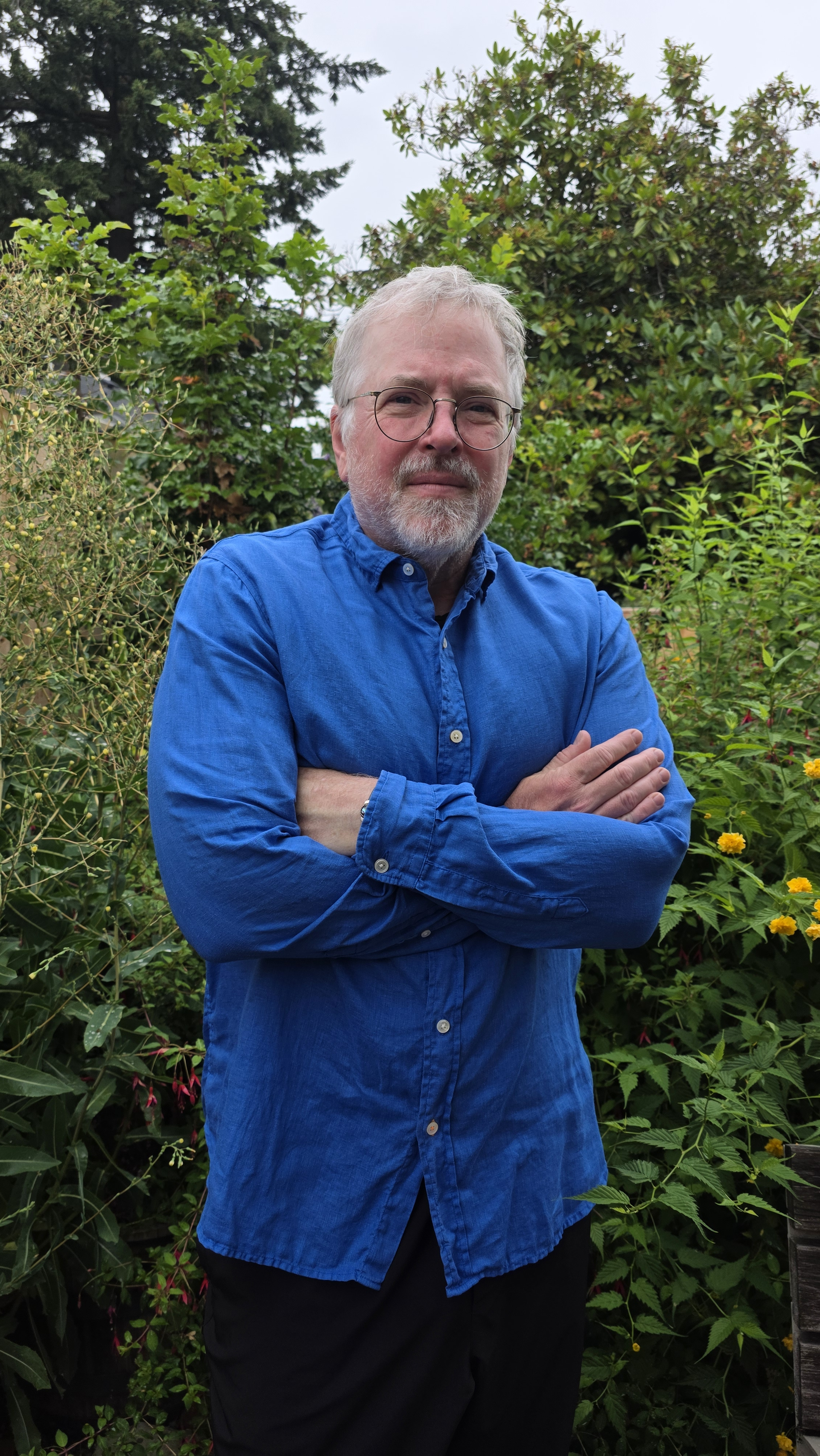
- Jeff VanderMeer (photo by Olivia Quinn, 2026)
- Born: July 7, 1968 (age 58); Bellefonte, Pennsylvania, U.S.
- Occupations: Writer; author; editor; publisher
- Spouse: Ann VanderMeer
- Writing career
- Genres: Speculative fiction Fantasy; Metafiction; Horror; Science fiction Weird fiction
- Notable awards: Nebula Award for Best Novel; Shirley Jackson Award; World Fantasy Award
- Movement: New Weird
- Website: www.jeffvandermeer.com

Jeff VanderMeer (born July 7, 1968) is an American author and literary critic. Initially associated with the New Weird literary genre, before writing his Southern Reach Series. The series' first novel, Annihilation, won the Nebula and Shirley Jackson Awards, and was adapted into a Hollywood film by director Alex Garland. Among VanderMeer's other novels are Shriek: An Afterword and Borne. He has also edited with his ex-wife Ann VanderMeer the anthologies The New Weird, The Weird, and The Big Book of Science Fiction.

VanderMeer has been called "one of the most remarkable practitioners of the literary fantastic in America today," with The New Yorker naming him the "King of Weird Fiction". VanderMeer's fiction is noted for eluding genre classifications even as his works bring in themes and elements from genres such as postmodernism, ecofiction, the New Weird and post-apocalyptic fiction.

== Early life and education ==
VanderMeer was born in Bellefonte, Pennsylvania in 1968, and spent much of his childhood in the Fiji Islands, where his parents worked for the Peace Corps. After returning to the United States, he spent time in Ithaca, New York, and Gainesville, Florida. He attended the University of Florida for three years and, in 1992, took part in the Clarion Writers Workshop.

When VanderMeer was 20, he read Angela Carter's novel The Infernal Desire Machines of Doctor Hoffman, which he has said "blew the back of my head off, rewired my brain: I had never encountered prose like that before, never such passion and boldness on the page." Carter's fiction inspired VanderMeer to both improve and be fearless with his own writing.

== Career ==
=== Writing ===
VanderMeer began writing in the late 1980s while still in high school and quickly became a prolific contributor to small-press magazines. During this time VanderMeer wrote a number of horror and fantasy short stories, some of which were collected in his 1989 self-published book The Book of Frog and in the 1996 collection The Book of Lost Places. He also wrote poetry—his poem "Flight Is for Those Who Have Not Yet Crossed Over" was a co-winner of the 1994 Rhysling Award—and edited two issues of the self-published zine Jabberwocky.

One of VanderMeer's early successes was his 2001 short-story collection City of Saints and Madmen, set in the imaginary city of Ambergris. Several of VanderMeer's novels were subsequently set in the same place, including Shriek: An Afterword (2006) and Finch (2009), the latter of which was a finalist for the Nebula Award for Best Novel. In 2000, his novella The Transformation of Martin Lake won the World Fantasy Award.

VanderMeer has also worked in other media, including on a movie based on his novel Shriek that featured an original soundtrack by rock band The Church. The band Murder By Death likewise recorded a soundtrack for Finch, which was released alongside a limited edition of the book. VanderMeer also wrote a Predator tie-in novel for Dark Horse Comics called Predator: South China Seas and worked with animator Joel Veitch on a Play Station Europe animation of his story "A New Face in Hell".

==== The Southern Reach Series ====
In 2014, Farrar, Straus and Giroux published VanderMeer's Southern Reach Series, consisting of the novels Annihilation, Authority, Acceptance, and Absolution. The story focuses on a secret agency that manages expeditions into a location known as Area X. The area is an uninhabited and abandoned part of the United States that nature has begun to reclaim after a mysterious world-changing event.

VanderMeer has said that the main inspiration for Area X and the series was his hike through St. Marks National Wildlife Refuge. The Other Side of the Mountain by Michel Bernanos is among the books VanderMeer has cited as also having had an influence.

The original trilogy was released in quick succession over an 8-month period, in what has been called an innovative "Netflix-inspired strategy." The strategy helped the second and third books reach the New York Times Bestseller list, and established VanderMeer as "one of the most forward-thinking authors of the decade." Ten years after completing the series, VanderMeer revisited it with Absolution, a prequel novel.

The series ended up being highly honored, with Annihilation winning the Nebula and Shirley Jackson Awards for Best Novel. The entire original trilogy was also named a finalist for the 2015 World Fantasy Award and the 2016 Kurd-Laßwitz-Preis. Annihilation was also adapted into a film of the same name by writer-director Alex Garland. The film stars Natalie Portman, Gina Rodriguez, Tessa Thompson, Jennifer Jason Leigh, and Oscar Isaac.

==== Other fiction writing ====
In 2017 VanderMeer released Borne, a "biotech apocalypse" novel about a scavenger named Rachel trying to survive both a city "plunged into a primordial realm of myth, fable, and fairy tale" and a five-story-tall flying bear named Mord. As with the Southern Reach trilogy, the novel was highly praised, with The Guardian saying, "VanderMeer’s recent work has been Ovidian in its underpinnings, exploring the radical transformation of life forms and the seams between them." Publishers Weekly said the novel reads "like a dispatch from a world lodged somewhere between science fiction, myth, and a video game" and that with Borne Vandermeer has essentially invented a new literary genre, "weird literature."

Paramount Pictures has optioned the film rights to Borne.

In August 2017 VanderMeer released the novella The Strange Bird: A Borne Story. The stand-alone story is set in the same world as Borne but featuring different characters.

Dead Astronauts, a stand-alone short novel set in the Borne universe, was released on December 3, 2019. A stand-alone novel, Hummingbird Salamander, was published on April 6, 2021.

=== Literary criticism and editing ===
VanderMeer is a frequent writer of critical literary reviews and essays, which have appeared in numerous publications including The Atlantic, The Washington Post Book World, Publishers Weekly. For a number of years he was a regular columnist for the Amazon book-culture blog and has served as a judge for the Eisner Awards. He has been a guest speaker at such diverse events as the Brisbane Writers Festival, Finncon in Helsinki, and the American Library Association annual conference.

In 2019, VanderMeer was a judge for the National Book Award for Fiction.

VanderMeer has also edited a number of anthologies. He won a 2003 World Fantasy Award for Leviathan, Volume Three, a collection of genre-bending stories he edited with Forrest Aguirre. He and Mark Roberts were also finalists for the same award the next year for the anthology The Thackery T. Lambshead Pocket Guide to Eccentric & Discredited Diseases.

Most of his recent anthologies have been collaborations with his wife, Ann VanderMeer, the former editor of Weird Tales. These anthologies include The New Weird, a collection of stories from New Weird authors; Last Drink Bird Head, a charity anthology benefiting literacy; The Weird, a World Fantasy Award winning collection of weird fiction; Time Traveler's Almanac, an anthology of time-travel fiction; Fast Ships, Black Sails, a pirate fiction anthology; and the Locus Award winning The Big Book of Science Fiction.

VanderMeer is the founding editor and publisher of the Ministry of Whimsy Press, which he set up in the late 1980s while still in high school. The press is currently an imprint of Wyrm Publishing. One of the Ministry's publications, The Troika by Stepan Chapman, won the Philip K. Dick Award in 1997.

=== Teaching ===
VanderMeer has been involved in teaching creative writing. One of the projects he is involved with is Shared Worlds, an annual two-week program that aims to teach creative writing to teenagers. VanderMeer has taught at the Clarion Workshop and at Trinity Prep School. In addition to his teaching, VanderMeer has written guides to creative writing such as Wonderbook, which won a BSFA Award, a Locus Award, and was nominated for a Hugo and World Fantasy Award.

=== Critical reputation ===
VanderMeer has been called "one of the most remarkable practitioners of the literary fantastic in America today," with The New Yorker naming him the "King of Weird Fiction." VanderMeer's fiction is noted for eluding genre classifications even as his works bring in themes and elements from genres such as postmodernism, ecofiction, the New Weird and post-apocalyptic fiction.

VanderMeer's fiction has been described as "evocative (with) intellectual observations both profound and disturbing" and "lyrical and harrowing," with his mixing of genres producing "something unique and unsettling." His writing has been compared in editorials with the works of Jorge Luis Borges, Franz Kafka, and Henry David Thoreau.

== Personal life ==
In 2003, VanderMeer married Ann Kennedy, then editor for the small Buzzcity Press and Silver Web magazine. They have two cats. One is named Neo. As of 2026, VanderMeer lives in Portland, Oregon.

== Awards ==
VanderMeer has been nominated for the World Fantasy Award 14 times. He has also won an NEA-funded Florida Individual Writers' Fellowship, and, the Le Cafard Cosmique award in France and the Tähtifantasia Award in Finland, both for City of Saints. He has also been a finalist for the Hugo Award, Bram Stoker Award, International Horror Guild Award, Philip K. Dick Award, and many others. Novels such as Veniss Underground and Shriek: An Afterword have made the year's best lists of Amazon.com, The Austin Chronicle, the San Francisco Chronicle, and Publishers Weekly, among others.

Work	Year & Award	Category	Result	Ref.
Flight is for Those Who Have Not Yet Crossed Over	1994 Rhysling Award	Short Poem	Won	
The Bone-Carver's Tale	1996 Asimov's Readers' Poll	Short Story	10th Place	
Dradin, In Love	1997 Theodore Sturgeon Award	Short Science Fiction	Finalist	
The Ministry of Whimsy Press	1998 World Fantasy Special Award—Non-professional		Nominated	
Leviathan 2 (with Rose Secrest)	1999 British Fantasy Award	Anthology	Nominated	
The Legacy of Boccaccio	1999 British Fantasy Award	Anthology	Nominated	
The Transformation of Martin Lake	2000 World Fantasy Award	Novella	Won	
Leviathan 3 (with Forrest Aguirre)	2002 Philip K. Dick Award		Nominated	
Leviathan 3 (with Forrest Aguirre)	2003 Locus Award	Anthology	Nominated	
Leviathan 3 (with Forrest Aguirre)	2003 World Fantasy Award	Anthology	Nominated	
City of Saints and Madmen	2002 Locus Award	Collection	Nominated	
City of Saints and Madmen	2003 World Fantasy Award	Collection	Nominated	
City of Saints and Madmen	2007 Tähtifantasia Award		Won	
The Exchange by Nicholas Sporlender, illustrated by Louis Verden	2002 Locus Award	Short Story	Nominated	
Veniss Underground	2003 International Horror Guild Award	First Novel	Nominated	
Veniss Underground	2003 Bram Stoker Award	First Novel	Nominated	
Veniss Underground	2004 Locus Award	First Novel	Nominated	
Veniss Underground	2004 World Fantasy Award	Novel	Nominated	
The Thackery T. Lambshead Pocket Guide to Eccentric & Discredited Diseases (with Mark Roberts)	2004 Hugo Award	Related Work	Nominated	
The Thackery T. Lambshead Pocket Guide to Eccentric & Discredited Diseases (with Mark Roberts)	2003 International Horror Guild Award	Anthology	Nominated	
The Thackery T. Lambshead Pocket Guide to Eccentric & Discredited Diseases (with Mark Roberts)	2004 World Fantasy Award	Anthology	Nominated	
The Thackery T. Lambshead Pocket Guide to Eccentric & Discredited Diseases (with Mark Roberts)	2004 British Fantasy Award	Anthology	Nominated	
Album Zutique	2004 Locus Award	Anthology	Nominated	
Secret Life	2005 Locus Award	Collection	Nominated	
Three Days in a Border Town	2005 Locus Award	Novelette	Nominated	
The Farmer's Cat	2006 Locus Award	Short Story	Nominated	
Shriek: An Afterword	2007 Locus Award	Fantasy Novel	Nominated	
The Secret Paths of Rajan Khanna	2007 Locus Award	Short Story	Nominated	
The Third Bear	2008 WSFA Small Press Award		Shortlisted	
The Third Bear	2008 Locus Award	Short Story	Nominated	
The Third Bear	2008 Shirley Jackson Award	Short Fiction	Nominated	
The Third Bear (Collection)	2011 Shirley Jackson Award	Collection	Nominated	
The Third Bear (Collection)	2011 Locus Award	Collection	Nominated	
The Third Bear (Collection)	2011 World Fantasy Award	Collection	Nominated	
The Surgeon's Tale	2008 Locus Award	Novelette	Nominated	
The Situation	2009 Shirley Jackson Award	Novelette	Nominated	
Fast Ships, Black Sails (with Ann VanderMeer)	2009 Shirley Jackson Award	Anthology	Nominated	
Fast Ships, Black Sails (with Ann VanderMeer)	2009 Locus Award	Anthology	Nominated	
Fast Ships, Black Sails (with Ann VanderMeer)	2010 FantLab's Book of the Year Award	Anthology	Nominated	
Fixing Hanover	2009 Locus Award	Short Story	Nominated	
Steampunk (with Ann VanderMeer)	2009 Locus Award	Anthology	Nominated	
Steampunk (with Ann VanderMeer)	2009 World Fantasy Award	Anthology	Nominated	
The New Weird (with Ann VanderMeer)	2009 Locus Award	Anthology	Nominated	
Best American Fantasy (with Ann VanderMeer)	2010 Locus Award	Anthology	Nominated	
Finch	2009 Foreword INDIES Awards	Science Fiction & Fantasy	Silver	
Finch	2010 Locus Award	Fantasy Novel	Nominated	
Finch	2010 World Fantasy Award	Novel	Nominated	
Finch	2009 Nebula Award	Novel	Nominated	
Finch	2011 RUSA CODES Reading List	Fantasy	Shortlisted	
The Thackery T. Lambshead Cabinet of Curiosities (with Ann VanderMeer)	2012 Shirley Jackson Award	Anthology	Nominated	
The Thackery T. Lambshead Cabinet of Curiosities (with Ann VanderMeer)	2012 Locus Award	Anthology	Nominated	
The Thackery T. Lambshead Cabinet of Curiosities (with Ann VanderMeer)	2012 World Fantasy Award	Anthology	Nominated	
The Steampunk Bible (with Selena Chambers)	2012 Hugo Award	Related Work	Nominated	
The Steampunk Bible (with Selena Chambers)	2012 World Fantasy Special Award—Professional		Nominated	
The Weird (with Ann VanderMeer)	2012 Locus Award	Anthology	Nominated	
The Weird (with Ann VanderMeer)	2012 World Fantasy Award	Anthology	Won	
The Weird (with Ann VanderMeer)	2012 British Fantasy Award	Anthology	Won	
Weird Fiction Review (with Ann VanderMeer & Adam Mills)	2013 World Fantasy Special Award—Professional award		Nominated	
Wonderbook: The Illustrated Guide to Creating Imaginative Fiction	2013 BSFA Award	Non-Fiction	Won	
Wonderbook: The Illustrated Guide to Creating Imaginative Fiction	2014 Locus Award	Non-Fiction	Won	
Wonderbook: The Illustrated Guide to Creating Imaginative Fiction	2014 Hugo Award	Related Work	Nominated	
Wonderbook: The Illustrated Guide to Creating Imaginative Fiction	2014 World Fantasy Special Award—Professional award		Nominated	
Annihilation	2014 Shirley Jackson Award	Novel	Won	
Annihilation	2014 Goodreads Choice Awards	Science Fiction	Nominated	
Annihilation	2015 Locus Award	SF Novel	Nominated	
Annihilation	2015 RUSA CODES Reading List	Science Fiction	Shortlisted	
Annihilation	2015 Premio Ignotus	Foreign Novel	Nominated	
Annihilation	2014 Nebula Award	Novel	Won	
Annihilation	2015 Kurd Laßwitz Award	Foreign Work	Nominated	
Annihilation	2016 Tähtivaeltaja Award		Nominated	
Authority	2015 Locus Award	SF Novel	Nominated	
Acceptance	2015 Locus Award	SF Novel	Nominated	
The Time Traveler's Almanac (with Ann VanderMeer)	2015 Locus Award	Anthology	Nominated	
Area X: The Southern Reach Trilogy	2015 World Fantasy Award	Novel	Nominated	
Area X: The Southern Reach Trilogy	2015 John W. Campbell Memorial Award		Finalist	
Area X: The Southern Reach Trilogy	2016 Kurd Laßwitz Award	Foreign Work	Nominated	
From Annihilation to Acceptance: A Writer's Surreal Journey	2015 BSFA Award	Non-Fiction	Nominated	
Sisters of the Revolution: A Feminist Speculative Fiction Anthology (with Ann VanderMeer)	2016 Locus Award	Anthology	Nominated	
The Big Book of Science Fiction (with Ann VanderMeer)	2017 Locus Award	Anthology	Won	
Borne	2017 Goodreads Choice Awards	Science Fiction	Nominated	
Borne	2018 Locus Award	SF Novel	Nominated	
Borne	2018 Arthur C. Clarke Award		Finalist	
Borne	2018 John W. Campbell Memorial Award		Finalist	
Borne	2018 Kurd Laßwitz Award	Foreign Work	Nominated	
Borne	2021 Grand Prix de l'Imaginaire	Foreign Novel	Nominated	
Dead Astronauts	2020 Locus Award	Fantasy Novel	Nominated	
Dead Astronauts	2020 Dragon Awards	Fantasy	Nominated	
The Big Book of Classic Fantasy (with Ann VanderMeer)	2020 Locus Award	Anthology	Nominated	
The Big Book of Classic Fantasy (with Ann VanderMeer)	2020 World Fantasy Award	Anthology	Nominated	
The Big Book of Classic Fantasy (with Ann VanderMeer)	2020 British Fantasy Award	Anthology	Nominated	
Hummingbird Salamander	2022 Shirley Jackson Award	Novel	Nominated	
Hummingbird Salamander	2022 Locus Award	SF Novel	Nominated	
A Peculiar Peril	2021 Locus Award	Young Adult Book	Nominated	
A Peculiar Peril	2021 Dragon Awards	Young Adult/Middle Grade	Nominated	
The Big Book of Modern Fantasy (with Ann VanderMeer)	2021 Locus Award	Anthology	Nominated	
The Big Book of Modern Fantasy (with Ann VanderMeer)	2021 World Fantasy Award	Anthology	Won	
Absolution	2024 Goodreads Choice Awards	Science Fiction	Nominated	
Absolution	2024 Los Angeles Times Book Prize	Science Fiction, Fantasy, and Speculative Fiction	Finalist	
Absolution	2025 Locus Award	SF Novel	Nominated	

== Bibliography ==
=== Novels ===
- Dradin, In Love (1996, collected in all editions of City of Saints and Madmen)
- The Hoegbotton Guide to the Early History of Ambergris, by Duncan Shriek (1999, collected in all editions of City of Saints and Madmen)
- Veniss Underground (2003)
- Shriek: An Afterword (2006)
- Predator: South China Sea (2008)
- Finch (2009)
- Southern Reach Series:
  - Annihilation (2014)
  - Authority (2014)
  - Acceptance (2014)
  - Absolution (2024)
  - Abdication (2027)
- Borne (2017)
- Dead Astronauts (2019)
- The Misadventures of Jonathan Lambshead:
  - A Peculiar Peril (2020)
  - A Terrible Trouble (forthcoming)
- Hummingbird Salamander (2021)
- The Stone Shed (forthcoming)

=== Nonfiction ===
- Why Should I Cut Your Throat? (2004)
- Booklife: Strategies and Survival Tips for the 21st Century Writer (2009)
- The Steampunk Bible (2010) (with Selena Chambers)
- Monstrous Creatures: Explorations of Fantasy through Essays, Articles & Reviews (2011)
- Wonderbook: The Illustrated Guide to Creating Imaginative Fiction (2013)
- The Steampunk User's Manual: An Illustrated Practical and Whimsical Guide to Creating Retro-futurist Dreams (2014)

=== Collections ===
- The Book of Frog (1989)
- Lyric of the Highway Mariner: A Collection of Poems (1991)
- The Book of Lost Places (1996)
- City of Saints and Madmen: The Book of Ambergris (2001)
  - City of Saints and Madmen (2002, substantially expanded from the 2001 edition)
  - City of Saints and Madmen (2004, expanded from the 2002 edition)
- The Day Dali Died (2003)
- Secret Life (2004)
- Why Should I Cut Your Throat? (non-fiction, 2004)
- VanderMeer 2005 (promotional sampler, 2005)
- Secret Lives (2006)
- The Surgeon's Tale and Other Stories (with Cat Rambo, 2007)
- The Third Bear (2010, Tachyon Publications)
- The Compass of His Bones and Other Stories (2011)
- Area X: The Southern Reach Trilogy: Annihilation; Authority; Acceptance (2014)

=== Short fiction ===
(Uncollected)

- The Mare Tenebrosum (1988)
- Varlags Are Strange (1989)
- One-Armed Bandit (1989)
- So the Dead Walk Slowly (1989)
- Disintegration (1990)
- Requiem for the Machine (1990)
- Welcome to the Masque (1991)
- Flesh (1991)
- Ex Post Facto (1992)
- Confessions (1992)
- Ghost in the Machine (1995)
- A Report on the Living Dead (A Memoir of the Last Days) (1996)
- David Pangborn Takes A Walk (1996)
- Afterwards, Drowning (1996)
- Afterwards, Burying the Dog (1997)
- Mansions on the Moon (2001)
- An Enthusiastic Foreword by the Editors (2003)
- Tian Shan-Gobi Assimilation (2003)
- How Benjobi Song Came to Rule Iphagenia (2004)
- A New Face in Hell (2007)
- King Tales (2007)
- Island Tales (2008)
- The Situation (2008)
- Why the Vulture is Bald (2008)
- The Mona Lisa (2009) (with Tessa Kum)
- Errata (2010)
- The Three Quests of the Wizard Sarnod (2010)
- The Lizard Dance (2011) (with Gio Clairval)
- Myster Odd Theme Song (Poem) (2011)
- Komodo (2012)
- No Breather in the World but Thee (2013)
- Fragments from the Notes of a Dead Mycologist (2014)
- Marmot Season (2017)
- The Strange Bird (a Borne story) (2017)
- This World is Full of Monsters (2017)
- The Comet Man Book Club Questions (2020)
- Epilogue: Clarity, Now With Hellscape (2020)
- The Leviathan's Tale (2020)
- Wildlife (2022)

=== Other projects ===
- The Kosher Guide to Imaginary Animals (with Ann VanderMeer, 2010, Tachyon Publications)

=== Anthologies edited ===
- Leviathan 1 (with Luke O'Grady, 1994)
- Leviathan 2 (with Rose Secrest, 1998)
- Leviathan 3 (with Forrest Aguirre, 2002)
- Album Zutique (2003)
- The Thackery T. Lambshead Pocket Guide to Eccentric & Discredited Diseases (with Mark Roberts, 2003)
- The New Weird (with Ann VanderMeer, 2007)
- Best American Fantasy (with Ann VanderMeer, 2007)
- Best American Fantasy: v. 2 (with Ann VanderMeer, 2008)
- Last Drink Bird Head, (2008)
- Steampunk (with Ann VanderMeer, 2008)
- Fast Ships, Black Sails, (with Ann VanderMeer, 2009) – Fantasy pirate stories
- Steampunk II: Steampunk Reloaded (2010)
- The Thackery T. Lambshead Cabinet of Curiosities (with Ann VanderMeer, 2011)
- ODD? (with Ann VanderMeer, 2011)
- The Weird (with Ann VanderMeer, 2012)
- The Time Traveler's Almanac (with Ann VanderMeer, 2014)
- Sisters of the Revolution: A Feminist Speculative Fiction Anthology (with Ann VanderMeer, 2015)
- The Big Book of Science Fiction: The Ultimate Collection (with Ann VanderMeer, 2016)
- The Big Book of Classic Fantasy (with Ann VanderMeer, 2019)
- The Big Book of Modern Fantasy (with Ann VanderMeer, 2020)
