= Veniss Underground =

2003 novel by Jeff VanderMeer

- First edition hardback cover
- Author: Jeff VanderMeer
- Language: English
- Genre: Horror, fantasy
- Publisher: Night Shade Books and Prime Books
- Publication date: April 2003
- Publication place: United States
- Media type: Print (hardback & paperback)
- Pages: 200 pp (hardback edition) and 207 pp (paperback edition)
- ISBN: 1-892389-61-4 (hardback edition) and ISBN 1-894815-64-5 (paperback edition)
- OCLC: 53112597

Veniss Underground is a 2003 fantasy novel by American writer Jeff VanderMeer, following the adult lives of three different protagonists across a short period of time in the decadent, surreal city of Veniss, which is situated above a vast underground labyrinth of hovels and mines ruled over by the amoral crime lord Quin.

== Plot summary ==
Veniss Underground alludes in several places to the myth of Orpheus and Eurydice. Like Orpheus, Shadrach descends into the underworld to retrieve his love, Nicola, but here from a cyborg hell, where genetic engineering and DNA splicing create fantastic and horrific creatures. Parallels also exist with Dante's Inferno. Throughout the novel the idea of heaven and hell come into play. Nick looks into the chaotic world in which he tries to find purpose through what is called living art. Nick journeys into the underworld and makes a deal with the "devil", also known as Quin.

As the story progresses, the reader takes on the second person perspective of Nicola and is introduced to a meerkat whom Nicola names Salvador. Salvador (an assassin meerkat sent by Quin) attacks Nicola but she incapacitates him. Nick arrives at Nicola's door and chokes her till she is near death and sent to an organ bank in the underworld. Shadrach comes into play in the third person point of view and takes the initiative of finding his lost love Nicola in the underworld. He finds Salvador injured at Nicola's apartment and cuts off the meerkat's head and attaches it to a plate and renames him John the Baptist.

After, with the help of Dr. Fergusen, he finds a partially mutilated Nicola in an organ bank under a pile of miscellaneous body parts guarded by a naked troll. He carries Nicola through the tunnels back to his childhood home and finds a creation of Quin named Candle. Candle leads Nick to the Psyche witch named Rafter. After Rafter decides to try to salvage Nicola, Shadrach takes the action of venturing deeper into the underworld to kill Quin. He finds Nick, now transformed into a piece of living art, being attacked by some in the garbage re-cycling facility. Nick takes Shadrach lower and tells him how to get to Quin by jumping off a moving train with a parachute. Nick pushes Shadrach out of the train only to be shot by Shadrach as he falls.

Shadrach manages to open his chute yet he hits the ground hard. Later, he wakes by a beach and an ocean and kicks over a skull where he finds another creation of Quin's called the Gollux. The Gollux tells him the truth while John the Baptist lies, the Gollux leads Shadrach to a ray-like creature named the saylber which Shadrach rides across the ocean and into Quin's world which is actually a very large minnow named the leviathan.

He kills Quin and the remote and the whole place explodes. Shadrach climbs up the cliffs back to the subway level. Shadrach retrieves Nicola and takes her to the surface where they are both on a bridge staring at the city which is called Veniss.

== Critical notes ==
William Thompson of SF Site wrote "the author displays his usual bold and imaginative skill, creating a narrative world lush yet spare in detail. It is in description, in imagery, this lean novel most often excels, in VanderMeer's deft ability to capture through brief illustrative portraits what others would require pages to express. Informed by vision, rather than character-driven, his protagonists, by comparison, are more support than lead, acting out their allotted roles, significant most for what they represent than their singular portrayal and needs, or the human sympathy extended each. There is a knit cohesion close in service to the novel's overall themes, an unfolding symbolism and allegory that is ultimately let loose during the final chapters, unleashing a Babel of imagery recalling the febrile panels of The Garden of Earthly Delights. And the themes of the narrative, dramatically yet cleverly revealed, could not be more earnest or timely. Already recognized as one of fantasy's more creative talents, Veniss Underground will only further Jeff VanderMeer's growing reputation for innovative and imaginative fiction."

Michael Moorcock of The Guardian noted "This is a short, rich book which another writer might easily extend to a bulky trilogy. It makes a welcome change from the huge tomes that still form a wall between the curious reader and the best of our contemporary visionaries, who could well be creating one of the dominant literary forms of the 21st century."
