= The Night Side =

1947 anthology edited by August Derleth

- Dust-jacket from the first edition
- Editor: August Derleth
- Illustrator: Lee Brown Coye
- Language: English
- Genre: Fantasy, horror
- Publisher: Rinehart & Company
- Publication date: 1947
- Publication place: United States
- Media type: Print (hardback)
- Pages: viii, 372

The Night Side is an anthology of fantasy and horror stories edited by American writer August Derleth and illustrated by Lee Brown Coye. It was first published by Rinehart & Company in 1947. The stories had originally appeared in the magazines Amazing Stories, Collier's Weekly, Weird Tales, Saturday Review, The London Mercury, Unknown, Astounding Stories, Esquire, The Briarcliff Quarterly, Cosmopolitan, Blue Book, Top-Notch and Fantastic Adventures or in the collections The Clock Strikes Twelve, The Children of the Pool, Fearful Pleasures, Nights of the Round Table and My Grimmest Nightmare.

== Contents ==
- Foreword, by August Derleth
- "The Colour Out of Space", by H. P. Lovecraft
- "The First Sheaf", by H. Russell Wakefield
- "The Moon-Caller", by MacKinlay Kantor
- "The Extra Passenger", by Stephen Grendon
- "Bethmoora", by Lord Dunsany
- "The Smoking Leg", by John Metcalfe
- "The Exalted Omega", by Arthur Machen
- "Joshua", by R. Creighton-Buck
- "Enoch", by Robert Bloch
- "Cheese", by A. E. Coppard
- "Mr. Minchin’s Midsummer", by Margery Lawrence
- "Mimsy Were the Borogoves", by Lewis Padgett
- "The Eerie Mr. Murphy", by Howard E. Wandrei
- "The Smiling People", by Ray Bradbury
- "The Face in the Mirror", by Denys Val Baker
- "Professor Pfaff’s Last Recital", by Alan Nelson
- "Seaton’s Aunt", by Walter de la Mare
- "The Mask of Medusa", by Nelson S. Bond
- "One Head Well Done", by John D. Swain
- "Sammy Calls a Noobus", by Henry A. Norton
- "The Night Wire", by H. F. Arnold
- "The Three Marked Pennies", by Mary Elizabeth Counselman
- "Nightmare", by Marjorie Bowen
