= The Strange Bird: A Borne Story =

2018 short story by Jeff VanderMeer

The Strange Bird: A Borne Story is a short story written by Jeff VanderMeer and published in 2018. Its genre has been described as being post-apocalyptic, new weird, and climate change fiction. Its main character is a bird-like creature made of biotechnology with some human consciousness inside of her, and it has been thematically interpreted as an analysis of people's relationship with the environment and with animals.

== Plot summary ==
The Strange Bird: A Borne Story follows the life of the main character, only referred to as the Strange Bird. She is a biologically engineered bird-like creature who contains an unspecified amount of human genetics. The story begins after her escape from the laboratory where she was created alongside other strange animals. She begins her journey by flying around a post-apocalyptic desert landscape, looking to find other birds.

She is captured by a person described as an old man who keeps her hostage in an abandoned prison, keeping her as his pet, and calling her by the name Isadora. The man threatens to kill her when she attempts to speak English to him. Eventually, the bird manipulates her engineered feathers to blend into the background and become invisible in an attempt to trick the old man into opening the cage and escape.

The man sees through her plot to escape and brings her into an abandoned city where he is then killed by Charlie X. The Strange Bird breaks her wing in another effort to escape, which leaves her vulnerable to recapture. Charlie X captures her and delivers her to a character known as The Magician, who also appears in VanderMeer's larger work Borne. The Magician dismembers the Strange Bird and uses her feathers to build herself an invisibility cloak. It is later explained that these feathers still contain the Strange Bird's consciousness.

After many years of torture from The Magician, two other characters from Borne, Rachel and Wick, rescue the bird from the cloak. In the end, after being freed, the Strange Bird follows the programming Sanji gave her - what she describes as a "compass" or a "beacon" inside her. She ends up returning to the laboratory from which she originated, where she happily reunites with another Strange Bird.

Throughout the narrative, backstory is provided. The Strange Bird describes memories of the laboratory, including one night when the scientists play a game of chess and force their confused animals to be the chess pieces. She also has multiple dreams of talking with the scientist who created her, Sanji, on an island.

== Characters ==
The Strange Bird: A creature made from biotechnology, and the protagonist of the story.

Sanji: A worker at the laboratory and the creator of the Strange Bird.

The Magician: A mad scientist who transforms the bird's biotechnology into an invisibility cloak.

Rachel and Wick: They work against the Magician, and rescue the Strange Bird at the end.

The Old Man: The captor of the bird.

Charlie X: A man described as bat-faced. He does the bidding of the Magician.

Mord: A flying bear.

== Post-apocalyptic setting ==
The Strange Bird: A Borne Story is set in the exact same setting as VanderMeer's longer work Borne; and many of the same characters appear including Rachel, Wick, and the Magician, but there are no new plot developments, instead the characters are seen in a new perspective. The characters also inhabit some of the same places, especially the long abandoned, and crumbling city where the majority of the plot takes place.

The setting is post-apocalyptic, however, the catastrophe which caused the bleak landscape remains unspecified. Although the author never mentions climate change in the story, other's analysis of it suggests it's post apocalyptic setting could be a reference to the current climate crisis.

In addition to incorporating the climate change fiction genre and the traditional post-apocalyptic genre, VanderMeer mixes others including science fiction, body horror, and weird literature to create something unique.

== Thematic interpretations ==
Louise Economides, and Laura Shackelford categorize the genre of work as soft science fiction because it incorporates fields of soft sciences such as psychology and ecology, as it theorizes about the future of the environment, and our individual relationships with the environment. VanderMeer's work is referred to as eco-psychological because the technology in the novella is not scientifically accurate or realistic, but functions as a metaphor for psychological processes. The novella questions how humans develop their identities in relation to the external environment, and the mechanisms in society that cause the individual to disregard environmental concerns. Economides, and Shackelford argue that forming a personal identity with the environment is a prerequisite to any potential green politics. They state that work also has relation to ecofeminist and queer theories, but mostly focuses on the study of eco-psychoanalysis. The ways in which we differentiate species i.e. how we think of differences between humans and animals can only be understood in a context of ecological violence, and this novella gives an anecdotal example of new ways of thinking about kinship with nature.

The story has also been interpreted to be a piece about animal psychology in the Anthropocene. The Strange Bird's creation, imprisonment, and other traumatic experiences occur as the human characters exploit her for their own gain. This relates to real world animals suffering from anthropogenic climate change and other ways humans harm the environment. VanderMeer has said himself in an interview about the book that he is concerned about ethical issues surrounding the treatment of animals as products and not as living beings, and this inspired him to write the story.

Other political messages in the book include challenging the arguments of climate change deniers, by describing a setting that outlines the consequences of that world view, in which humans are no longer the dominant species on Earth, and non-human animals rule.

VanderMeer included many symbols, metaphors, metonyms and other literary devices to relate to these themes. One example is that VanderMeer writes in an anthropomorphic way as he imagines the emotions, stories, and lives of the hybrid animals he writes about. He treats animals in the narrative as if they were more similar to human beings than different, speculating on the nature of human understanding and compassion. In addition to anthropomorphism, VanderMeer uses many symbols to draw the reader into the narrative. In the laboratory, the animals were used as chess pieces for the scientist's entertainment. In this book, the game of chess symbolizes all of the abuse and manipulation the strange animals suffered at the hands of humans.

In addition, the act of flying symbolizes freedom. Whenever the bird's ability to fly is taken away when she was imprisoned, had broken her wing, and was transformed by The Magician it symbolizes a loss of freedom. Places where the bird feels trapped include the lab, the prison, the city, and even in herself as the internal compass pulls her to an unknown destination. These link clearly to themes regarding the captivity and imprisonment of animals.

Many things are purposefully left unclear and vague especially regarding the main character's emotions. The Strange Bird and the readers alike are left in the dark for the majority of the novella regarding the purpose the bird created for, the meaning of this internal compass, and the location it is guiding her to. The bird herself has questions and confusions about the human world such as human language. According to analysis by Marco Caracciolo, the confusion inside the animal's mind functions as a metonymy for both the unpredictability of the climate crisis, and the uncertainty we as people feel towards global warming.
