= Authority (novel) =

2014 novel by Jeff VanderMeer

- Author: Jeff VanderMeer
- Language: English
- Series: Southern Reach Series
- Genre: Fantasy, Horror, Science fiction
- Publisher: Farrar, Straus and Giroux
- Publication date: May 6, 2014
- Publication place: United States
- Media type: Print
- Pages: 352
- ISBN: 978-0-374-10410-8
- Preceded by: Annihilation
- Followed by: Acceptance

Authority is a 2014 novel by Jeff VanderMeer. It is the second in a series of four books called the Southern Reach Series. In an interview, VanderMeer stated that, "if Annihilation is an expedition into Area X, then Authority is an expedition into the Southern Reach, the agency sending in the expeditions." It was released in May 2014.

Authority revolves around the operatives of the Southern Reach agency. The agency is responsible for the investigation into the unexplained phenomena of Area X. The second book takes place in the human inhabited areas (unlike the first book, Annihilation, which was set within Area X).

== Plot summary ==
The Southern Reach is a government agency formed to manage a coastal region named Area X. The public is led to believe that the region suffered an environmental disaster and is isolated for safety; in truth, the region has been taken over by an unknown force changing the environment and ecosystem behind a largely impenetrable "border". John "Control" Rodriguez takes over as the new director of the Southern Reach. His mother and grandfather are also prominent and influential government agents. Control reports to a mysterious handler called "The Voice" at Central over phone calls and e-mail.

In his role as director, Control frequently encounters friction with the existing staff to various degrees: in particular, the assistant director Grace Stevenson, who seems to have an emotional attachment to his predecessor. Control methodically sifts through the accumulated data (interviews, photos, videos) and discovers that there have been many more expeditions into Area X than have been disclosed to the expedition members, using a combination number-lettering system to obfuscate the true number of expeditions. The all-male eleventh expedition alone had multiple iterations with slightly different control factors similar to a lab experiment, leading to the formation of an all-female twelfth expedition to see how this composition would interact with Area X (with this expedition's biologist being the protagonist of the previous novel). The expedition's psychologist was, in fact, the previous director of the Southern Reach (whom he replaced), a fact that she did not reveal to the other members of the expedition.

The biologist, anthropologist, and surveyor mysteriously reappear in personally significant locations and are detained by the Southern Reach for debriefing. Grace sends the anthropologist and surveyor back to Central as a way of undermining Control, who begins interrogating the biologist. Slowly, he begins to empathize with her and understand her interest in the area's ecosystem. However, she is uncooperative, requesting that Control refers to her as Ghost Bird, insisting that she is not the biologist, and speaks of a "brightness" inside of her. After initially failing to gain any information about Area X or what happened there, his tactics become increasingly more unconventional.

Control suspects that he is under hypnosis and (correctly) surmises that his handler, "The Voice", is hypnotizing him to steer his investigation. He is able to throw off the effects of hypnosis and work more independently, but this alienates him from Central, and he relies on his mother to protect him from retaliation. Central forcibly removes Ghost Bird from the Southern Reach, as they believe Control has developed an emotional attachment to her.

Control visits the previous director's house and makes discoveries that hint at her more personal connection to Area X. After returning to Southern Reach headquarters, he has an unsettling interaction when, in a hidden room, he discovers one of his scientists, who seems to have lost his mind, creating a collection of nightmarish paintings of Southern Reach personnel. Later, he tries to go to the science division to dismiss the scientist, but finds his path blocked by a wall that should not exist that appears to be breathing. As he runs upstairs in terror, he sees that the border of Area X is moving, encroaching on the facility and leading with it a monstrous version of the previous director. Control is the only member of Southern Reach who reacts to this development with alarm, and he abandons the facility as Area X envelops it. Returning home to pack, he encounters his mother and learns more about what has been happening. The anthropologist and surveyor both left behind a kind of "contamination" at the sites they were originally found at which broke through quarantine. Control also realizes the previous director was the little girl in a photo found at the lighthouse in Area X. This completely alters his outlook, as it is now clear that she is somehow profoundly interlinked with the anomaly.

Control also learns that Ghost Bird has escaped Central. Based on his intuition and knowledge of the biologist's background, Control travels to the site of an old field study she had conducted before she came to the Southern Reach, with Central close behind despite his efforts to dodge their agents. Control finally meets Ghost Bird at a remote location where she has unexpectedly created another portal to Area X at the bottom of a pool of water, a gateway that she believes has formed from the brightness she carried that has run its course through her. With dozens of Central agents approaching, she jumps into the pool, and Control, hearing a voice in his head urging him to follow her, also jumps.

== Reception ==
Authority made the best sellers list for trade fiction paperback for the May 25, 2014 edition of The New York Times. Entertainment Weekly gave Authority a B+, saying that the story in Authority "elevates the series beyond bio-thriller to something truly compelling." The New York Times also gave Authority favorable review:

As in the first book, VanderMeer also performs a careful character study of one of the few people strange enough to contend (debatably) with Area X. This elevates the whole exercise into something more than just a horror novel; there’s something Poe-like in this tightening, increasingly paranoid focus. But where Poe kept his most vicious blows relatively oblique, VanderMeer drives them deep — albeit in a corkscrewing way that is no less cruel and exquisite. There’s a slower buildup of tension in this book than the first, possibly because it’s almost twice as long. The payoff is absolutely worth the patience.
