= City of Saints and Madmen =

2001 book by Jeff VanderMeer

- Cover of the 2001 Cosmos Books edition
- Author: Jeff VanderMeer
- Language: English
- Genre: Fantasy
- Published: 2001
- Publisher: Cosmos Books
- Publication place: United States
- Media type: Print
- ISBN: 978-0553383577
- OCLC: 704515503

City of Saints and Madmen: The Book of Ambergris is a collection of fantasy short stories by American writer Jeff VanderMeer, set in the fictional metropolis of Ambergris. The setting was further explored in the novels Shriek: An Afterword (2006) and Finch (2009).

== Setting ==
The stories of City of Saints and Madmen are set in Ambergris, an urban sprawl named for "the most secret and valued part of the whale" and populated by humans after its original inhabitants—a race of mushroom-like humanoids known as "gray caps"—were violently driven underground. These creatures, though removed from the eccentricities of daily life in Ambergris, continue to cast a shadow over the city with their unexplained nocturnal activities.

== History ==
Ambergris began in 1992 with "Learning to Leave the Flesh", a short story conceived for the Clarion writers' workshop at Michigan State University. Although it does not reference the city directly, it mentions locations that would reappear in later work, such as Albumuth Boulevard and the River Moth. Considered a "proto-Ambergris story" by the author, "Learning to Leave the Flesh" wouldn't be included in the book until its 2004 edition.

== Editions ==
=== First edition ===
City of Saints and Madmen: The Book of Ambergris was first published in trade paperback format by Cosmos Books (an imprint of Wildside Press) in 2001. It contained four novella-length pieces:

- "Dradin, In Love"
- "An Early History of Ambergris"
- "The Transformation of Martin Lake"
- "The Strange Case of X"

=== Second edition ===
Dust jacket for the Prime Books edition, with art by Scott Eagle as well as a story

The following year, a deluxe edition of City of Saints and Madmen appeared in hardcover format from Prime Books. All four novellas from the first edition were revised, and new material was added as an appendix to the book:

- An untitled vignette, printed on the dust jacket. The story contains the book's title and author's name, which appear highlighted near the bottom of the front panel.
- "A Letter from Dr. V to Dr. Simpkin"
- "X's Notes"
- "The Release of Belacqua"
- "King Squid"
- "The Hoegbotton Family History"
- "The Cage"
- "In the Hours After Death"
- "A Note from Dr. V to Dr. Simpkin"
- "The Man Who Had No Eyes" (encrypted)
- "The Ambergris Glossary"

=== Third edition ===
When the collection was published in the United Kingdom by Tor Books in 2004, two extra stories were offered:

- "The Exchange"
- "Learning to Leave the Flesh"

The remaining material is unchanged, although "The Man Who Had No Eyes" had to be decrypted for the mass market paperback edition since the original cipher was made unusable by the change of format and the publisher decided not to re-encode the story.

=== Omnibus edition ===
In 2020, a collected hardcover edition of the Ambergris Trilogy was published. While City of Saints and Madmen includes the original four novellas, as well as "The Cage", it omits the rest of the additional stories due to the volume's pagecount.

== Awards ==
- 2007 Tähtifantasia Award for the best foreign fantasy book released in Finland in 2006.

== Theatre ==
In 2013, Irish theatre company Tribe adapted parts of the collection for the stage. Relying on Dradin, in Love for the main narrative, they drew also on elements of King Squid, The Exchange, and the dust jacket's untitled vignette. Reception was positive, with Irish Theatre Magazine describing the piece as "athletic and enterprising... astutely adapted and directed... an imaginatively realised piece of work," and Cork's Evening Echo saying that it possessed "a visual verve that is quite a rarity on the Irish stage." The piece was adapted and directed by Bob Kelly, an Irish graduate of L'École Internationale de Théâtre Jacques Lecoq.
