= Shriek: An Afterword =

2006 novel by Jeff VanderMeer

- Hardcover edition (U.S.)
- Author: Jeff VanderMeer
- Language: English
- Series: Ambergris
- Genre: Fantasy
- Published: 2006
- Publisher: Tor Books
- Publication place: United States
- Media type: Print, e-book
- Pages: 352
- ISBN: 978-0765314666

Shriek: An Afterword is a fantasy novel by American writer Jeff VanderMeer. Published in 2006, Shriek is set in the fictional city of Ambergris, a recurring setting in VanderMeer's work. The novel was written over a period of eight years, owing in part to what the author said, "[some scenes that are] very personal."

== Plot introduction ==
Ambergris, named for "the most secret and valued part of the whale", is a fantastical urban milieu, explicitly modern and apparently pre-industrial (despite the presence of guns, bombs, and motor vehicles). Ambergris is characterized by grocery stores, post offices, cafés, and vendors (The "Borges Bookstore" bears note). The city was built over the land (and quiet protests) of the fungally-adept "graycaps", humanoids of uncertain disposition. The inhabitants of Ambergris enjoy a fascination with squid, and celebrate an anarchic annual Festival of the Freshwater Squid.

== Characters ==
Shriek: An Afterword deals principally with two eponymous siblings, Janice and Duncan Shriek. Janice, an ex-society figure and art critic, narrates with great and sometimes dark flamboyance. Duncan, a historian of note, entertains twin obsessions: rival historian Mary Sabon and the mysterious graycaps. The Shrieks figure rather prominently in VanderMeer's collection of Ambergris novellas and short stories City of Saints and Madmen: Duncan narrates the novella "The Early History of Ambergris", while Janice's art criticism figures into the World Fantasy Award-winning novella "The Transformation of Martin Lake".

== Critical notes ==
Reviewer of The Believer noted "It's not clear what obsesses Jeff VanderMeer more, mushrooms or books. Both appear on almost every page of his new novel Shriek: An Afterword, in which disgraced historian Duncan Shriek seeks to uncover the mystery of a race of mushroom people with mysterious fungal plans, who lurk below the surface of the moss-covered city of Ambergris. VanderMeer's previous novels are part of a fantasy subgenre, often categorized as the New Weird. While Shriek certainly contains fantasy elements, it doesn’t fit into any strictly delineated genre. There are more ideas here than flights of fancy; VanderMeer owes more to Borges than Tolkien."
