= The Troika =

1997 novel by Stepan Chapman

- Paperback cover
- Author: Stepan Chapman
- Language: English
- Genre: Science fiction
- Publisher: Ministry of Whimsy Press
- Publication date: 1997
- Publication place: United States
- Media type: Print (hardback & paperback)
- Pages: 256 (paperback edition)

The Troika is a 1997 science fiction novel by American writer Stepan Chapman. Written in surrealist style, the novel features a highly complex plot mixing fantasy and science fiction. It received the Philip K. Dick Award for 1997.

== Plot summary ==
The novel introduces three beings – a jeep, a dinosaur, and an old Mexican woman – travelling across a desert under the glare of three suns. They have been travelling for centuries though they do not know why they are crossing the desert or if they will ever reach the other side. The characters have each changed bodies several times. Their travels are interspersed with dream-sequence-like flashbacks describing various transformed versions of the 20th Century.

== Major characters ==
- Alex – an automated jeep, who began as a man then became cyborg.
- Eva – an old Mexican woman, formerly a fish-priestess and later a whore.
- Naomi – a brontosaur who was once a military corpsicle. A daughter of Alex and Eva's.
