= Forrest Aguirre =

American author

Forrest Aguirre (born July 29, 1969) is an American fantasy and horror author, and winner of the 2003 World Fantasy Award for his editing work on Leviathan 3, for which he was also a Philip K. Dick Award nominee. He previously edited the anthology Text:UR – The New Book of Masks. His own fiction has been published in a number of genre periodicals and in the collection Fugue XXIX. In February 2025, his collection Manes Scriptorum will be released by Underland Press. His first novel Swans Over the Moon was published by Wheatland Press, while his second novel, Heraclix and Pomp was published by Underland Press. He often writes about Africa, and is deeply interested in the continent.
