= Annihilation (VanderMeer novel) =

2014 novel by Jeff VanderMeer

- Author: Jeff VanderMeer
- Language: English
- Series: Southern Reach Series
- Genre: Science fiction; horror; weird fiction; Cosmic horror
- Publisher: Farrar, Straus and Giroux
- Publication date: February 2014
- Publication place: United States
- Media type: Print
- Pages: 208
- ISBN: 978-0-374-10409-2
- Followed by: Authority

Annihilation is a 2014 novel by Jeff VanderMeer and is the first book of the Southern Reach Series. The novel follows a team of four women who are sent into a government-managed, uninhabited location called Area X to study and survey the land and ecosystem. They are the twelfth expedition, with previous expeditions having fallen apart due to disappearances, suicides, aggressive cancers, and mental trauma.

Annihilation won the 2014 Nebula Award for Best Novel and the 2014 Shirley Jackson Award for Best Novel. A film loosely based on the novel was released by Paramount Pictures in 2018.

== Background ==
VanderMeer's inspiration for Annihilation and the Southern Reach Series came from a 14-mile (23 km) hike through St. Marks National Wildlife Refuge in Florida. The 2010 Deepwater Horizon disaster was also an inspiration; as oil gushed into the Gulf of Mexico, he imagined Area X, a supernatural zone that removed human pollution from itself. Many of the animals and vegetation VanderMeer saw on this hike are featured in the novel, as well as other locations in the Big Bend area. VanderMeer also consulted wildlife scientists to make details of the novels feel more real.

In March 2014, VanderMeer visited the St. Marks Lighthouse that inspired one of the settings in Annihilation for an interview about the book.

== Plot summary ==
Four armed, unnamed women—a biologist, an anthropologist, a psychologist (the team's leader), and a military-trained surveyor—cross the border into Area X, an unspecified coastal location that has been closed to the public for three decades. They believe that they are the twelfth expedition into Area X. The story is told through the field journal of the biologist, who gradually reveals that her husband was part of the previous expedition, from which he suddenly returned without the memory or ability to explain his reappearance. The other members of his expedition appeared the same way, and all died of cancer a few months later.

In Area X, the four women find an unmapped bunker with a staircase curving deep into the ground, which the biologist feels oddly inclined to call "the Tower". The psychologist insists on referring to it as "the tunnel". Inside, they discover cursive writing of a strange, elevated speech that begins "Where lies the strangling fruit that came from the hand of the sinner I shall bring forth the seeds of the dead..." and extends down the Tower's wall in a seemingly endless sentence. The biologist is amazed to see that the words are written in a fungal material, which she examines closely, accidentally inhaling some spores. One of the psychologist's responsibilities is to trigger hypnosis in the other women at regular intervals, calming them and grounding them amidst the possibility of hallucination. The biologist returns to the surface and remains fully conscious for one such hypnotism, and becomes unsettled seeing that the psychologist is also dictating instructions on how to perceive Area X. She realizes that she must have become immune to the hypnotic conditioning—possibly an effect of the spores. The team encounters multiple fauna which display fleeting moments of what the biologist fears to hypothesize could be sapience. She remains silent about her realizations and continues with the team. At night the group hears an unknown creature's persistent, ominous moaning in the distance.

The biologist avoids the psychologist's suspicion by feigning obedience to her hypnotic suggestions. The party finds the anthropologist missing at dawn, having abandoned the mission according to the psychologist. The three others return to the Tower, and the psychologist guards the entrance while the surveyor and biologist descend. The biologist feels something like a heartbeat in the walls which she feels to be somehow "breathing", but the surveyor sees none of it due to the prior hypnosis. They find the mutilated corpse of the anthropologist, whom they deduce was killed by the unknown entity responsible for the writing on the wall (which the biologist privately names "the Crawler"). The surveyor and biologist realize that this means the psychologist lied to them. They take a vial from the anthropologist's body containing a sample from the Crawler, which turns out to paradoxically be composed of human brain matter. Returning to the surface, they find that the psychologist has disappeared. The biologist is conscious of a "brightness" growing within herself, which she attributes to the spores. She leaves to explore a distant lighthouse, while the surveyor stays behind to protect their campsite.

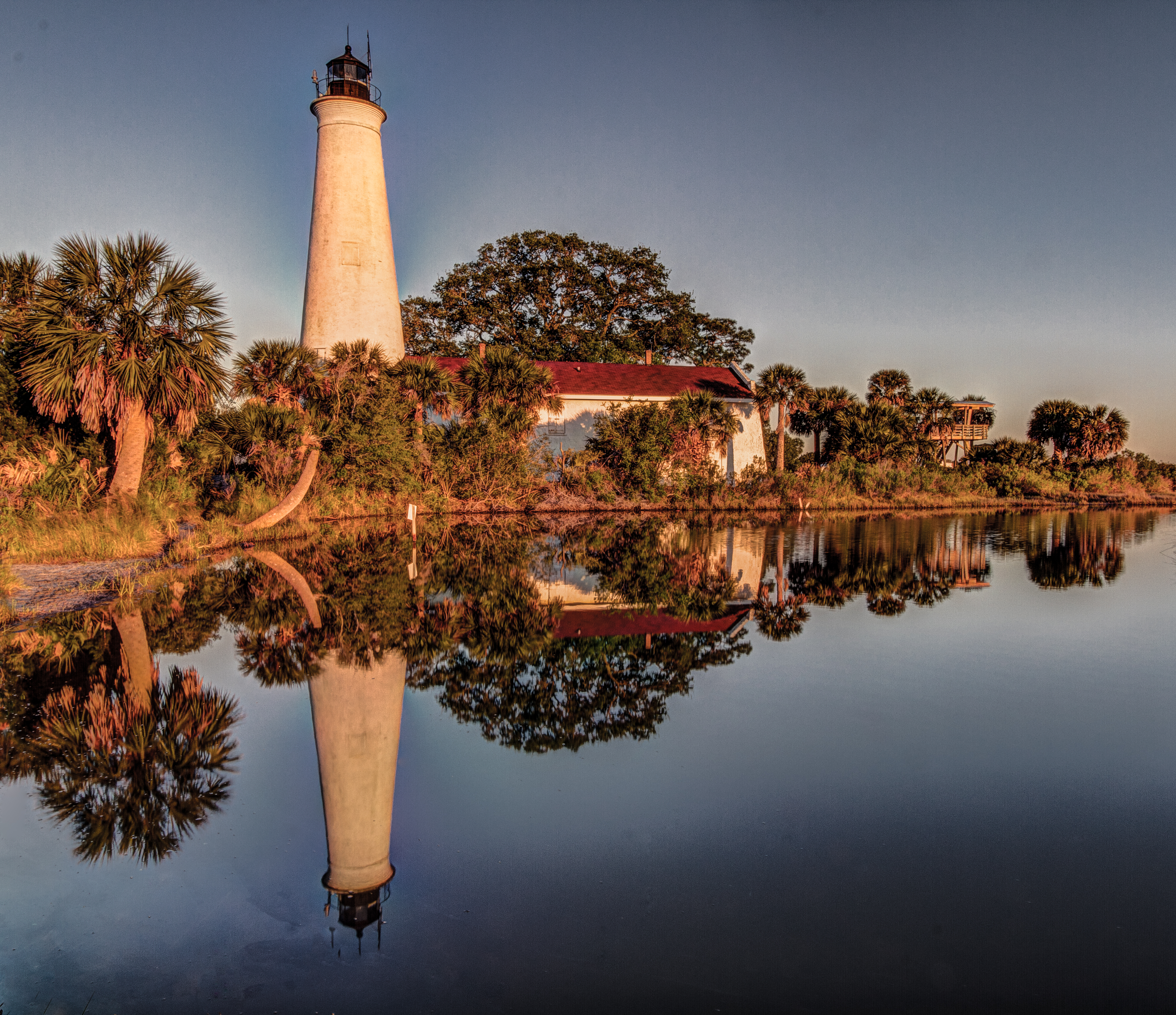
St. Marks Light, VanderMeer's inspiration for the lighthouse in the book

Inside the lighthouse, the biologist discovers copious bloodstains and a hidden pile of hundreds of past expeditions' journals, some detailing battles against a monstrous presence from the sea. She pockets an old photograph of a lighthouse keeper and the journal of her late husband. The biologist suddenly finds the psychologist dying at the lighthouse's base. The psychologist perceives the biologist as a glowing "flame", and believes the two have already fought, resulting in her jumping from the top. The psychologist remains frustratingly reticent when questioned, but reveals that Area X's border is slowly expanding before dying. The biologist discovers that some of the psychologist's body has been severely infected by seemingly some kind of fungus, perhaps explaining her apparent hallucinations, and takes samples of her normal and transformed flesh.

Traveling back to base camp, the biologist senses the moaning creature approaching. She narrowly escapes the creature but is shot twice by the surveyor who, like the psychologist, fears her "glow". Unable to convince the surveyor she is not a threat, the biologist shoots the surveyor back, killing her using enhanced instincts that have resulted from her "brightening." Miraculously, the biologist's own gunshot wounds begin to heal.

The biologist analyzes her plant and animal samples under a microscope. She finds the sample of the "fungus" identical to the control sample of the psychologist's flesh, and furthermore that two apparent flora and fauna samples are composed of human cells as well. She also reads her husband's journal, which explains that he and a teammate found themselves mysteriously unable to reach the coastal border of Area X, as well as how they returned to the lighthouse to find the rest of their expedition slaughtered. They also witnessed doppelgängers of the whole team (including themselves) walking to the Tower, which caused them to abort the mission. Her husband resolves to travel even deeper in, and the journal ends. From her collected evidence and experiences, the biologist theorizes that humans who enter Area X are gradually transformed into other things, and that maybe something from Area X is transforming into humans in turn.

The biologist returns to the Tower to confront the Crawler directly. She meets it on the staircase and finds it almost impossible to see or describe, rapidly shifting appearance in blinding lights and shattering noises. She tries to run but it paralyzes her in an agonizing loop of losing and regaining consciousness, somehow entering and comprehending her in totality, which she understands instinctively but not logically. It tosses her down the stairs, and she quickly presses further on to escape it. As she moves she senses a fuzzy white door somewhere deep below her. After over an hour of descending towards it, she concludes it is too far down and she does not have the strength to make the journey. She backtracks up the stairs, where she is amazed to find the Crawler allows her to pass without regard. Looking back at it one final time, the biologist catches a glimpse of a human face and finally recognizes the Crawler as the lighthouse keeper from the photograph, transformed extensively by countless years in Area X. She escapes the Tower and resolves to remain inside Area X and follow the coastline to see where it ends, as her husband once attempted.

== Reception ==
The reviews for Annihilation have been generally positive.

Jason Sheehan of National Public Radio described the book as page-turning and suspenseful, saying, "about three hours later, I looked up again with half the book behind me and wondered how I'd gotten from there to here." Salon.com named it book of the week, while GQ Magazine recognized it as one of the top books for the month of February and said that it was "a book about an intelligent, deadly fungus [which] makes for an enthralling read." The Washington Post said that it was "successfully creepy, an old-style gothic horror novel set in a not-too-distant future" while The Daily Telegraph said that it "shows signs of being the novel that will allow VanderMeer to break through to a new and larger audience". Entertainment Weekly gave Annihilation a B+ rating. The novel won the 2014 Nebula Award for Best Novel and the 2014 Shirley Jackson Award for Best Novel.

== Film adaptation ==
In 2014, Paramount Pictures acquired rights to the novel, with writer-director Alex Garland set to adapt the script and direct the film. In May 2015, Natalie Portman entered into talks to star in the film. In November 2015, Jane the Virgin star Gina Rodriguez was in talks to co-star in the film with Portman. In March 2016, it was announced that Oscar Isaac would join the cast of the film.

Garland stated to Creative Screenwriting that his adaptation is based solely on the first novel of the original trilogy, as it was the only one released at the time. Filming occurred throughout late April 2016 in the South Forest area of Windsor Great Park in England. The film was released on February 23, 2018, receiving positive reviews and grossing $43.1 million.
