= Ann VanderMeer =

American publisher

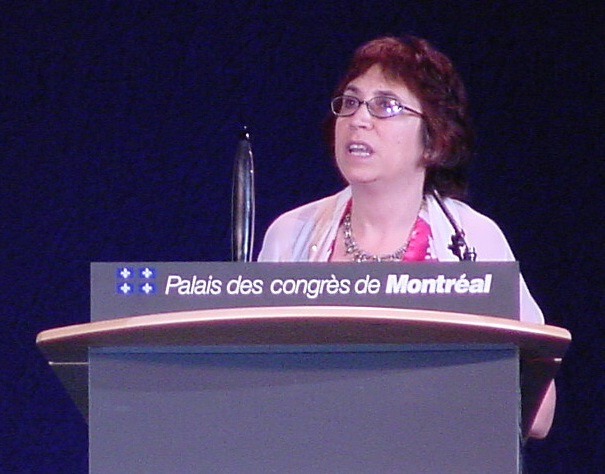
- Ann VanderMeer accepting the Hugo Award (August 2009)
- Born: United States
- Occupations: Editor, publisher
- Spouse: Jeff VanderMeer
- Children: 2

Ann VanderMeer (née Kennedy) is an American publisher and editor, and the second female editor of the horror magazine Weird Tales. She is the founder of Buzzcity Press.

Work from her press and related periodicals has won the British Fantasy Award, the International Rhysling Award, and appeared in several year's best anthologies. VanderMeer was also the founder of The Silver Web magazine, a periodical devoted to experimental and avant-garde fantasy literature. In addition to her magazine work, she has edited several notable collections, including the Locus Award-winning The Weird and the 2008 genre-defining anthology The New Weird, published by Tachyon.

In 2009 Weird Tales, edited by VanderMeer and Stephen H. Segal, won a Hugo Award for Best Semiprozine. Though some of its individual contributors have been honored with Hugos, Nebula Awards, and even one Pulitzer Prize, the magazine itself had never before even been nominated for a Hugo. It was also nominated for a World Fantasy Award in 2009.

She has also edited with her husband Jeff VanderMeer such influential and award-winning anthologies as The New Weird, The Weird, and The Big Book of Science Fiction.

== Works edited ==
VanderMeer was the fiction editor for Weird Tales magazine from 2007 until its purchase by Marvin Kaye in 2011, and is a guest editor for the new Best American Fantasy series from Prime Books. She also edited Fast Ships, Black Sails (Nightshade Books), Last Drink Bird Head, and Love-Drunk Book Heads.

VanderMeer has partnered with her husband, author Jeff VanderMeer, on The Kosher Guide to Imaginary Animals. She has also partnered with Jeff on editing projects such as the World Fantasy Award-winning Leviathan series and the Hugo finalist The Thackery T. Lambshead Pocket Guide to Eccentric & Discredited Diseases. Recent collaborations include The New Weird, Steampunk, and Steampunk II: Steampunk Reloaded, published by Tachyon Publications. In the fall of 2011, Ann and Jeff VanderMeer founded Weird Fiction Review, an online magazine dealing in weird fiction. The Time Traveler's Almanac was published in March 2014.

In October 2012, VanderMeer edited a third volume of the Steampunk series, Steampunk III: Steampunk Revolution, also published by Tachyon Publications.

Ann and Jeff VanderMeer live in Tallahassee, Florida.

== Selected works ==
=== Anthologies ===
- The New Weird (with Jeff VanderMeer, 2007)
- Best American Fantasy (with Jeff VanderMeer, 2007)
- Best American Fantasy: v. 2 (with Jeff VanderMeer, 2008)
- Steampunk (with Jeff VanderMeer, 2008)
- Fast Ships, Black Sails (with Jeff VanderMeer, 2009)
- Steampunk II: Steampunk Reloaded (with Jeff VanderMeer, 2010)
- The Thackery T. Lambshead Cabinet of Curiosities (with Jeff VanderMeer, 2011)
- Steampunk III: Steampunk Revolution (2012)
- The Weird (with Jeff VanderMeer, 2012)
- The Time Traveler's Almanac (with Jeff VanderMeer, 2014)
- Sisters of the Revolution: A Feminist Speculative Fiction Anthology (with Jeff VanderMeer, 2015)
- The Big Book of Science Fiction (with Jeff VanderMeer, 2016)
- The Big Book of Classic Fantasy (with Jeff VanderMeer, 2019)
- The Big Book of Modern Fantasy (with Jeff VanderMeer, 2020)
