= Michel Bernanos =

French poet and fantasy writer (1923–1964)

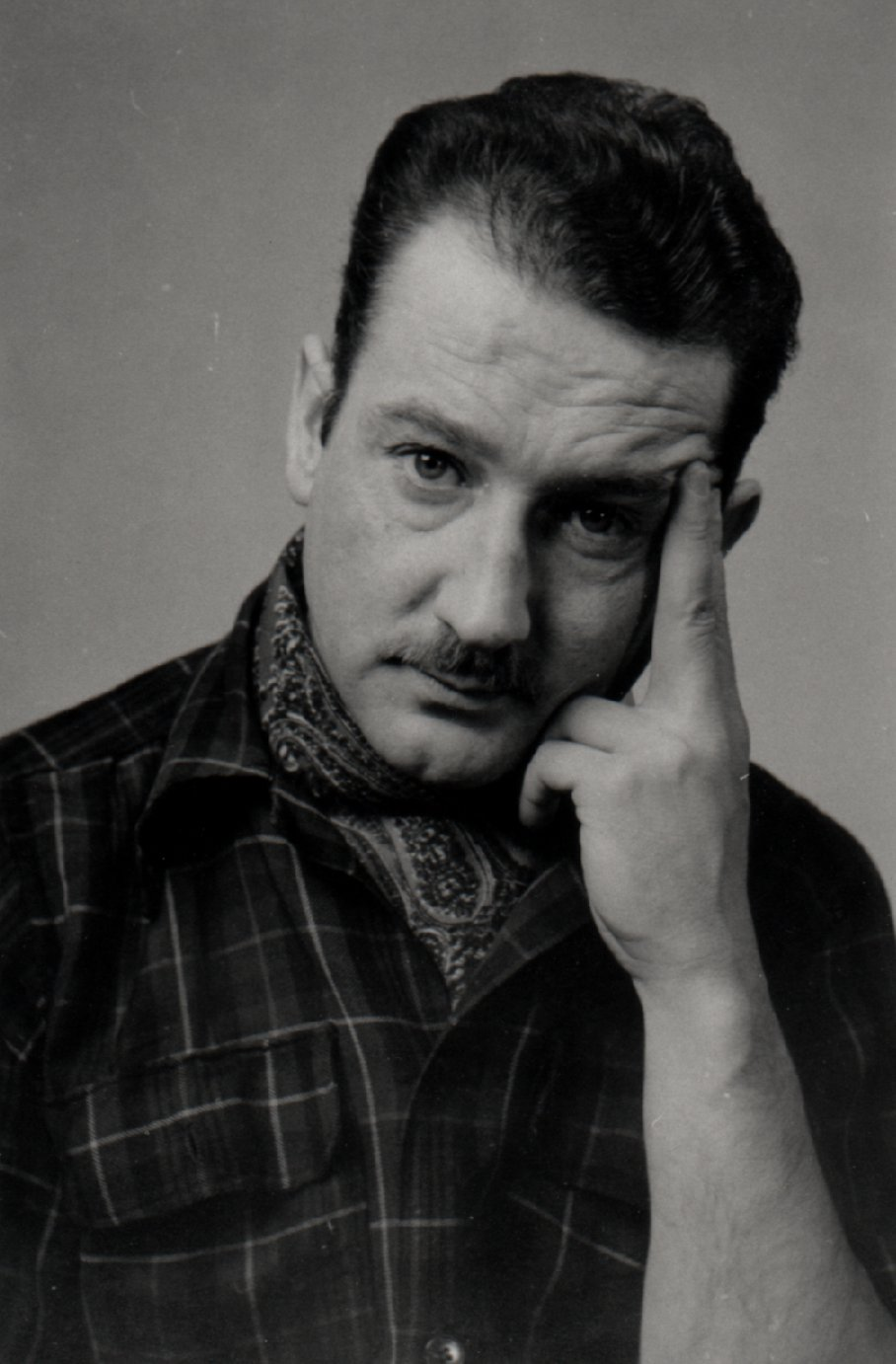

Michel Bernanos (20 January 1923 – 27 July 1964) was a French poet and fantasy writer. He was the fourth child of French writer Georges Bernanos. He also used Michel Talbert and Michel Drowin as pen names to avoid the reputation of his father's name. His great cycle of initiation, inspired by two trips to Brazil between 1938 and 1948, centers around the novel The Other Side of the Mountain (1967).

Bernanos died by suicide in the Forest of Fontainebleau. Most of his works were published posthumously.

== Biography ==
The only biography that appears to be devoted to Michel Bernanos is by Salsa Bertin: Michel Bernanos, the Insurgent (ISBN 2851620932).

In 1956, he made a small appearance in the film A Man Escaped. The film was written and directed by Robert Bresson, who adapted his father's novels Diary of a Country Priest and Mouchette.

Only The Murmur of the Gods was published during the author's lifetime, under the pseudonym Michel Drowin.

== Bibliography ==
- Le cycle de la Montagne morte de la vie (The Other Side of the Mountain; Black River, 1996) which includes:
1. "Le Murmure des Dieux" ("The Whisper of the Gods")
2. "L'Envers de l'éperon" ("The Back of the Spur")
3. "La Montagne morte de la vie" ("The Dead Mountain of Life")
4. "Ils ont déchiré Son image" ("They Have Destroyed His Image")
- La Forêt complice (The Forest Accomplice; Le Castor Astral), which contains three stories
- On lui a fait mal (It Hurt him; Black River, 1996), three novels and six short stories:
1. "Les nuits de Rochemaure"
2. "La Grande Bauche"
3. "La Neige qui tue"
4. "On lui a fait mal"
5. "Le Cri des oiseaux"
6. "La Forêt complice" ("The Colluding Forest")
7. "La Parole donnée" ("The Given Word")
8. "La Prière à l'étoile"
9. "La Tempête"
10. "Le Passage"

== Le cycle de la Montagne morte de la vie ==
Written in 1963 in Gentilly, Val-de-Marne, Court, it is divided into two distinct parts. The first part reads like a novel about the sea. A boy of 18 boards a vessel, where he is first bullied by the other crew members and then taken under the wing of the cook Toine. The boat is then stalled at the equator for months, and a mutiny ensues. The vessel is eventually engulfed by a storm, leaving the protagonist and his friend Toine alone and adrift on the sea. Here begins the second part, which becomes much more fantastic. Both main characters are stranded on a mysterious land under a red sun. The novel was translated into English under the title The Other Side of the Mountain and published by Houghton Mifflin in 1968.
