= Stepan Chapman =

American novelist

Stepan Chapman (May 27, 1951 — January 27, 2014) was an American writer of speculative fiction and fabulation. He is best known for the Philip K. Dick Award winning novel The Troika.

Chapman was born and raised in Chicago and then studied theatre at the University of Michigan. His first published work was a story in Analog Science Fiction and Fact in 1969. As a rule his work is more fable-like in tone and surreal than is common for that magazine. He also had several stories in Damon Knight's Orbit anthologies. From the late 1970s, he was primarily published in small literary magazines. A collection of his stories was published, titled Dossier.

== Bibliography ==
=== Novels ===
- The Troika (The Ministry of Whimsy Press, 1997). Published in a revised ebook edition in 2012.

=== Short story collections ===
- Dossier (Creative Arts Book Company, 2001)

=== Chapbooks ===
- Danger Music (The Ministry of Whimsy Press, 1996)
- Common Ectoids of Arizona (Lockout Press, 2001)
- Life on Earth (Four-Sep Publications, 2003)
