= Dichronauts =

2017 science-fiction novel by Greg Egan

- First edition cover
- Author: Greg Egan
- Publisher: Night Shade Books
- Publication date: 2017
- Media type: Hardcover
- Pages: 294
- ISBN: 9781597808927
- OCLC: 954670201
- LC Class: PR9619.3.E35D53 2017

Dichronauts is a hard science-fiction novel by Australian author Greg Egan. The novel was published by Night Shade Books on 11 July 2017. It describes a universe with two time dimensions, one of which corresponds to the time perception of the characters while the other influences their spatial perception, which precludes rotations in the latter chronological direction. Hence a symbiosis of two life forms is necessary, so that they can even see in all directions. Furthermore, many fundamental laws of physics are altered crucially: Objects can roll uphill or not fall over any more when oriented suitably. There is negative kinetic energy and a fourth state of matter. Planets are no longer spherical, but hyperbolic and therefore have three separate surfaces. Egan describes these details on his website.

== Plot ==
In the world of Dichronauts, there are two types of beings living in symbiosis with each other: Walkers, who can only see to the west (or east when turning around), provide mobility, while Siders, leech-like creatures running through their skulls, provide additional sight to the north and south. Every city is in a permanent state of migration to follow the sun's shifting orbit and the narrow habitable zone it creates. The Walker Seth and his Sider Theo from the city of Baharabad at the river Zirona join an expedition to the edge of the habitable zone to map safe routes ahead. They encounter a river with the city of Thanton nearby, in which the Walkers seemed to have used poison against their Siders. Seth talks with Theo about their symbiosis. Previously, his sister Elena got pregnant pushing her Sider Irina to abandon her, leaving her side-blind and with a hole in her head. Theo calls through Thanton in the language of the Siders not audible for Walkers and suspects the presence of Sleepsiders, pushing him to ask Seth about Sleepwalkers. Both agree to return to the expedition, where a vote decides against the return to Baharabad and for more explorations. Soon after, the expedition reaches a cliff without another side or bottom visible and suspects to have reached the end of the world.

== Background (literature) ==
Dichronauts describes the cosmological inverse situation to Egan's earlier Orthogonal trilogy comprising The Clockwork Rocket (2011), The Eternal Flame (2012), and The Arrows of Time (2013). In the trilogy, the characters perceive a space dimension as time, whereas in the stand-alone novel the characters perceive a time dimension as space. In both only a single metric is changed and the implications worked out.

== Background (mathematics and physics) ==
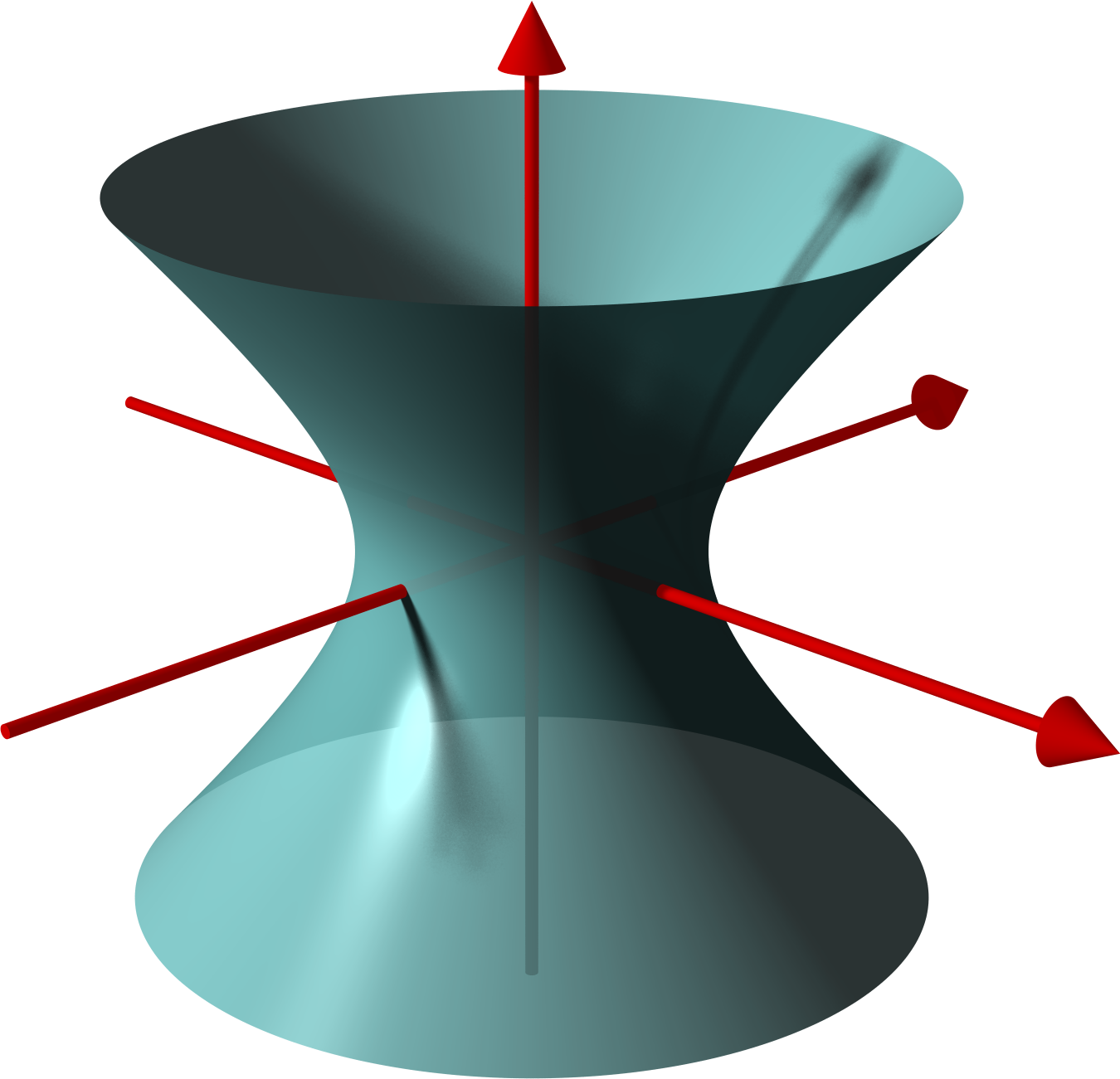
Hyperboloid with one shell

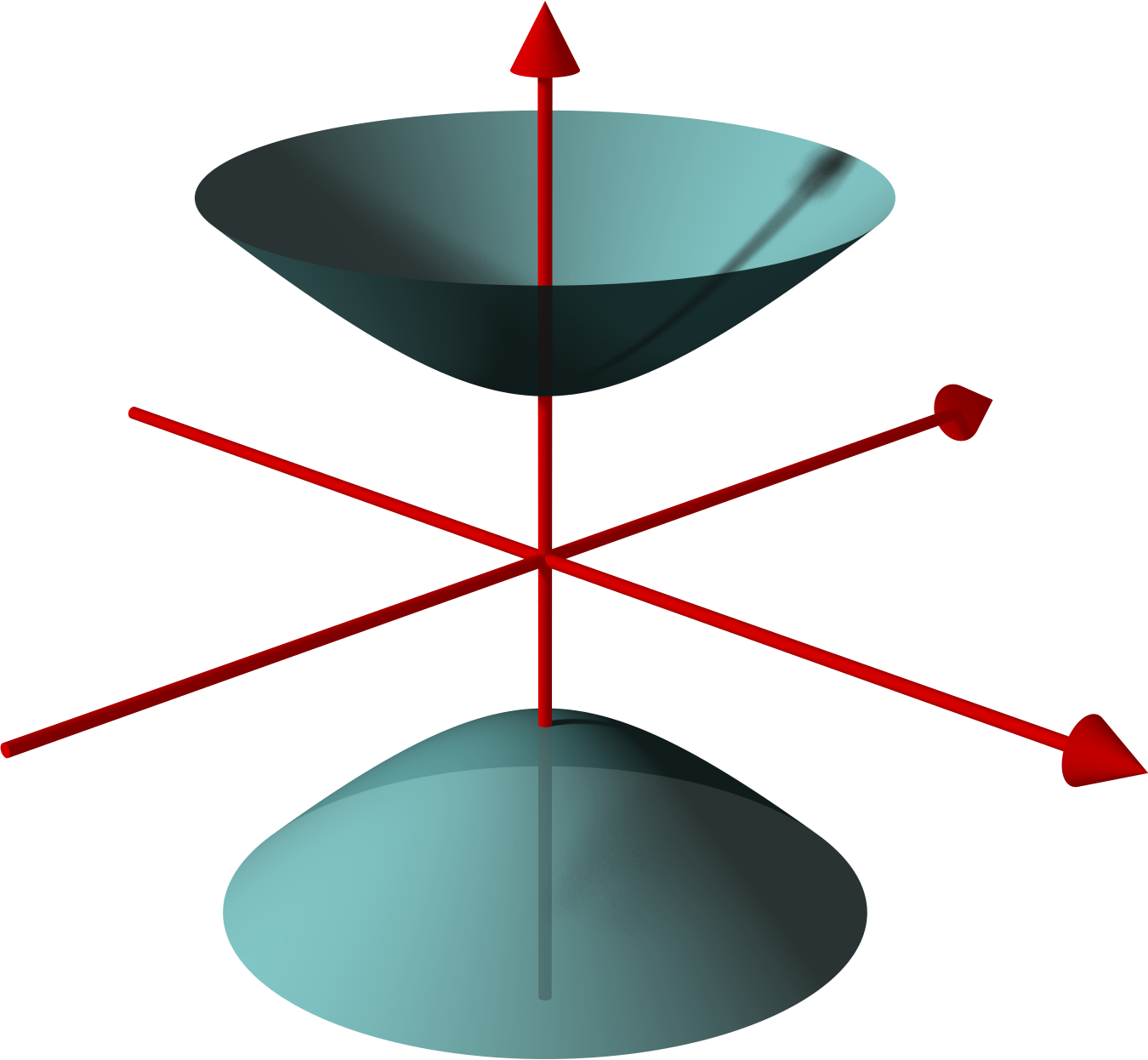
Hyperboloid with two shells

Mathematically, the difference between our universe and the Dichronauts universe is just a single sign switched in the signature of the metric of flat spacetime. Our universe has signature $(-,+,+,+)$ and the Dichronauts universe has signature $(-,-,+,+)$. A sign change in the signature can be shown in a simplified way by the restriction to two dimensions. A scalar product with signature $(+,+)$ on $\mathbb{R}^2$ (with the canonical basis) is given by:

$$\mathbb{R}^2\times\mathbb{R}^2\rightarrow\mathbb{R}^2,
\begin{pmatrix}
x_1 \\
y_1
\end{pmatrix}\cdot\begin{pmatrix}
x_2 \\
y_2
\end{pmatrix}
=x_1x_2
+y_1y_2$$.

A scalar product with signature $(+,-)$ on $\mathbb{R}^2$ (with the canonical basis) is given by:

$$\mathbb{R}^2\times\mathbb{R}^2\rightarrow\mathbb{R}^2,
\begin{pmatrix}
x_1 \\
y_1
\end{pmatrix}\cdot\begin{pmatrix}
x_2 \\
y_2
\end{pmatrix}
=x_1x_2
-y_1y_2$$.

The vectors $(1,0)$ and $(0,1)$ are orthogonal to each other (meaning their scalar product vanishes) for both signatures. But given the vector $(2,1)$, the orthogonal direction is spanned by the vector $(-1,2)$ for the first and $(1,2)$ for the second signature. Only the second signature allows for a vector like $(1,1)$ to be orthogonal to itself. Such vectors describe the propagation of light, for example in this case that one light-year is traveled in one year by definition. In the universe of Dichronauts, this leads to the fact, that not the entire space is filled with light, but that there are two dark cones in opposite directions. Calculations and illustrations of this effect are shown on Greg Egan's website. An interactive applet about the movement and rotation of objects in the Dichronauts universe is also available there.

A fundamental change between our universe and the Dichronauts universe can be seen in mechanics, where a ramp will act upon an object resting on it with a force (to counteract gravity, so the object doesn't fall through the ramp) which is orthogonal to the ramp. When considering the combined force of it with gravity, the resulting net force will always pull the object downwards the ramp in our universe, but will pull it up the ramp in the Dichronauts universe when the slope is below diagonal. As a result, there is negative kinetic energy in the Dichronauts universe. Illustrations of this effect are shown on Greg Egan's website.

In our universe with signature $(-,+,+,+)$, a planet with radius $r$ is described by the inequality $x^2+y^2+z^2\leq r^2$ of a sphere, which is convex, bounded and has a surface with one connected component. In the Dichronauts universe with signature $(-,-,+,+)$, a planet with radius $r$ is described by the inequality $x^2+y^2-z^2\leq r^2$ of a rotating hyperbola, which is concave, non-bounded and has a surface with three connected components. In both cases, the acceleration of gravity is orthogonal to the surface. But not only is "orthogonal" different in both universes, gravity is as well. The Laplace operator is given by $\Delta=\partial_x^2+\partial_y^2+\partial_z^2$ in our universe and $\Delta=\partial_x^2+\partial_y^2-\partial_z^2$ in the Dichronauts universe, which changes the form of the gravitational field given by the Poisson equation (of which the Laplace equation is the special case of no matter). Illustrations of the gravitational field are shown on Greg Egan's website.

== Reception ==
Publishers Weekly writes that the novel is "impressively bizarre" and that "Egan may have out-Eganed himself with this one".

Kirkus Reviews writes, that "Egan specializes in inventing seriously strange worlds" and "this one might well be his weirdest yet", but "the problem is, it's counterintuitive, so downright odd that it's impossible to visualize the inhabitants, their surroundings, or what's going on." The symbiosis has "plenty of other issues" and the migration "is not even particularly original", when compared to Inverted World by Christopher Priest.

Russell Letson writes in the Locus Magazine, to "wind up taking large chunks of Advanced Egan on faith" and to have "found the Orthogonal trilogy and Dichronauts impenetrable", but that "still leaves plenty of Egan to work with."

A French review by Éric Jentile was published in print in Bifrost, #88 in October 2017.
