= Multiple time dimensions =

Concept that there might be more than one dimension of time

The possibility that there might be more than one dimension of time has occasionally been discussed in physics and philosophy. Similar ideas appear in folklore and fantasy literature.

== Physics ==
Speculative theories with more than one time dimension have been explored in physics. The additional dimensions may be similar to conventional time, compactified like the additional spatial dimensions in string theory, or components of a complex time (sometimes referred to as kime).

Itzhak Bars has proposed models of a two-time physics, noting in 2001 that "The 2T-physics approach in d + 2 dimensions offers a highly symmetric and unified version of the phenomena described by 1T-physics in d dimensions."

F-theory, a branch of modern string theory, describes a 12-dimensional spacetime having two dimensions of time, giving it the metric signature (10,2).

The existence of a well-posed initial value problem for the ultrahyperbolic equation (a wave equation in more than one time dimension) demonstrates that initial data on a mixed (spacelike and timelike) hypersurface, obeying a particular nonlocal constraint, evolves deterministically in the remaining time dimension.

Like other complex number variables, complex time is two-dimensional, comprising one real time dimension and one imaginary time dimension, changing time from a real number line into a complex plane. Introducing it into Minkowski spacetime allows a generalization of Kaluza–Klein theory.

Max Tegmark has argued that, if there is more than one time dimension, then the behavior of physical systems could not be predicted reliably from knowledge of the relevant partial differential equations. In such a universe, intelligent life capable of manipulating technology could not emerge. Moreover protons and electrons would be unstable and could decay into particles having greater mass than themselves. This is not a problem if the particles have a sufficiently low temperature.

== Philosophy ==
Multiple time dimensions appear to allow the breaking or re-ordering of cause-and-effect in the flow of any one dimension of time. This and conceptual difficulties with multiple physical time dimensions have been raised in modern analytic philosophy.

As a solution to the problem of the subjective passage of time, J. W. Dunne proposed an infinite hierarchy of time dimensions, inhabited by a similar hierarchy of levels of consciousness. Dunne suggested that, in the context of a "block" spacetime as modelled by General Relativity, a second dimension of time was needed in order to measure the speed of one's progress along one's own timeline. This in turn required a level of the conscious self existing at the second level of time. But the same arguments then applied to this new level, requiring a third level, and so on in an infinite regress. At the end of the regress was a "superlative general observer" who existed in eternity. He published his theory in relation to precognitive dreams in his 1927 book An Experiment with Time and went on to explore its relevance to contemporary physics in The Serial Universe (1934). His infinite regress was criticised as logically flawed and unnecessary, although writers such as J. B. Priestley acknowledged the possibility of his second time dimension.

The esoteric J. G. Bennett described three dimensions or aspects of time: a) Time – Causal or determinate influences on the present moment, b) Eternity – The influences of forms and values, c) Hyparxis – The influences of the Will (freedom) to choose within the present Moment. The physical world, life and consciousness lie in intermediate zones between these dimensions. Physicist David Bohm corresponded with Bennett and they influenced each other's ideas.

== Fiction ==
Multiple independent timeframes, in which time passes at different rates, have long been a feature of stories. Fantasy writers such as J. R. R. Tolkien and C. S. Lewis have made use of these and other multiple time dimensions, such as those proposed by Dunne, in some of their most well-known stories. It has been argued that Tolkien borrowed his ideas for Lórien time in The Lord of the Rings, and that Lewis adopted them for his Chronicles of Narnia.

Science fiction author H. Beam Piper, in his Paratime series of short stories and novel that multiple timelines exist as "worlds of alternate probability on the lateral dimension of time".

Science fiction author Greg Egan wrote the hard science fiction novel Dichronauts, in which the metric signature is (2,2). The characters experience one time dimension perceived time, and the other time dimension as a spatial dimension with geometry distorted by the metric, and strange relativistic effects. In a similar fashion, his series Orthogonal is set in a universe where all 4 dimensions are equivalent, and can all serve as time dimensions. In this series, the relativistic effects between the 4 time-like dimensions is a major plot point.

== See also ==
- Dimensions of spacetime relating to the anthropic principle
- Multiverse, parallel universes
- Time Cube, a pseudoscientific model of time
