= Peter Cornwell (director) =

American-based Australian film director

- Occupation: Filmmaker
- Website: http://www.ward13.com.au

Peter Cornwell is an Australian filmmaker. Cornwell got his start working at the Australian Broadcasting Commission (ABC) in Sydney, Australia. Cornwell left ABC in order to create Trephine Production Studios, which he used to complete his award-winning short Ward 13, a stop motion animation that enjoyed success at several international film festivals. Ward 13 received the FIPRESCI Award from the International Federation of Film Critics at Valladolid, and was short-listed for an Oscar nomination in 2005.

After the success of Ward 13, Cornwell partnered with Gold Circle Films and Lions Gate to direct the psychological horror film The Haunting in Connecticut. The film had its world premiere at the South by Southwest Film Festival in Austin, Texas and stars Virginia Madsen, Kyle Gallner, and Martin Donovan. It was released in March 2009 and went on to gross over $77 million worldwide.

Cornwell also directed the feature film Mercy, an adaptation of Stephen King's short story Gramma, which was produced by Jason Blum's Blumhouse Productions, McG's Wonderland Sound and Vision, and Universal Pictures. Mercy starred Chandler Riggs, Joel Courtney, Frances O'Connor and Mark Duplass.
