= Willie the Weirdo =

Short story by Stephen King

- Short story by Stephen King
- Original title: Willie le Zinzin
- Country: United States
- Language: English, French
- Genre: Horror short story

Publication
- Published in: Timothy McSweeney's Quarterly Concern #66
- Media type: Print
- Publication date: Spring 2022

"Willie the Weirdo" is a short story by Stephen King, first published in English in the June 2022 issue of Timothy McSweeney's Quarterly Concern (having been previously published in French under the title "Willie le Zinzin" in Bifrost in October 2021). It was collected in King's 2024 book, You Like It Darker.

== Plot summary ==
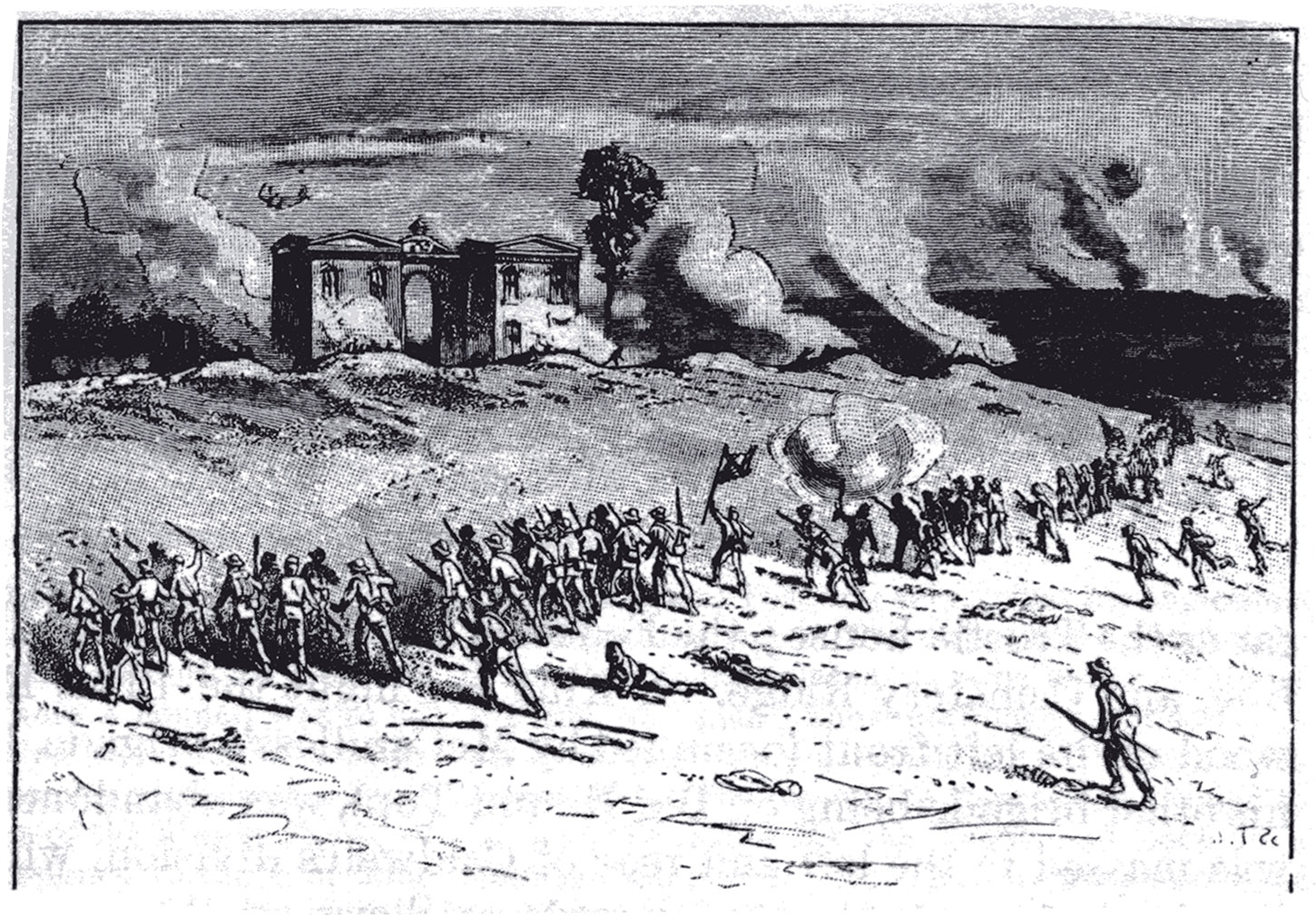
Willie's grandfather claims to have fought on Cemetery Hill in 1863

Willie Fiedler is a 10-year-old boy who is regarded as "weird" by his parents, his sister, and his fellow students due to his unusual habits such as collecting dead insects, staring at clouds, and trapping fireflies in a jar to watch them die. He shares an unusual kinship with James, his adoptive paternal grandfather, who has a habit of running a finger across his philtrum. Willie is fascinated by James' morbid and seemingly unlikely stories about his past experiences, including witnessing a young flag-bearer be shot in the throat on Cemetery Hill while fighting for the Army of Northern Virginia in the 1863 Battle of Gettysburg during the American Civil War.

During the COVID-19 pandemic, James is diagnosed with terminal pancreatic and lung cancer. Willie is unmoved, but curious, requesting to watch James die. When he asks James if there is an afterlife, James cryptically replies "you'd be surprised". One week later, Willie visits James' bedroom as he approaches death. James grabs him by the back of the neck and pulls him closer, saying "You want death? Get a mouthful." Several minutes later, Willie enters the kitchen to tell his parents that James has died, then runs a finger across his philtrum.

== Publication ==
"Willie the Weirdo" was first published in French in issue 104 of Bifrost in October 2021 (as "Willie le Zinzin"). In June 2022, it was published in English in issue 66 of Timothy McSweeney's Quarterly Concern. In 2024, it was collected in King's book You Like It Darker.

== Reception ==
Reviewing You Like It Darker for Bloody Disgusting, Jenn Adams described "Willie the Weirdo" as one of two stories in the collection featuring "unpleasant older men bonding with a younger generation – King's version of generational trauma." Adams suggested that "Willie the Weirdo" "harken[s] back to the unflinching horror of [King's] earlier career" and is "admittedly fascinating in [its] sheer nastiness and cruelty" but "lack[s] the emotional punch of the collection's longer tales". Writing for the Bangor Daily News, Emily Burnham described "Willie the Weirdo" as a "good old fashioned creeper [and] a fun little nastygram". Bev Vincent described "Willie the Weirdo" as "a bit of 'Gramma' crossed with Apt Pupil." Kelly Gorman suggested that the story "is retreading ground King has tread before". Writing for The Guardian, Alison Flood described the story as "deliciously creepy", also noting the resemblance to "Gramma".

Writing for Paste, Matthew Jackson stated that "Willie the Weirdo" "focuses, through the eyes of one very strange child, on the darkness of mortality and a pure confrontation with impending death". Mike Finn described it as a "short but deeply disturbing story". Eric Eisenberg suggested that "it's a story that doesn’t really have a narrative; it's more of a character study about an ominous young boy with macabre sensibilities".

A less positive review was received by Stefano Ferri (writing for Corriere della Sera), who described "Willie the Weirdo" as "the outline of an unfinished novel [which] resolves nothing and dissolves in an insipid ending".

Reviewing You Like It Darker for The Spectator World, Brice Stratford interpreted the collection as being a reflection on King's own life, with "Willie the Weirdo" being an "exploration of old age and mortality".

== See also ==
- "Gramma"
- Stephen King short fiction bibliography
