= Belial (disambiguation) =

Belial or Berial is a term or demon in the Hebrew Bible/Old Testament and New Testament.

Belial may also refer to:

- Belial (Dungeons & Dragons), a Dungeons & Dragons character
- Berial (Devil May Cry), a demon in Devil May Cry 4
- Le Bélial', a French publisher
- Lord Belial, a Swedish black metal band
- Schuyler Belial, a Marvel Comics character
- Ultraman Belial, an Ultraman character
