= Cell (film) =

- Theatrical release poster
- Directed by: Tod Williams
- Screenplay by: Stephen King; Adam Alleca
- Based on: Cell by Stephen King
- Produced by: Richard Saperstein; Michael Benaroya; Brian Witten; Shara Kay
- Starring: John Cusack; Samuel L. Jackson; Isabelle Fuhrman; Owen Teague; Clark Sarullo; Erin Elizabeth Burns; Stacy Keach
- Cinematography: Michael Simmonds
- Edited by: Jacob Craycroft
- Music by: Marcelo Zarvos
- Production companies: Benaroya Pictures; International Film Trust; 120dB Films; Cargo Entertainment; The Genre Company
- Distributed by: Saban Films
- Release date: June 10, 2016
- Running time: 98 minutes
- Country: United States
- Language: English
- Box office: $1.3 million

Cell is a 2016 American science fiction horror film based on the 2006 novel of the same name by Stephen King. The film is directed by Tod Williams, produced by John Cusack, with a screenplay by King and Adam Alleca. The film stars John Cusack, Samuel L. Jackson, and Isabelle Fuhrman. Cell is the second film adaptation of a King story to co-star Cusack and Jackson, after the 2007 film 1408.

The film was released on June 10, 2016 to video on demand, prior to a limited theatrical release scheduled for July 8, 2016. The story follows a New England artist struggling to reunite with his young son after a mysterious signal broadcast over the global cell phone network turns the majority of his fellow humans into mindless vicious animals.

Cell received negative reviews from critics upon its release.

== Plot ==
Artist Clay Riddell abandons his wife Sharon and son Johnny to fulfill his dream of publishing a graphic novel. A year later, at Boston International Airport, Clay calls his family on his cell phone with good news about his new career. His battery dies, so he calls using a payphone. An electronic signal (later dubbed "the pulse") is broadcast across mobile networks worldwide, turning cell phone users into rabid killers. Clay witnesses two planes colliding midair and flees into a subway station. One of the planes crashes and destroys the terminal. Clay meets survivors in a subway car. Train conductor Tom McCourt reveals that the power is out, the train cannot move and the station will flood within hours due to the pumps being shut down. Tom then suggests abandoning the train and traveling through the tunnels. Clay agrees and, joined by a third man, attempts to escape the airport.

Near the tunnel's exit, their companion is slaughtered by an infected man, later dubbed a "phoner". Clay leads Tom to his apartment. That night, they are joined by teenage neighbor Alice Maxwell, who killed her mother in self-defense. All three decide to escape Boston. Heading north through New England to find Sharon and Johnny, the three acquire weapons from a house and are chased by phoners to a nearby river. They hide from the infected, who start emitting signals from their mouths before walking off.

After sundown, the three arrive at a private school and meet two survivors: headmaster Charles Ardai and student Jordan. Charles postulates that the phoners have developed a hive mind and are telepathic. Thousands of phoners lay inert in the school's athletic field. They all emit faint music with static noise from their mouths. Charles plans to use the stadium's gas pumps and a sprayer truck to burn the phoners, and the others agree to help. Clay and Tom drive over the phoners, spraying them with gasoline, which Charles sets ablaze. The fire spreads to the truck, causing an explosion that kills Charles.

The remaining group, now including Jordan, takes shelter at an abandoned drive-in theater. After going to sleep, they all dream of a raggedy-looking man in a red hoodie, a character from Clay's book. Later, they encounter survivors in a roadside bar. There, they learn about Kashwak, a state park in Maine where there is said to be no cell service. After agreeing to travel there, they spend the night in the bar. Survivor Sally is awakened and infected by a group outside. She can now transmit the pulse through her mouth. The group attacks Tom and Jordan. After saving Tom from a phoner, Alice is bludgeoned in the head by Sally, whom Tom kills. The group takes Alice outside, where she succumbs to her head wound.

Later, the group encounters a sleepless Ray Huizenga and his friend Denise, who say that Kashwak is a trap set by the Raggedy Man. Ray becomes agitated, muttering that the Raggedy Man is planting thoughts in his head. He gives Clay his phone and tells him to call the number on it when they reach the end of the road. Ray then kills himself with a bomb. In Ray's truck, the group discovers C-4 explosives. When they reach Sharon's house, Clay learns that Johnny headed for Kashwak and Sharon turned into a phoner. After killing her, Clay drives alone to Kashwak in Ray’s truck, intent on locating Johnny, while the others continue north towards Canada, leaving marks as a trail for Clay.

At Kashwak, Clay finds phoners trapped in a trance, walking in a circle around a communications tower. Clay sees the Raggedy Man at the center of the circle, runs him over and repeatedly shoots him. Then Clay hears his son calling to him from amongst the flock and escapes from the circle. An infected Johnny appears before him, and the Raggedy Man returns to life. Clay hugs Johnny while calling the number on Ray's phone, detonating the explosives in the truck, destroying the tower and the phoners. Clay and Johnny find the marks and follow the trail toward Clay's friends. However, the explosion is actually an illusion: Clay was infected after entering the Raggedy Man's trap and now walks in the circle around the tower.

== Cast ==
- John Cusack as Clayton "Clay" Riddell
- Samuel L. Jackson as Thomas "Tom" McCourt
- Isabelle Fuhrman as Alice Maxwell
- Clark Sarullo as Sharon Riddell
- Ethan Andrew Casto as Johnny Riddell
- Owen Teague as Jordan
- Stacy Keach as Charles Ardai
- Joshua Mikel as Raggedy Man
- Anthony Reynolds as Ray Huizenga
- Erin Elizabeth Burns as Denise
- Jeffrey Hallman as Hog Tied Man
- Mark Ashworth as Bartender
- Wilbur Fitzgerald as Geoff
- Catherine Dyer as Sally
- E. Roger Mitchell as Roscoe
- Alex ter Avest as Chloe
- Gaby Layner as Maddy
- Rey Hernandez as Rick
- Frederick C. Johnson Jr as Rick's Partner
- Michael Beasley as Construction Worker
- Tom Key as Older Man
- Angela Davis as Blood Stained Woman
- Griffin Freeman as Mike Mattick
- Lloyd Kaufman as Bystander

== Production ==
=== Development ===
The film is based on the 2006 novel of the same name by Stephen King. Dimension Films announced in March 2006 that Eli Roth would direct the project after finishing Hostel: Part II. Roth exited the project in 2009, saying:

There was just sort of a difference in opinion on how to make the film and what the story should be, and there's a different direction the studio wants to go with it. It was very friendly because it's the Weinsteins (Bob Weinstein and Harvey Weinstein), they made Inglourious Basterds and we're all friends. I said, 'I'm not really interested in doing the film this way. You guys go ahead and I'm going to make my own films.' I've also learned that I really am only interested in directing original stories that I write, that's another thing I learned through that whole process.

Following Roth's departure, Screen Rant noted that the film "faded into the background". However, in October 2012, John Cusack was announced as the first actor to join the film, followed by the selection of Tod Williams as director in early 2013. In November 2013, Samuel L. Jackson was cast as Tom McCourt. Isabelle Fuhrman was announced as Alice on February 5, 2014, and Stacy Keach was cast in an unnamed role of a headmaster the following day. The film was shot over 25 days in January 2014 in Atlanta, Georgia.

== Release ==
In February 2015, the producers of the film announced that Clarius Entertainment had acquired distribution rights. The company, now called Aviron Pictures, later dropped the film. Saban Capital Group, through its division, Saban Films, later acquired distribution rights to the film. It was to receive its world premiere at FrightFest as part of the Glasgow Film Festival but was replaced at the last minute by Pandemic. The film was released on June 10, 2016, to video on demand, prior to opening in a limited release on July 8, 2016.

== Reception ==
Cell was reviewed negatively by most critics. On the review aggregator website Rotten Tomatoes, the film has an approval rating of 11% based on 57 reviews and an average score of 3.8/10. The site's critical consensus reads, "Shoddily crafted and devoid of suspense, Cell squanders a capable cast and Stephen King's once-prescient source material on a bland rehash of zombie cliches." On Metacritic, the film has a score of 38 out of 100, based on 15 critics, indicating "generally unfavorable" reviews.

Jeannette Catsoulis of The New York Times criticized the film's "bare-bones screenplay" for being "wholly unable to deliver even a smidgen of nuance or depth", and called Cusack's performance "possibly the most detached" of his career. Owen Gleiberman of Variety referred to the outbreak scene in the airport as the "only unsettling scene" in the film, and wrote that "the film is about as close as you could get to a generic low-budget undead thriller". Steve Greene of IndieWire gave the film a grade of "C−", calling it "a character study with a dearth of character", and concluding that the film has "no greater message [...] except that using a Bluetooth headset to call someone from an airport bathroom stall should be punishable by zombification".

Odie Henderson of RogerEbert.com gave the film two-and-a-half stars out of four, commending the performances of Cusack, Jackson, and Keach but criticizing the film's "occasional lack of storytelling clarity", calling it "rushed and unclear in its details about the pulse and its aftermath". Patrick Cooper of Bloody Disgusting called it a "forgettable adaptation" and further stated that "the story packs absolutely no punch and the solid stable of actors look bored for most of the film". Nico Lang of Consequence of Sound wrote that Cell wasted an intriguing premise and called it "unnecessarily glum and grim," as well as "pretty dumb". Bob Grimm of Coachella Valley Independent wrote that the movie "is easily one of the worst adaptations ever of a King story".
