= Itzhak Bars =

American physicist

Itzhak Bars (born 31 August 1943, İzmir, Turkey) is a theoretical physicist at the University of Southern California in Los Angeles.

== Education ==
After receiving his B.S. from Robert College in physics in 1967, Bars obtained his Ph.D. under the supervision of Feza Gürsey at Yale University in 1971.

== Academic life ==
After a postdoctoral research position at the University of California at Berkeley, he joined the faculty of the physics department at Stanford University in 1973. He returned to Yale University in 1975 as a faculty member in the physics department, and after almost a decade, he moved to the University of Southern California in 1984 to build a research group in high-energy theoretical physics. He also served as the director of the Caltech-USC Center for Theoretical Physics during 1999–2003. His long term visiting appointments include Harvard University, Institute for Advanced Study at Princeton, Kavli Institute for Theoretical Physics at Santa Barbara, the Theory Division at CERN, the department of physics at Princeton University and the Perimeter Institute for Theoretical Physics in Canada, where he holds the position of a distinguished visiting research chair.

== Work ==
Bars is a leading expert in symmetries in physics, which he applies in much of his research on particle physics, field theory, string theory, and mathematical physics in over 240 scientific papers. He is the author of a book on "Quantum Mechanics", a co-author of a book on "Extra Dimensions in Space and Time", and co-editor of the books "Strings '95, Future Perspectives in String Theory" and "Symmetry in Particle Physics". Some of his experimentally successful physics predictions include supersymmetry in large nuclei with even/odd numbers of nucleons, and the weak interaction contribution to the anomalous magnetic moment of the muon, in the context of the quantized Standard Model, which was confirmed after 30 years. His contributions to the mathematics of supersymmetry are extensively used in several branches of physics and mathematics.

In 2006, Bars presented the theory that time does not have only one dimension (past/future) but has two separate dimensions instead. Humans normally perceive physical reality as four-dimensional, i.e. three-dimensional space (up/down, back/forth, and side-to-side), and one-dimensional time (past/future). Bars' theory proposes a six-dimensional universe, composed of four-dimensional space and two-dimensional time.

Itzhak Bars's theory was a featured cover story in New Scientist magazine on October 13, 2007, and was again a featured cover story in Filosofia magazine on October 26, 2011. Physicist Joe Polchinski, at the Kavli Institute for Theoretical Physics at UC Santa Barbara, has said "Itzhak Bars has a long history of finding new mathematical symmetries that might be useful in physics... This two-time idea seems to have some interesting mathematical properties." Quoted from Physorg.com article below.

Because of a "gauge symmetry in phase space" at the basis of this 2T-physics theory, only gauge symmetric combinations of the six dimensions can be perceived by physical observers, and this is why humans think there are 3+1 dimensions rather than the underlying 4+2 large (not curled up) dimensions. However, with enough guidance, the 4+2 dimensional structure can be perceived indirectly by observers in 3+1 dimensions as predicted effects that, when correctly interpreted, reveal the underlying 4+2 dimensional universe.

To explain to the layman how this gauge symmetry works, Bars makes an analogy between the phenomena in the 4+2 dimensional world and events happening in a hypothetical 3-dimensional room. In this analogy, the two-dimensional surfaces that make up the boundaries of the three-dimensional room (walls, ceiling, floor) are the counterparts of the 3+1 dimensional world humans live in as observers. In this setting, if you shine light from different directions in the room, you create two-dimensional shadows of the three-dimensional events projected on the surfaces surrounding the room. The shadows and their motions on some walls will look different than those on other walls, ceilings, or floors. If observers were never allowed to exist in the room but were confined to live and crawl only on the surfaces of surrounding boundaries, the two-dimensional physicist at different boundaries would then write different physics equations to describe mathematically the shadows they see from those different perspectives. They would also believe that the shadows at different boundaries are different physical systems because their equations would not match.

Since all shadows come from the unique set of events in the room, it is evident from the perspective of the room that the shadows are not independent of each other. So, there must be a definite predicted relationship between the systems of the two-dimensional equations at different walls. If the two-dimensional physicists are very smart, with much effort they may begin to discover this hidden information by carefully comparing equations of apparently different systems and from this indirectly understand that what appeared to be many different physical systems are really simply understood as the many shadows of a single set of three-dimensional events that happen in the room. This would look like a fantastic unification of complicated systems in two dimensions as a single simple system in three dimensions.

According to Bars, this analogy conveys the relationship between 1T-physics in 3+1 dimensions (like the physics on the boundaries of the room) and 2T-physics (like physics in the room). The requirement of only gauge-symmetric combinations of 4+2 dimensions demanded by the gauge symmetry is what forces the observers to experience all phenomena as if they live in 3+1 dimensions. Bars has provided many examples of the hidden information as predictions for 1T-physics coming from 2T-physics at all energy levels, from every day well understood classical and quantum physics to much less understood boundaries of physics in cosmology and high energy physics. He believes that the 2T-physics approach provides powerful new tools to explore the less known aspects of the universe and build the right unified theory.

Bars's current interests include string field theory, 2T-physics which he originated in 1998, cosmology and black holes and particle physics at accelerators. In 2006 he established that all the physics we know today, as embodied in principle in the Standard Model of Particles and Forces and General Relativity, emerges from a new kind of gauge symmetric theory (in position-momentum phase space) based on a space-time of 4 space and 2 time dimensions. The physical gauge invariant sector, of this 4+2 dimensional reformulation of all physics, yields a holographic projection (like a shadow) onto a "boundary" of 4+2 dimensions. This boundary is an emergent space-time with 3-space and 1-time dimensions where we exist as observers that interpret all phenomena that occur within the 4+2 dimensional universe. This reformulation of physics predicts new correlations among physical phenomena that are not provided by the traditional 1 time formalism and therefore yields new information that was not available before. An important prediction of this approach is that the Standard Model coupled to General Relativity must be invariant under local scaling transformations in 3+1 dimensions. This local Weyl symmetry in turn provides new tools to investigate new features of 3+1 dimensional space-time in the very early cosmological history of the universe and in the interior of black holes.

== Honours and awards ==
- 1988 Elected Fellow of the American Physical Society "for formulation, development, and application of symmetry and supersymmetry principles in unified gauge theories, composite models of quarks and leptons, nuclear supersymmetry, feeble forces, superstring and supermembrane theories*
- A.P. Sloan Foundation Fellowship
