= Ghost Brigade =

1993 film

- DVD case featuring one of the film's alternate titles, Grey Knight
- Directed by: George Hickenlooper
- Written by: Matt Greenberg
- Produced by: Steven Stabler; Brad Krevoy
- Starring: Martin Sheen; Corbin Bernsen; Adrian Pasdar
- Cinematography: Kent L. Wakeford
- Edited by: Monte Hellman; Esther P. Russell
- Production company: MPCA (Motion Picture Corporation of America)
- Distributed by: MPCA
- Release date: March 7, 1993 (Santa Barbara Film Festival)
- Running time: 80 minutes 92 minutes (director's cut)
- Country: United States
- Language: English

Ghost Brigade is a 1993 American supernatural horror film set during the American Civil War and directed by George Hickenlooper. Starring Corbin Bernsen, Adrian Pasdar, and Martin Sheen, the film was also released under the alternate titles The Killing Box, Grey Knight, and The Lost Brigade.

== Plot ==
Slave traders bring back an evil voodoo entity that is accidentally freed by the Confederate Army during the Civil War. The entity possesses the bodies of the dead soldiers to create an army of its own bent on conquest, using the corpses of both the North and South. When both Union and Confederate soldiers are mysteriously murdered by the entity during the Civil War, the opposing troops must overcome their differences and band together to investigate the gruesome deaths. It soon becomes apparent that these killers are anything but human. Instead, they are a maniacal regiment of supernatural forces, and it is solely up to these united American soldiers to fight the slaughterous evil of the Ghost Brigade.

The film centers around Captain John Harling, a Union army man that has been awaiting the end of his enlistment; it is cut short when there are unusual murders of Union troops. To discover the culprits behind this Harling seeks Colonel Nehemiah Strayn, a former Confederate regiment commander, now sitting in a Union prison at Bowling Green, who was once Harling's teacher. The two officers, along with Colonel George Thalman supervising, set out with a small detachment of troops and a runaway slave named Rebecca. When they reach the site where several Union troops were murdered, Strayn tells about what happened to his regiment, whose gruesome end happened at the same place where the Union corpses were found.

After leaving the site and wandering deeper into Tennessee, they come across a group of Confederate soldiers, who quickly surrender, much to the surprise of the Union troops. The Confederate in charge tells Thalman that their group was attacked by a band of undead troops who took many of his men away, yet he was unaware of why he and his people were taken. Thalman, deciding that they require reinforcements, takes off leaving Harling in charge. But during the night, while Strayn and Rebecca are talking just a few yards away from the camp, they are assaulted by Strayn's old regiment, now a bunch of walking zombies. His former second-in-command, Major Josiah Elkins, tells him to lead this new regiment. Strayn refuses the offer, however, and escapes with Rebecca to the camp. Strayn warns everyone at the camp and they all hide behind the carts that the Confederates had with them and wait until the zombie soldiers approach them. After holding them off, they are surprised to see Thalman reappear again, but he has been changed. After being burned by Rebecca he returns to his former self, But before he dies, he puts Harling in charge, in hopes that Harling will see the men out.

The next day, since they do not have time to leave the area, they set a trap for the Ghost Brigade. Using Strayn to lure them back to the Union camp, he surprises them by picking up a pistol and killing one of them with a silver bullet which was created from the silver that the Confederates were carrying. The Ghost Brigade goes into a fury and attacks the joint Union/Confederate troops, who are positioned behind a trench filled with water and wagons turned into barricades. Strayn personally fights with Elkins in hand-to-hand combat before Elkins stabs him. Before he can finish Strayn, Rebecca leaps on top of him. The short struggle continues until Rebecca shoots Elkins by aiming at her chest when he was behind her. While barely alive, Harling realizes that she is infected and has to be shot. Strayn tries to intervene but Rebecca is shot. The last remaining zombie soldier cries over Elkin's corpse before he is shot by Harling. With the Ghost Brigade defeated, they head back for Union territory, where Strayn is sent back to Bowling Green prison for a short period, before he escapes and rejoins the Confederate Army. He fights with distinction during the battles of Gettysburg and other major Civil War battles, but his unusual stand against slavery alienates many of his countrymen. While Strayn is fighting in the Confederate Army, Harling decides to not take his parole and stays with the Union Army for the duration of the war, serving under General U.S. Grant for the remainder of the Civil War.

The film ends with Harling telling the story of Strayn going back to the creek where his regiment was murdered, where he is never seen again.

== Cast ==
- Corbin Bernsen as Colonel Nehemiah Strayn
- Martin Sheen as General Haworth
- Billy Bob Thornton as Langston
- Adrian Pasdar as Captain John Harling
- David Arquette as Murphy
- Alexis Arquette as Corporal Dawson
- Jon Beatty as Lieutenant
- Dean Cameron as Borne
- Josh Evans as Lt. Regis
- Allison 'A.J.' Langer as Thomas, the drummer boy
- Matt LeBlanc as Terhune
- Jefferson Mays as Martin Bradley
- Oliver Muirhead as Richard Bradley
- Steve Price as Captain Donnelly
- Mark Salzman as Corporal
- Cynda Williams as Rebecca
- Roger Wilson as Major Josiah Elkins
- Ray Wise as Colonel George Thalman

== Release ==
Ghost Brigade was released on VHS by Turner Home Entertainment in May 1995. Turner later re-released the film again on VHS on August 25, 1998. Vanguard Cinema released the film on DVD on January 1, 2005. The director's cut was released on November 1 that same year.

== Reception ==
Richard Natale of Variety described it as "part art-house item and part mainstream horror". Natale wrote that it has "more promise than payoff" but praised Bernsen's acting. Nigel Floyd of Time Out London called it "an arty zombie film" that is "involving, with dark undertones". Author and film critic Leonard Maltin awarded the film 2.5 out of 4 stars, stating that the film "aspires to a Peckinpah-type brutality but generally opts for mere shock value." Charles Tatum from eFilmCritic gave the film 2/5 stars, stating that the film was entertaining, with good direction, and felt that it had an interesting idea. However, Tatum noted that the film "shows classic symptoms of post-production tampering", which greatly reduced its effectiveness.

Writing in The Zombie Movie Encyclopedia, academic Peter Dendle said, "The movie features strong conceptual underpinnings, though it's a little dragged down by the tritely over-demonized foes." TV Guide gave the film a negative 1/4 stars, writing, "wastes so much time filling in details of the cadaver squadron it seems longer than the Battle of Gettysburg. Trying for the hallucinatory atmosphere of the film version of Ambrose Bierce's OCCURRENCE AT OWL CREEK BRIDGE, this unusual chiller falls prey to mundane scripting, combat-booted direction, and inferior sound mixing."
