= Keep Watching =

- Theatrical release poster
- Directed by: Sean Carter
- Written by: Joseph Dembner
- Produced by: Nicolas Chartier; Andrew Rona; Alex Heineman; Craig J. Flores; Michael Fiore; Joseph Dembner
- Starring: Bella Thorne; Ioan Gruffudd; Natalie Martinez; Chandler Riggs; Leigh Whannell; Matthew Willig; Christopher James Baker
- Cinematography: Sharone Meir
- Edited by: Christopher S. Capp
- Music by: Tyler Bates
- Production company: Voltage Pictures
- Distributed by: Screen Gems (through Sony Pictures Releasing)
- Release date: October 31, 2017
- Running time: 89 minutes
- Country: United States
- Language: English
- Budget: <$5 million
- Box office: $94,178

Keep Watching is a 2017 American horror thriller film directed by Sean Carter and written by Joseph Dembner. It was produced by Nicolas Chartier, Andrew Rona, Alex Heineman, Craig J. Flores, Michael Fiore, and Joseph Dembner. It stars Bella Thorne, Ioan Gruffudd, Natalie Martinez, Chandler Riggs, Leigh Whannell, Matthew Willig and Christopher James Baker.

The film was released on October 31, 2017, by Screen Gems and later, on DVD.

== Plot ==
The film starts with a young girl being attacked. The next morning, news reporters interview people who had seen the murder through their devices, unaware that it was real, and a news reporter says that one of the family members is missing.

Jamie Miller – a teenage girl – and her family return home from a 10-day vacation, unaware that cameras have been set up in every corner of the house. Later that night, her father Adam gets an unexpected visit from his brother Matt, who comes over and asks to spend the night there. Adam agrees, but his new wife Olivia is not happy about it. Matt talks with Jamie and she says that she is not fond of her new stepmother Olivia, thinking that she is trying to replace her real mother, but Matt assures Jamie that she has nothing to worry about.

Jamie Skype calls her boyfriend Josh, intending to tell him she might be pregnant, but backs out and ends the call. When everyone gets ready for bed, Matt goes outside to look for his phone and hears strange noises coming from the backyard. He is attacked with a hook. A man known as The Terror breaks into the house and takes everyone's phones, then seals all the windows outside, waking up Olivia.

Adam goes downstairs to see what the noise is and finds a flashlight with a bow on it. When he goes into the kitchen, a photo of someone standing behind him is taken, and he is smothered to death with a plastic bag in front of everyone. Jamie, her brother DJ and Olivia barricade themselves in Olivia's bedroom and they find that the family has been watched for months without anyone knowing, especially Jamie. They learn that their only chance to survive is to kill The Terror. As the remaining family members try to look for a way out, they are attacked by another intruder and they all hide in the basement, where a knife with a bow on it is discovered.

Police are heard, but they soon realize that it is a recording. Josh comes to the house and is filmed being killed by suffocation with a running hose. Olivia finds a way out of the house and she finds a red X taped on the ground by the gate.

Matt finds her but soon gets killed with an axe. Just as Olivia escapes, a van pulls up. She climbs in the back and gets attacked again. DJ is locked in a room while Jamie is attacked. She finds a red X and uses a taser she found earlier in her room on the intruder and DJ kills the intruder with a knitting needle. They unmask the intruder, revealing it to be Marissa Vasquez, who was reported missing from the family in the last murder.

Thinking they are safe, Jamie and DJ look around and find Olivia's body, Jamie's positive pregnancy test and videos of her mother and father with baby Jamie. Soon enough, they discover that people all over the world are watching and Jamie tries to tell them to call the police, but is bleeped out so no-one will know their address. Jamie finds a mask with a bow on it, while her and DJ plan to escape.

While walking around the house, they find The Terror. Jamie pours gasoline on him and DJ throws a lighter on him, setting the house on fire in the process. Jamie and DJ escape only to be captured by The Creator and The Terror who survived. They discover that the girl (Marissa) they killed was the missing member of the previous family, kidnapped and forced to aid them in the attack on Jamie's family. The Creator tells Jamie that if she aids them, her brother will be safe. The Creator tasers Jamie and says that she will give the online audience a reason to keep watching.

== Cast ==
- Bella Thorne as Jamie Miller, a troubled teenager.
  - Savannah Douglas as young Jamie
- Chandler Riggs as DJ Miller, Jamie's brother and Adam's son.
- Ioan Gruffudd as Adam Miller, Jamie and DJ's father.
- Natalie Martinez as Olivia, Adam's new wife.
- James Connor as Therapist, whom Jamie is seeing professionally.
- Maya Eshet as Marissa Vasquez / The Wasp
- Matthew Willig as The Terror
- Leigh Whannell as Matt Miller, Adam's brother and Jamie and DJ's uncle.
- April McCullough as Betty Miller, Jamie's mother and Adam's ex wife.
- Jared Abrahamson as Josh Canfield, Jamie's boyfriend.
- Christopher James Baker as The Creator
  - Roger Craig Smith as the voice of The Creator

== Production ==
Originally titled Home Invasion, the screenplay was developed by former Silver Pictures executive Alex Heineman with screenwriter Joseph Dembner. In early 2013, Producer Michael Fiore and Director Sean Carter developed and filmed a sequence from Dembner's script in coordination with the producing team at Silver Pictures and Dembner. That demo secured Sean Carter's role as director on the feature version. In April 2013, Voltage Pictures secured the rights to the screenplay. In July 2013, Bella Thorne was the first confirmed name, announced as the lead role, Jamie. In September 2013, Natalie Martinez was also confirmed. Ioan Gruffudd and Chandler Riggs completed the main cast in October. Filming began in Altadena, California, in late November 2013.

== Release ==
In October 2015, Screen Gems acquired distribution rights to the film, changing the title from Home Invasion to Keep Watching. The film was originally scheduled to be released on December 2, 2016. It was released for one night on October 31, 2017.

== Reception ==
On Starburst magazine, Scott Clark rated it 3/10 describing the film as "bad writing, uninspired filmmaking" and with "crap dialogue." On Common Sense Media, Jeffrey M. Anderson rated it 1/5 stars writing that "this horror-thriller uses its dozens (hundreds?) of hidden cameras as a gimmick, which constantly distracts from the story ... even though the story and themes are absurdly thin."

== See also ==
- List of films featuring home invasions
