= The Eternal Flame (novel) =

2012 science-fiction book

- Author: Greg Egan
- Language: English
- Series: Orthogonal
- Genre: Science fiction
- Publisher: Night Shade Books
- Publication date: 2012
- Publication place: Australia
- Followed by: The Arrows of Time

The Eternal Flame is a hard science-fiction novel by Australian author Greg Egan and the second part of the Orthogonal trilogy. The novel was published by Night Shade Books on 26 August 2012 with a cover art by Cody Tilson and by Gollancz on 8 August 2013 with a cover art by Greg Egan. The novel describes the journey of the generation ship Peerless, which has departed in The Clockwork Rocket, and the development of new technology as well as changes of the society on board. An essential task is the construction of an engine not needing any fuel to generate thrust, but instead perfectly balancing out the radiation it emits with the energy this generates. To make such a process work, the universe of the novel is based on a Riemannian instead of a Lorentzian manifold (which describes our own universe, where emitting radiation instead consumes energy), changing the rules of physics. The details are described by Greg Egan on his website. The story is continued in The Arrows of Time.

== Plot ==
Three generations after the departure of the Peerless from the home world, the ever increasing population (which can't be controlled due to spontaneous reproduction) overstreches its limited capacities. For a drastic solution, newborns are euthanized. The long mission of research is continued in the meantime: Tamara, an astronomer, studies an object on a course close to the Peerless and plans to dispatch the spacecraft Gnat to it. Carla, a physicist, studies light and finds a seemingly perfect ratio of five to four in one of her experiments. It has already been discovered that Nereo's equation (corresponding to the Maxwell equations) makes wrong predictions. She conducts further experiments with her students to gather more data. Patrizia, one of these students, later goes over the mathematics of collisions and comes up with the hypothesis of quantization for particles of light, later known as Patrizia's principle (corresponding to the Planck relation). She proposes luxites as names for the quanta after the luxagens causing them and an already proposed idea by an ancient philiosopher without evidence. Carla renames them into photons to avoid confusion. First surprised by the ingenious idea, which explains the data and in which an integer number of photons is necessary to give the luxagens enough energy to leave an energy valley, she soon notices some problems. She had studied wavelengths for which four or five photons carry enough energy and now wants to conduct new experiments for which six are necessary.

Carlo, a biologist, measures signals used by animals and himself to shapeshift their bodies. Previously it has been discovered through coloring, how their flesh can end up in different parts of their limbs during this process, giving rise to the question about how the ever changing communication with the brain works. Special attention is given to the signals by males to initiate reproduction. There are two kinds of species, where the females either divide in two or four children (biparous and quadriparous, latter of which is their own species). Carlo intends to measures those signals and swap them, potentially transferring the division into only two children artificially to their own species, solving the population crisis. Their way of reproduction also poses a problem to Tamaro, the co of Tamara and therefore supposed to trigger hers, who doesn't want her to go on board the Gnat and hence risk the lives of their children. Together with their father Erminio, he imprisons Tamara and spreads news about her having given birth on the Peerless. Tamara can persuade Tamaro with a deal to let her go free and later joins the mission on the Gnat with Carla and Ivo. They cause an almost fatal detonation for them near the Object, pushing it on an almost parallel course with the Peerless. It turns out, that the thermodynamic arrow and the arrow of entropy decrease of the Object point in the opposite directions and hence contact of any matter from the Peerless with the Object would again result in a detonation.

Carlo travels through the forest section inside the Peerless to catch the four arborines (two pairs of cos) for experiments. He then records the light signal of Zosimo when triggering the splitting of Zosima in two children and then sends it into one half of Benigna to mimick Benigno triggering her splitting. Benigna sheds a single female child and survives the birth injured. A successful experiment on their own species could turn the next election around, but time is running out. When this achievement is made public on the Peerless some males, fearing their upcoming extinction, set the entire forest on fire. Tamara, not wanting them to have the last word with violence, but knowing about the fatal consequences of Carlo's last experiment, agrees to have the arborine signal transmitted into a part of her body. She also sheds a single female child, who she named Erminia after her mother, and survives injured. Message of the birth is made public and swings the vote around, making the new technology available for every female choosing it and hence solving the population crisis.

Carla revisits some of the newly discovered physics and is saddened by the fact, that her legacy will ultimately only be to have taught Patrizia, whose name will go down in history with Patrizia's principle. She does some sketches involving an atom with three different orbitals as well as the emission and absorption of photons, one of which is reflected by a moving mirror to change its frequency, and finally realizes to just have come up with a process to make the eternal flame possible. Some time later, the space probe Eternal Flame is dispatched into space to demonstrate the engine indeed working, solving the fuel crisis. Some others, including Tamara and her daughter Erminia, are also watching. Carlo tells Carla to be delighted to have saved her life with his new technology, but she refuses to immediately make use of it, as she rather wants to wait what the new day will bring.

== Background (literature) ==
Due to Greg Egan begin very popular in Japan, the novel was released by Hayakawa Publishing in Japanese as エターナル・フレイム (etānaru fureimu, direct transcription of the original English title into Katakana) in 2016. The translation was done by Makoto Yamagishi (山岸真) and Toru Nakamura (中村融).

The novel was a Locus Award Nominee for Best SF Novel in 2013 and reached the 20th place.

== Background (mathematics and physics) ==
The consequences of the sign change in the metric on the laws of physics are explained in detail (with illustrations and calculations) on Greg Egan's website. The correspondence of the principles presented in the novel with those in our universe are explained in the afterword of the novel.

One insight about the Riemannian universe described in the novel is the description of Dirac spinors, the solutions of the Dirac equation, by quaternions. A similar mathematical description is not possible in a Lorentzian universe like ours. Dirac matrices $\gamma$ are defined using the underlying metric $\eta$ in their anticommutator relation $\{\gamma^\mu,\gamma^\nu\}=\gamma^\mu\gamma^\nu+\gamma^\nu\gamma^\mu=2\eta^{\mu\nu}$. Switching a sign in the metric results in the corresponding Dirac matrix to be multiplied with the imaginary number $i$. This is known as the Wick rotation relating Riemannian with Lorentzian geometry through the concept of imaginary time. Dirac matrices (and hence Dirac spinors) in a four-dimensional spacetime are four-dimensional, but there is no connection between the numbers. In a five-dimensional spacetime, they would also be four-dimensional. Quaternions are composed out of four real numbers and therefore also four-dimensional. This makes it possible to formulate the Dirac equation in a Riemannian universe entirely with quaternions. The calculations are described by Greg Egan on his website.

The Dirac equation also provides another important concept for the novel. As it is constructed as a square root of the Klein–Gordon equation (a relativistic generalization of the Schrödinger equation), the energies of its solutions are affected by the same problem as the square roots of positive numbers, which is the ambiguity of the sign. This led to the theoretical discovery of antimatter in 1928 before the first observation of a positron (the antiparticle of the electron) in 1932. But as negative energy poses certain problems in further calculations, the negative sign is often shifted to time using the uncertainty principle of energy and time. This interpretation in quantum field theory of antimatter traveling backward through time is known as the Feynman–Stückelberg interpretation. Ordinary matter and antimatter colliding results in their total annihilation, which happens in the novel and explained with the opposite arrows of time. A different situation arises in the sequel The Arrows of Time after the Peerless has turned around and inverted its own arrow of time.

== Reception ==
David Brin, Hugo and Nebula Award-winning author of Earth and Existence, claims that "Greg Egan is a master of 'what-if' science fiction". His "characters work out the implications and outcomes as they struggle to survive and prevail" and he presents "the most original alien race since Vernor Vinge's Tines".

Jerry Oltion, Nebula Award-winning author of Abandon in Place, claims that "when most people switch a minus sign for a plus, they re-do the math. Egan re-does the entire universe."

Karen Burnham, writing in Strange Horizons, says that "the physics is mind-blowing" and that "Egan develops almost all of the ideas in the story through dialogue. Some people may say that when the dialogue occurs the action grinds to a halt. However, it's clear that in these novels, the dialogue is the action." Concerning the struggles with reproduction, she writes that "more than any Egan story to date, the books of the Orthogonal trilogy place science in a broader social context". In a review of the sequel The Arrows of Time, she adds that "in order to get there, we tour through a huge amount of speculative world building, physics, biology, and sociology."

A French review by Éric Jentile was published in print in Bifrost, #88 in October 2017.
