= Mercy (2014 film) =

2014 American supernatural horror film by Peter Cornwell

- Promotional image
- Directed by: Peter Cornwell
- Written by: Matt Greenberg
- Based on: "Gramma" by Stephen King
- Produced by: Jason Blum; McG; Mary Viola
- Starring: Frances O'Connor; Shirley Knight; Chandler Riggs; Joel Courtney; Dylan McDermott; Mark Duplass
- Cinematography: Bryon Shah
- Edited by: Toby Yates; William Yeh
- Music by: Reza Safinia
- Production companies: Blumhouse Productions; Wonderland Sound and Vision
- Distributed by: Universal Pictures
- Release date: October 7, 2014 (United States)
- Running time: 79 minutes
- Country: United States
- Language: English

Mercy is a 2014 American supernatural horror film written by Matt Greenberg, directed by Peter Cornwell, and starring Frances O'Connor, Shirley Knight, Chandler Riggs, Joel Courtney, Dylan McDermott and Mark Duplass. It is loosely based on the 1984 short story "Gramma" by Stephen King. It was produced by Jason Blum for his Blumhouse Productions banner and McG. The film was released straight to video by Universal Pictures Home Entertainment on October 7, 2014.

== Plot ==
A single mother (Frances O’Connor) and her two children George (Chandler Riggs) and Buddy (Joel Courtney) go to help take care of their grandmother (Shirley Knight) who has mystical powers.

== Cast ==
- Frances O'Connor as Rebecca McCoy
- Chandler Riggs as George Bruckner
- Joel Courtney as Buddy Bruckner
- Shirley Knight as Mercy
  - Pepper Binkley as Young Mercy
- Dylan McDermott as Jim Swann
- Mark Duplass as Uncle Lanning
- Amanda Walsh as Charlotte
- Harley Graham as Phoebe
- Joe Egender as Wendell
- Eddie Jones as Pastor Gregory Luke

== Production ==
On October 25, 2012, it was announced Peter Cornwell would direct the film from a script by Matt Greenberg, and that Frances O'Connor had been attached to star. On November 30, 2012, it was reported Chandler Riggs had joined the cast of the film, opposite Joel Courtney in the lead roles.

== Release ==
The film was released on DVD and Blu-ray by Universal Pictures Home Entertainment on October 7, 2014.

== Reception ==
On Dread Central, Staci Layne Wilson rated it 2,5/5 stars writing that "the story isn’t all that original for true horror lovers, and the use of CGI is egregiously excessive (...) Still in all, I recommend Mercy for fans of King."
