= Gramma (short story) =

- Short story by Stephen King
- Country: United States
- Language: English
- Genres: Fantasy, horror, short story

Publication
- Published in: Weirdbook (1st release), Skeleton Crew
- Media type: Magazine (1st release)
- Publication date: 1984

"Gramma" is a short horror story by American author Stephen King. It was first published in the Spring 1984 issue of Weirdbook magazine and collected in King's 1985 collection, Skeleton Crew. King incorporated elements from works of H. P. Lovecraft in this story, making it a story set in the Cthulhu Mythos.

== Plot summary ==
11-year-old George Bruckner is at home in Castle Rock, Maine with his mother, Ruth, when they find out that George's 13-year-old brother Buddy has broken his ankle playing baseball. George reluctantly volunteers to watch his bedridden grandmother while Ruth picks up Buddy at the hospital. After she leaves, George recalls a terrifying memory from five years ago when his "Gramma" wanted to hug him, making him cry until his mom managed to pacify the situation. As he continues waiting for his mom to return, more repressed memories begin to surface.

He recalls overhearing his mother's siblings begging her to care for the old woman, forcing her to leave San Francisco and move to Castle Rock. George also recalls that Gramma had been kicked out of her church and dismissed from her position as a schoolteacher for owning particular books. Finally he remembers that Gramma's first two children were stillborn, and that it was only after obtaining the books that she gave birth to nine healthy children.

George suddenly hears noises coming from her room. While checking on her, he remembers his Gramma uttering strange words one night, and a neighbor dying the next morning.

These recollections convince George that his grandmother is a witch who gained dark powers from reading the forbidden tomes. Seeing Gramma's unresponsive body, George believes that she has died. After doing some tests that convince him that she is indeed dead, he attempts to call the doctor but the phone is dead. He grows more anxious, but returns to her room to cover her face.

Suddenly, she grasps his wrist. George flees the room in a panic. He hears groaning from the room, and then his Gramma calls him. He returns to the room and sees Gramma sitting on her chair. She orders him to come to her. A supernatural force compels him towards her arms but he manages to break free. He makes his way back to the kitchen and the phone rings. His Aunt Flo is on the other end. As Gramma follows George to the kitchen, Aunt Flo tells George to command her to stop by invoking the name Hastur. He does so, but not before she embraces him.

An hour later, Ruth returns to find George seemingly unharmed. He tells her that Gramma died as his mother asks if anything else happened. George says no, and goes off to his room to sleep. Once he is alone, George uses a spell to kill his Aunt Flo with an aneurysm. The story ends with George planning to torture his brother with his newfound power.

== Film, television, and theatrical adaptations ==
The story was made into an episode of The Twilight Zone in 1986; the screenplay was written by Harlan Ellison. Piper Laurie provided some of the voice of Gramma. She had previously starred in the first film adaptation of King's novel Carrie as Carrie’s mother.

In 2014, the story was adapted into a feature film titled Mercy. Chandler Riggs portrayed George in the film. It received mixed reviews.

"Gramma" was translated into Marathi by Indian writer Narayan Dharap as "Aaji", which served as a basis for the opening act of Tumbbad (2018 film).

== See also ==
- Stephen King short fiction bibliography
- "Willie the Weirdo"
