= Owen Teague =

American actor

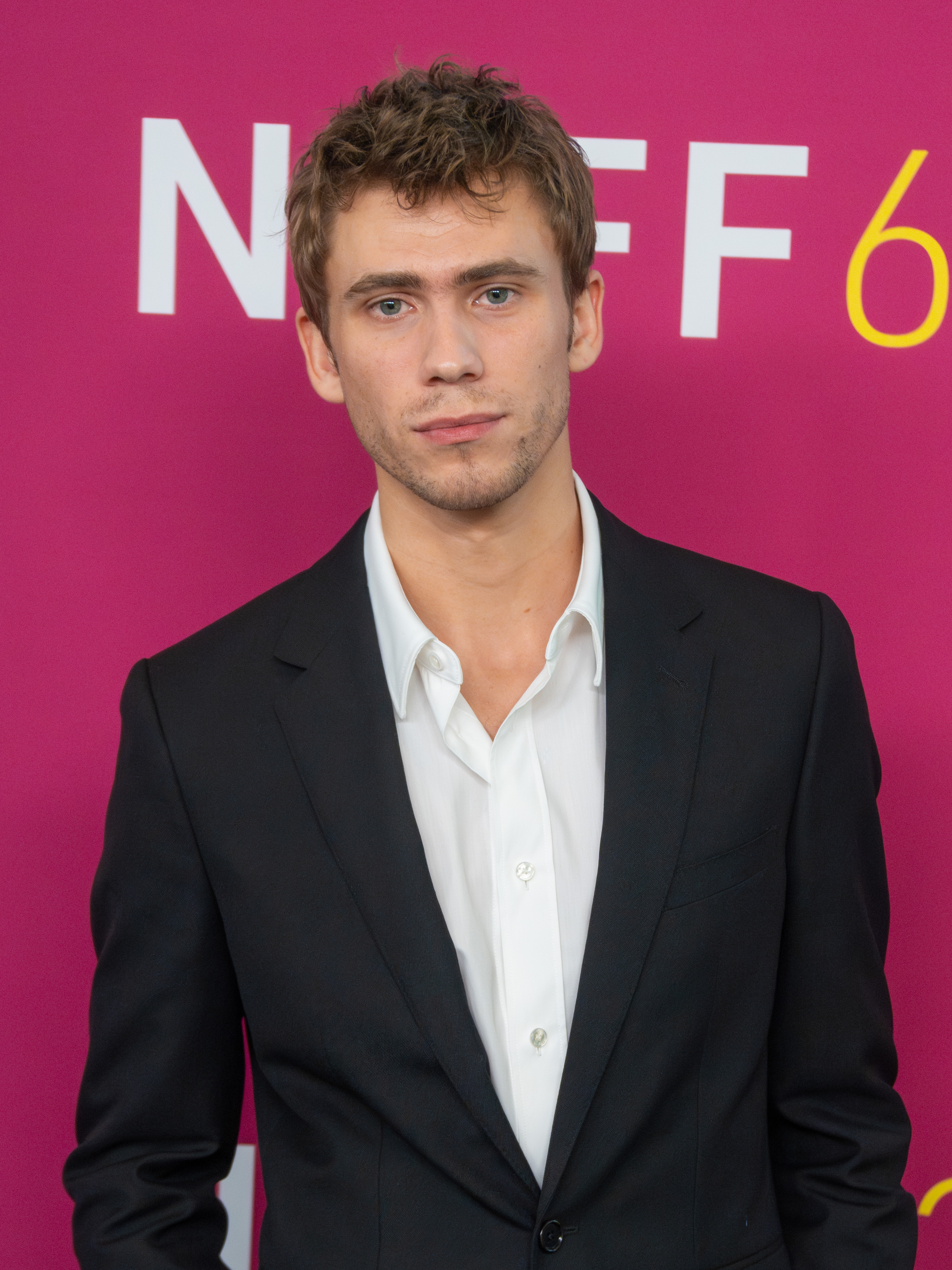
- Teague in 2024
- Born: Owen William Teague; Tampa, Florida, U.S.
- Occupation: Actor
- Years active: 2012–present

Owen William Teague is an American actor. He first came to attention playing the psychopathic bully Patrick Hockstetter in It (2017) and It Chapter Two (2019), followed by main cast roles in the miniseries Mrs. Fletcher (2019) and The Stand (2020–2021). He played the antagonized young adult son of the title character in the film To Leslie (2022) and starred in his first lead film role as the chimpanzee Noa in Kingdom of the Planet of the Apes (2024).

== Early life and education ==
Teague was born and raised in Tampa, Florida. Both his parents were musicians and he played violin until 15. Teague was interested in acting beginning at a young age, performing scenes from Beauty and the Beast with stuffed animals at the age of four and appearing in small theater productions soon thereafter. He was a member of the Movie Makers Club at Macfarlane Park International Baccalaureate Elementary and the thespian club and orchestra at Howard W. Blake High School School of the Arts, both in Tampa.

== Career ==
Teague is known for his roles in Bloodline (2015) and "Arkangel", an episode of the fourth season of Black Mirror (2017).

In 2016, he was cast in a supporting role in the supernatural thriller The Empty Man, based on a graphic novel by Cullen Bunn. He played Nolan Rayburn in the second season of Bloodline, at which point Teague was still going to high school. In 2016, he also had a part in the film Cell, based on a Stephen King book.

He was cast in Mary in 2017. Teague was being represented by APA, Management 360, Brevard Talent Group, and Myman Greenspan. Teague also appeared as Patrick Hockstetter in It (2017) and It Chapter Two (2019).

In 2017, he joined the crime thriller Inherit the Viper. He also joined the romance film Every Day, based on a novel by David Levithan.

He signed with CAA in 2018. Also that year, he was in the film Heft, as 17-year-old student Kel Keller dealing with baseball aspirations and family drama. In Mrs. Fletcher, a 2019 HBO series, he played Julian, a "19-year-old enamored with a 46-year-old divorcée named Eve", and played Alec in the thriller I See You (2019).

In August 2020, it was announced he would be playing Tommy Stinson in a Replacements biopic, Trouble Boys. He was cast as the character Harold Lauder in the 2020 CBS miniseries The Stand. According to Teague, The Stand had been a favorite book of his since the age of 13. He noted he tried to draw directly from Lauder's psychology in The Stand novel. As Harold Lauder, he plays a sociopathic teenager being tempted by evil during a pandemic. Consequence of Sound wrote that Teague plays Lauder with "nuanced perfection, capturing the insecurity, pomposity, and rage of one of the most dynamic characters in King's vast tapestry".

In August 2022, Teague was cast in the lead role in the film Kingdom of the Planet of the Apes, directed by Wes Ball for 20th Century Studios. The role earned him a nomination for Best Voice Over Performance at the 8th Astra Film Awards.

In May 2026, Teague was cast as Frank Bowers in the Amazon Prime Video television adaptation Life Is Strange, based on the 2015 video game.

== Filmography ==
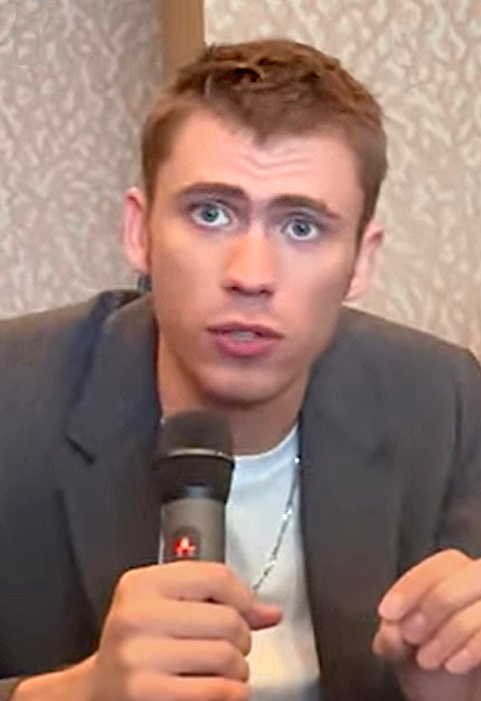
Owen Teague at the 2024 San Diego Comic-Con

=== Film ===
Key
†	Denotes films that have not yet been released

Year	Title	Role	Notes
2013	Contest	Bobby Butler	
2014	La Belle: the Ship That Changed History	Self	Documentary short
2015	Echoes of War	Samuel Riley	
2015	Walt Before Mickey	Young Walt	
2015	Wild in Blue	Young Charlie	
2016	Cell	Jordan	
2017	It	Patrick Hockstetter	
2018	Every Day	Alexander / A	
2019	I See You	Alec Travers	
2019	Inherit the Viper	Boots Conley	
2019	It Chapter Two	Patrick Hockstetter	
2019	Mary	Tommy	
2020	The Empty Man	Duncan West	
2021	Montana Story	Cal	
2022	Gone in the Night	Al Barlow	
2022	To Leslie	James	
2023	Eileen	Randy	
2023	You Hurt My Feelings	Elliot	
2023	Reptile	Rudy Rackozy	
2024	Kingdom of the Planet of the Apes	Noa	Motion-capture role
2024	Griffin in Summer	Brad Rizzo	
2024	The Friend	Carter	
2025	The Rivals of Amziah King	Pirate	
2026	The Whisper Man	Francis Carter Jr.	
2026	Evil Genius		
TBA	Gold Mountain †		Post-production

=== Television ===
Key
†	Denotes television productions that have not yet been released

Year	Title	Role	Notes
2012	Malibu Country	Jack	Episode: "Pilot"
2013	CollegeHumor Originals	Mitch	4 episodes
2013	NCIS: Los Angeles	Alex Fryman	Episode: "Purity"
2014	Reckless	Jacob	Episode: "Stand Your Ground"
2015	Bones	Jesse	Episode: "The Doom in the Boom"
2015–2017	Bloodline	Nolan Rayburn / Young Danny	Recurring role
2016	Mercy Street	Otis	Episode: "The New Nurse"
2017	Black Mirror	Trick	Episode: "Arkangel"
2019	Mrs. Fletcher	Julian Spitzer	Main role
2020–2021	The Stand	Harold Lauder	Main role
2025	Task	Kenny "Peaches" Pollard	Episode: "Crossings"
TBA	Life Is Strange †	Frank Bowers	Main role
TBA	The Murder of JonBenét Ramsey †	Jeff Shapiro	Upcoming series
