= Cell (novel) =

2006 novel by Stephen King

- First edition cover
- Author: Stephen King
- Cover artist: Mark Stutzman
- Language: English
- Genre: Horror
- Publisher: Scribner
- Publication date: February 1, 2006
- Publication place: United States
- Media type: Print (Hardcover and Paperback)
- Pages: 450
- ISBN: 978-0-7432-9233-7

Cell is a 2006 apocalyptic horror novel by American author Stephen King. The story follows a New England artist struggling to reunite with his young son after a mysterious signal broadcast over the global cell phone network turns the majority of his fellow humans into mindless vicious animals.

== Plot ==
Clayton Riddell, a struggling artist from Maine, lands a graphic novel deal in Boston when "The Pulse", a signal sent over the global cell phone network, turns cell phone users into zombie-like killers. Civilization crumbles as the "phoners" attack anyone in view.

Amidst the chaos, Clay is thrown together with middle-aged Thomas McCourt and fifteen-year-old Alice Maxwell; the trio escapes to Tom's suburban home as Boston burns. The next day, they forage for food and band together. Clay is determined to return to Maine and reunite with his son, Johnny. Tom and Alice reluctantly come with him. They trek north across a devastated New England, having fleeting encounters with other survivors and catching hints about the activities of the phoners, who attack non-phoners on sight.

Crossing into New Hampshire, they arrive at the Gaiten Academy, a prep school where only Headmaster Charles Ardai and pupil Jordan are unaffected. Every night, the local phoners pack themselves into the academy's soccer field and "switch off" until morning. They have become a hive mind and are developing psychic abilities. The five survivors destroy the flock using fire.

Clay tries to get everyone to flee, but the others refuse to abandon the elderly Ardai. That night, the survivors all have a vision of a disheveled male phoner wearing a Harvard hoodie, whom they dub "The Raggedy Man". The flock kills other non-phoners in reprisal and orders Clay's group to journey to a location in Maine called "Kashwak". The flock psychically compels Ardai to commit suicide. Clay and the others bury Ardai before departing.

En route, they learn that as "flock-killers", they have been psychically marked as untouchables, to be shunned by other non-phoners. Alice is murdered by a pair of non-phoners. In Clay's hometown of Kent Pond, they discover his estranged wife Sharon was turned into a phoner, but their son Johnny survived. Clay has another vision revealing that the non-phoner refugees were exposed to the Pulse. He remains intent on finding his son, but after meeting another group of flock-killers, Tom and Jordan decide to avoid the executions the phoners have planned. Before separating, the group discovers that Alice's killers were psychically compelled into suicide for touching an untouchable.

Clay sets off alone, but the others soon reappear. A flock-killer, construction worker Ray Huizenga, gives Clay a cell phone and a phone number, telling him to use them when the time is right; Ray then commits suicide. The group arrives at Kashwak, the site of a half-assembled county fair, where increasing numbers of phoners begin behaving erratically and break from the flock. Jordan theorizes that a computer program caused the Pulse and that, while it is still broadcasting into the cell phone network, it is corrupted with a worm that has infected the newer phoners with a mutated Pulse. Nevertheless, an army of phoners is waiting for them, and Sharon is among them. The phoners lock the group in the fair's exhibition hall for the night; the following morning their execution will be psychically broadcast across the world.

While awaiting their execution, Clay realizes Ray filled the group's bus with explosives and killed himself to prevent the flock from telepathically discovering them. Jordan drives the vehicle into the inert phoners. Thanks to a jury-rigged cell phone patch set up by the pre-Pulse fair workers, Clay detonates the bomb, wiping out the Raggedy Man and his flock.

The majority of the group heads into Canada, to let the approaching winter wipe out the region's unprotected and leaderless phoners. Clay heads south, seeking his son. He finds Johnny, who received a "corrupted" Pulse; he wandered away from Kashwak and seems to almost recognize his father. Clay decides to give Johnny another blast from the Pulse, hoping the increasingly corrupted signal will cancel itself out and reset his son's brain. The book ends with Clay dialing and placing the cell phone to Johnny's ear.

== Characters ==
- Clayton Riddell: a graphic artist separated from his family in Boston as the Pulse destroys civilization. Clay heads north with a group of survivors and tries to find his son, Johnny, and estranged wife, Sharon.
- Thomas McCourt: a middle-aged man from Malden; Tom teams up with Clay in the initial chaos created by the Pulse. With Clay and Alice, he travels to his home in Malden. Then, they move on north where they meet others. He remains with the group until after Kashwak, when he survives and leaves Clay along with Jordan, Denise and Dan.
- Alice Maxwell: a 15-year-old girl; Alice teams up with Clay and Tom to head north. She forces her anxiety and trauma into an abandoned child's Nike shoe which helps her cope with the atrocities committed by the phoners. Alice remains an important part of the group who continue to take inspiration from her even after her death.
- Jordan: a 12-year-old-boy studying at Gaiten Academy, a prep school that was devastated by the Pulse; Jordan faithfully remains with the headmaster, Charles Ardai, until they destroy the flock at the school and Ardai is driven to suicide by the phoners. Jordan remains with Clay's group and provides the intellectual theory and comparison of the effects of the Pulse to that of a worm in a computer.
- Charles Ardai: the headmaster of Jordan's prep school; Ardai is a father figure to Jordan and cares for the group. They manage to destroy a flock of phoners, but then Ardai is telepathically forced to commit suicide.
- Dan Hartwick: a survivor and head of another flock-killing group; a former professor, Dan is intelligent and joins Clay's group as they head to Kashwak. He ultimately survives and leaves Clay with Jordan, Denise and Tom.
- Denise Link: a pregnant survivor and part of Dan's flock-killing group; Denise joins the group with Dan and Ray and ultimately survives with them. She is described by Clay as a strong-willed woman and leaves with Tom, Jordan and Dan after Kashwak.
- Ray Huizenga: a construction worker who specialized in explosives; Ray was part of Dan's group of flock-killers along with Denise, but has a plan regarding Kashwak. He gives Clay vague instructions about the plan before committing suicide with a pistol in order to mask his plans from the phoners. This ultimately saves the entire group.
- The Raggedy Man/President of Harvard: the main antagonist of the book; he wears a torn red Harvard hoodie. He is killed by the bomb at Kashwak.
- "Pixie Light": a teenage girl spotted by Clay in Boston and dubbed Pixie Light because of her haircut and hair color, this girl was one of the first victims of the Pulse and attacked another phoner seconds after listening to the Pulse on her cell phone. Pixie Light tore out the phoner's neck with her teeth and was knocked unconscious by Clay before she could do any more harm and was left on the streets of Boston.
- "Pixie Dark": a teenage girl spotted by Clay in Boston who was named for reasons similar to Pixie Light; Pixie Dark was Pixie Light's friend and only heard a small dose of the Pulse via Pixie Light's cell phone. Instead of going completely crazy like her friend, Pixie Dark's brain was erased by the Pulse and she lost her mind, running off into Boston shouting "Who am I?" over and over. She is referenced several times throughout the book by Clay.
- Gunner and Harold: a pair of young men encountered by Clay's group not long after they depart Gaiten; mouthy and rude (particularly toward Alice), they believe that Kashwak will be a safe haven for "normies". Following their brutal reciprocation to a threat made to them by Clay, Gunner and Harold are summarily punished for daring to touch an untouchable.
- Other minor characters are briefly mentioned or seen throughout the book, primarily either as "normies" ("Plump Bible-toting Lady", Roscoe Handt) or phoners ("Power Suit Woman", Judy Scottoni).

== eBay auction ==
A role in the story was offered to the winner of a charity auction for the First Amendment Project, sponsored by eBay:

One (and only one) character name in a novel called CELL, which is now in work and which will appear in either 2007 or 2008. Buyer should be aware that CELL is a violent piece of work, which comes complete with zombies set in motion by bad cell phone signals that destroy the brain. Like cheap whiskey, it's very nasty and extremely satisfying. Character can be male or female, but a buyer who wants to die must in this case be female. In any case, I'll require physical description of auction winner, including any nickname (can be made up, I don't give a rip).

Other authors like Peter Straub also participated in the online auction, selling roles in their upcoming books. The King auction ran between September 8 and 18, 2005 and the winner, a Ft. Lauderdale woman named Pam Alexander, paid $25,100 (equivalent to $33,000 in 2025). Ms. Alexander gave the honor as a gift to her brother Ray Huizenga; his name was given to one of the zombie-slaughtering "flock-killers" in the story, a construction worker who specializes in explosives, but then later commits suicide in order to aid the "flock-killers" escape.

== Reception ==
The book generally received positive reviews from critics. Publishers Weekly described it as "a glib, technophobic but compelling look at the end of civilization" and full of "jaunty and witty" sociological observations. Stephen King scholar Bev Vincent said "It's a dark, gritty, pessimistic novel in many ways and stands in stark contrast to the fundamental optimism of The Stand".

== Film adaptation ==
In 2006, Ain't It Cool News announced that Dimension Films had bought the film rights to the book and would produce a film to be directed by Eli Roth for a 2009 release. Roth, a fan of the novel, said he wanted to do a Roland Emmerich-style film that shows the worldwide collapse of civilization and its immediate aftermath, something that most zombie films did not show.

In June 2007, Eli Roth said he would not be directing Cell "anytime soon", as he planned to spend the rest of the year writing other projects. In July 2009, he dropped out of the project after creative differences with the studio and said he preferred to direct his own scripts. In November 2009, Stephen King announced at a book signing in Maryland that he had finished a screenplay. He stated that he had complaints with the ending of the book and it was redone for the screenplay.

John Cusack was cast as Clayton Riddell in October 2012. In November 2013, Samuel L. Jackson signed on to play Tom McCourt. Both actors previously starred in 1408, a 2007 film adaption of Stephen King's short story of the same name. Cell was released on June 10, 2016, to video on demand, prior to a limited release scheduled for July 8, 2016.
