= The Clockwork Rocket =

2011 novel by Greg Egan

- First edition cover
- Author: Greg Egan
- Publisher: Gollancz
- Publication date: 2011
- ISBN: 9780575095113
- OCLC: 861262004

The Clockwork Rocket is a hard science-fiction novel by Australian author Greg Egan and the first part of the Orthogonal trilogy. The novel was published by Night Shade Books on 1 July 2011 with a cover art by Cody Tilson and by Gollancz on 15 September 2011 with a cover art by Greg Egan.

The novel describes an alien civilization being threatened by the appearance of hurtling meteors (which experience a totally different direction as time) entering their planetary system with an unprecedented speed and the implementation of an unusual plan: All the technology needed for an effective defense shall be developed on board of a generation ship launched into the void while only a few years pass back on the home world in the meantime due to time dilation. This is possible due to different laws for space and time in this universe, in which they have the same signature instead of different ones (meaning the sign of the signature for time is inverted), or which is alternatively described by a Riemannian instead of a Lorentzian manifold.

The consequences on some of the physical concepts needed in the novel including time dilation and radiation, are described by Greg Egan with diagrams in the novel and also his website. The story is continued in The Eternal Flame and The Arrows of Time.

== Plot ==
When Yalda is three years old, she accompanies her grandfather Dario into the forest to convalesce, but he instead passes away. The following spring, she sees a shooting star in the sky. When Yalda is twelve years old, she joins school and learns about the basic laws of physics, including those of light, leading her to realize that space and time are exactly the same. The following summer, she observes multiple shooting stars hurtling across the sky. When Yalda has reached adulthood and embarked a career as a physicist, she begins to study light and in particular the strange phenomenon now known as the Hurtlers, which all enter the planetary system from the same spatial direction, but at different times. Yalda theorizes, that the roles are reversed for the Hurtlers, meaning for them an entire cluster spread over space arrives at the same time, hence the direction of time of this cluster and their own are orthogonal to each other. Now their home world is threatened by the arrival of the Hurtlers and might face complete destruction by an impending collision.

An unusual reaction to this crisis is brought up by Eusebio, a student of Yalda. Developing the technology necessary will take too much time, therefore a generation ship must be sent into the void to exploit relativistic effects to find the time elsewhere. While accelerating, deaccelerating as well as turning the ship around, time will pass on the home world. But the journey aligned with the orthogonal cluster and the velocity of the Hurtlers and as long as needed will be witnessed as being along a purely spatial dimension from the home world, hence in an orthogonal direction. Yalda remarks that the largest rockets build yet have a lot smaller size. Eusebio had taken this into account: Since the nearby Mount Peerless is made out of very hard sunstone, it can be turned into the rocket needed. The plan then includes blasting the whole mountain into the sky.

Eusebio conducts the first experiments of sending sunstone off their world on Mount Peerless and finally succeeds by launching a piece into orbit around their sun. Yalda receives a letter of her sister Lucia meanwhile, in which she informs her of changes on the farm and her decision of becoming a mother, resulting in the end of her own life due to their way of reproduction. Yalda and Eusebio travel around different cities to gather endorsement for their plan. Yalda meets Benedetta, with whom she has a conversation about that the course of the rocket points into its own past, which allows for the conclusion of determinism in their universe. The question arises, if their already predetermined actions are then even relevant at all. Yalda can convince Benedetta, who then decides to be the first passenger. At night, Yalda and Eusebio witness the destruction of the twin planets Gemma and Gemmo in their own system by one of the Hurtlers. This catastrophic event causes massive endorsement for their plan and the preparation of Mount Peerless begins.

Five years later, the work is almost done, but the Peerless still lacks a proper crew due to safety concerns or the restricted quality of life on board. Even for many working on the rocket, just waiting for four years on the home world for its return with incredibly advanced technology is the preferred option. Benedetta has send out space probes, which have examined the Hurtlers and determined their direction of time, which turns out to not be perfectly orthogonal to that of their home world. Luckily, the Peerless will first travel into the future of the orthogonal cluster, pushing certain problems with causality to the return journey into its past. Benedetta then plans to test a rocket made out of sunstone herself to persuade the workers of its safety, but instead dies pointlessly during the test. Eusebio tells Yalda, that he won't join the journey and stay behind on the home world to fight for launching another generation ship in case the Peerless will fail and won't return in four years.

After the Peerless has been launched and entered the orthogonal cluster, the crew encounters the first major problem: Their crops seem to rely on gravity to grow, which is no longer present after the acceleration phase. Constructions begin on getting the mountain to spin to generate artificial gravity and making the crops grow again. In the meantime, Yalda and the other females on board begin to slowly use up their stocks of Holin, a drug to halt spontaneous reproduction with more being needed with older age. Yalda needs multiple the amount than younger females, which makes her reflect on her role in the journey and that she may have had the illusion to experience its return. Yalda realizes that the journey is now about the next generation, whom she has already taught everything she knew during the acceleration phase, so she and the other older females make their conscious decision for reproduction. Yalda hands over the command of the Peerless and then mates with Nino, who was imprisoned for engaging in espionage during the construction of the Peerless. In her final moments, she thinks about the life of her children lying ahead.

== Background (literature) ==
Due to Greg Egan being very popular in Japan, the novel was released by Hayakawa Publishing in Japanese as クロックワーク・ロケット (kurokkuwāku roketto, direct transcription of the original English title into Katakana) in 2015. The translation was done by Makoto Yamagishi (山岸真) and Toru Nakamura (中村融).

The novel was a Locus Award Nominee for Best SF Novel in 2012 and reached the 13th place. It was also a Goodreads Choice Award Nominee for Science Fiction in 2011.

Parallel to the main plot device of Riemannian geometry, Greg Egan also pays a lot of attention on adapting and mirroring well-known debates and conflicts from human society in his alien society, which includes social norms, traditions, prejudice and injustice as well as gender roles and feminism: The aliens in the novel are able to shapeshift (for example extrude new limbs). They reproduce with a male and a female connecting their bodies together and the male transmitting a light signal to the female, causing her to split into two pairs of children and hence her own death (meaning in particular, that committing rape is the same as committing murder). The male is then left to raise the two pairs of children alone. In such a pair, one child is male and one is female. Both are called the "co" of the respective other and they bear similar names, the only difference being the male name ending with "o" and the female name ending with "a". Traditionally, a female is expected to reproduce with her male co, but doesn't have to. Rarely, a child (like Yalda) without a co is born (for example due to absorbing it during birth) and called a "solo", who are seen as weird and treated as outcasts. Due to females giving birth by splitting into four children, they are larger than males and hence do most of the handwork. They are also not seen as owning their own bodies by most of society and not seeking to found a family (like Yalda) is labelled as inappropriate.

== Background (mathematics) ==
The consequences of the sign change in the metric on the laws of physics are explained in detail (with illustrations and calculations) on Greg Egan's website. The correspondence of the principles presented in the novel with those in our universe are explained in the afterword of the novel.

== Reception ==
David Brin, Hugo and Nebula Award-winning author of Earth and Existence, claims that "Greg Egan is a master of 'what-if' science fiction". His "characters work out the implications and outcomes as they struggle to survive and prevail" and he presents "the most original alien race since Vernor Vinge's Tines".

Jerry Oltion, Nebula Award-winning author of Abandon in Place, claims that "when most people switch a minus sign for a plus, they re-do the math. Egan re-does the entire universe."

Stefan Raets writes on tor.com, that Greg Egan "does great things" like "extrapolating an entire society" with "very alien alien[s]". He claims that the "novel is probably the hardest hard science fiction novel I’ve ever read" as Greg Egan "creates some real, old-fashioned sensawunda".

Karen Burnham, writing in the New York Review of Science Fiction, says "the consequences of this "minor" change rebound fantastically throughout the world building." In a review of the sequel The Arrows of Time, she adds that "in order to get there, we tour through a huge amount of speculative world building, physics, biology, and sociology."

Michael Levy, writing in Strange Horizons, says that "in some ways Egan's method is reminiscent of the clumsy infodumps found in science fiction of the Gernsback era, but there's a key difference here. Unlike the typical Gernsback-era writer, Egan knows exactly what he's doing." Concerning the construction of the rocket, the novel has "a great deal of attention paid to more visceral matters", and concerning the physics, it is "decidedly heavy and the dozens of diagrams and equations will be off-putting to some readers, but others, I'm sure, will find them endlessly engaging."

A French review by Éric Jentile was published in print in Bifrost, #88 in October 2017.
