= Alex ter Avest =

American actress (born 1993)

- Born: February 15, 1993 (age 33); Chapel Hill, North Carolina, U.S.
- Other name: Alexandria Lauren ter Avest
- Occupation: Actress

Alexandria Lauren ter Avest or Alex ter Avest (born February 15, 1993) is an American actress.

== Early life ==
Avest was born in Chapel Hill, North Carolina. She attended Cary Academy. She then attended the University of North Carolina School of the Arts where she studied drama. After high school, she attended the University of North Carolina at Chapel Hill on a fellowship. She is married to former professional hockey player Jared Knight.

== Career ==
Avest started her acting career in local theater. In 2003, Avest played Alice in the stage production of Alice in Wonderland at the Applause! Cary Youth Theater in Cary, North Carolina. In 2010, she played Janice in the Raleigh Ensemble Players' production of The Effect of Gamma Rays on Man-in-the-Moon Marigolds.

In 2016 she appeared in the film Cell which was based on a book by Stephen King.

== Filmography ==
=== Television ===
Year	Title	Role	Notes	Reference
2009	One Tree Hill	Audition Girl	one episode appearance	
2012	Eastbound and Down	Andrea	HBO series, Season 3, five episodes.	
2014	StarCrossed	Lesley	one episode appearance	
2017	Ozark	Leah	one episode appearance	

=== Film ===
Year	Title	Role	Notes	Reference
2012	Stuck in Love	Becky		
2015	Careful What You Wish For	Emma Shalloway	uncredited	
2015	Changeover	Sooze		
2016	Cell	Chloe	Based on Stephen King book	
2017	Logan Lucky	Pre-Show Publicist		
