= Gramma (The Twilight Zone) =

- The Twilight Zone segment
- Scene from "Gramma"
- Episode no.: Season 1 Episode 18a
- Directed by: Bradford May
- Written by: Harlan Ellison
- Based on: "Gramma" by Stephen King
- Original air date: 14 February 1986

Guest appearances
- Barret Oliver as Georgie; Darlanne Fluegel as Mother; Frederick Long as Gramma (body); Piper Laurie as Gramma (voice)

Episode chronology
← Previous "Quarantine"	Next → "Personal Demons"

"Gramma" is the first segment of the eighteenth episode of the first season of the television series The Twilight Zone. This segment, about a boy who is afraid of his grandmother, is based on the short story of the same name by Stephen King, published in the collection Skeleton Crew (1985).

== Plot ==
Eleven-year-old George is left alone with his infirm grandmother, while his mother leaves to visit George's brother in the hospital. George's mother is concerned since George is frightened of "Gramma", but George insists he has grown out of his fear.

Gramma asks George for tea. As George brings tea, he recalls how his mother and her siblings discussed how dangerous Gramma is now that she is senile. Her hand reaches out from the bedclothes. This startles George, and he drops the tea tray and flees the room.

Regaining his composure, George returns to clean up the mess. He opens a panel in the floor. He takes two books from the concealed hole and runs out with them. One of the books is the Necronomicon, while the other is a diary which discusses witchcraft and summoning the dead. He realizes Gramma is a witch.

George returns to Gramma's room and tries without success to rouse her. He finds she has no pulse. Thinking she is dead, he runs to the phone to call the hospital, but the line is tied up. He returns to her room to cover up her face. Gramma reaches out and grabs him, and they seem to merge into one being.

George's mother returns and finds George sitting at the kitchen table with his grandmother's books. He explains that Gramma died and he was scared. She comforts him, saying that Gramma will still always be with them. George now has glowing red eyes like Gramma.

== Production ==
The Twilight Zone's staff writers were unhappy when they were told that CBS had acquired the television rights for Stephen King's "Gramma", feeling that it would be almost impossible to adapt, since it consists mostly of internal monologues. Faced with the choice of producing a segment from it or swallowing the considerable cost of licensing a Stephen King property, they turned the unenviable task of writing the teleplay over to story consultant Harlan Ellison.

William Friedkin, who had previously directed the segment "Nightcrawlers", was originally slated to direct "Gramma", and in fact had cast all the characters and fully prepped the set when a familial obligation forced him to drop the job. Bradford May, The Twilight Zone's director of photography, had long held aspirations of being a director and stepped in as Friedkin's last-minute replacement. The segment was shot on sets at the CBS Radford.

When George opens up the floor panel in Gramma's bedroom, the sounds which emerge are a collage of bacon frying, cicadas singing, and Harlan Ellison making raspy vocalizations. Ellison also provided one of the voices of George's family, while Piper Laurie voiced Gramma.

== Reception ==
Gilbert Cruz ranked "Gramma" at number 9 out of 27 in a list of Stephen King television adaptations on Vulture. Cruz remarked that Harlan Ellison's script does an astoundingly good job of making the uneventful story work for television and bringing out its emotional and metaphorical heart.
