= Matt Greenberg =

American screenwriter and producer

Matt Greenberg is an American screenwriter and producer.

== Filmography ==
Year	Title	Writer	Producer	Notes
1993	Ghost Brigade	Yes	No	
1997	The Big Brass Ring	Adaption	No	Short film
1998	The Prophecy II	Yes	Associate	
1998	Halloween H20: 20 Years Later	Yes	No	
2000	The Crow: Salvation	No	Co-producer	
2000	The Invisible Man	Yes	Co-producer	Episode "Pilot"
2002	Reign of Fire	Yes	No	
2007	1408	Yes	No	
2014	Mercy	Yes	Executive	
2014	Seventh Son	Story	No	
2019	Pet Sematary	Story	No	

Uncredited revisions

- Children of the Corn III: Urban Harvest (1995)
- Mimic (1997)
