= The Arrows of Time =

2013 novel by Greg Egan

- Author: Greg Egan
- Publisher: Gollancz
- Publication date: 2013
- ISBN: 9780575105768
- OCLC: 858310606

The Arrows of Time is a hard science-fiction novel by Australian author Greg Egan and the third part of the Orthogonal trilogy. The novel was published by Gollancz on 21 November 2013 with a cover art by Greg Egan and by Night Shade Books on 5 August 2014 with a cover art by Cody Tilson. The novel describes the return journey of the generation ship Peerless, which has been launched in The Clockwork Rocket and traveled into the void in The Eternal Flame, and the reverse enabling the construction of a device to receive messages from the own future as well as the journey to a world where time runs in reverse. The universe of the novel is therefore based on a Riemannian instead of a Lorentzian manifold (which describes our own universe, where time only flows in one direction or the corresponding region being hidden behind an event horizon otherwise), changing the rules of physics. The details are described by Greg Egan on his website.

== Plot ==
Valeria watches the launch of the Peerless from the home world, waiting for its return. Six generations later, a suitable time has come to turn the ship around. A solution for the home world is in sight. But the crew is split into two fractions, one wanting to continue the mission and one instead wanting to find a new home in the orthogonal cluster. After a vote is held, the Peerless turns around and (with an inverted arrow of time) begins the long voyage home. Agata talks with Medoro about the new possibility of using the inverted light of orthogonal stars to send messages back in time, but a discussion only parts the Peerless further. After a vote in favor of the system, a bomb kills the group responsible for its construction, including Medoro. Some strongly against it like Ramiro are imprisoned. Meanwhile, the discovery of an inhabitable world called Esilio in the orthogonal cluster seems to pose a solution to the conflict, but time is running backward there. A journey to Esilio is planned. Examining light bent by the gravity of its sun could also verify Lila's theory (corresponding to General relativity).

Agata, Ramiro, Tarquinia and Azelio fly to Esilio with the Surveyor using an orthogonal course just like the Peerless. Twelve years will pass for them while only four years will pass on board the Peerless. After reaching Esilio, Lila's theory is confirmed. On the surface, they have to deal with many odd consequences of the opposite arrow of time, including having to detonate a rock to enforce their own onto the soil to make their plants grow. Agata finds a message carved into a stone in the crater, which is from the ancestors giving them their gratitude from when Esilio flew past the home world. They fly back with the knowledge of the ultimate success of the grand mission of the Peerless.

When approaching the Peerless, they learn of the successful construction of the messaging system. Everything about their journey is already common knowledge. Contrary to expectation, the system has blocked any new innovation. But it will completely shut down in a while with no hint at a reason sent back before. The crew discusses about a manual shutdown or manipulation being better than a complete destruction of the Peerless by a collision (if it could be averted at all) and build probes to obstruct the orthogonal stars in front of the cameras. After their arrival back on board, they learn about the still ongoing division of society with some thinking the shutdown will be a trick. Agata and Ramiro both learn of a plan to destroy the cameras (which use light from the entire orthogonal cluster, rendering bare obstruction impossible) by detonations from space by Giacomo, who used the messaging system he despises nonetheless to plan ahead knowing about the probes of the Surveyor and Agata's condition (whose future self still doesn't agree to the current plan) to even abandon it in the last moment if she finds a less dangerous solution. Ramiro admits to Agata to have send Tarquinia to carve the message on Esilio, which therefore isn't from the ancestors and doesn't guarantee a safe future. Shortly before the disruption, Agata realizes that flooding the cameras with ordinary light can also cause a signal loss and heads out into space to move the bombs. The disruption takes place with only minor destruction and Agata survives injured. Tarquinia admits to Agata and Ramiro that she just couldn't uncarve the message on Esilio, which therefore was in fact from the ancestors. Agata tells them about the destruction of the messaging system having lifted the block on innovation with the recent one explaining how their entire existence is even possible.

One year after the departure of the Peerless from the home world, Valeria is woken up by screams as the sun has turned dark. Together with Eusebio and Silvio, she is brought to Clara, a traveler from the Peerless taking them into space. The Peerless flew another loop to arrive three years earlier (and also passed by itself on its former course). The sun (which in this universe is a burning rock) was extinguished and gigantic thrusters based on the eternal flame are now built on it to accelerate the entire system (through gravity) onto a parallel course with the Hurtlers, rendering them harmless. The destroyed Gemma will continue to provide light. Clara also shares insight into their society where males and females have been fused together and which prefers to stay on the Peerless and the far side of the sun. Valeria plans to come for a visit, but is saddened by the fact that she wouldn't be able to express her gratitude for past generations. Clara thinks that there will surely be a way.

== Background (literature) ==
Due to Greg Egan being very popular in Japan, the novel was released by Hayakawa Publishing in Japanese as アロウズ・オブ・タイム (arōzu obu taimu, direct transcription of the original English title into Katakana) in 2017. The translation was done by Makoto Yamagishi (山岸真) and Toru Nakamura (中村融).

The novel was a Locus Award Nominee for Best SF Novel in 2014 and reached the 14th place.

The messaging system also appears in the short story The Hundred Light-Year Diary by Greg Egan published in 1992, where a time-reversed galaxy from the future phase of contraction of the universe (a theory known as Big Crunch) is discovered. Both stories deal with free will and the consequences of knowing ahead. In particular for The Arrows of Time, the main mission of scientific research would still be necessary nonetheless since otherwise a result would be sent back in time just because it already had been received without there ever being proof for it.

== Background (mathematics and physics) ==
The consequences of the sign change in the metric on the laws of physics are explained in detail (with illustrations and calculations) on Greg Egan's website. The correspondence of the principles presented in the novel with those in our universe are explained in the afterword of the novel.

The novel adapts one of the most famous experiments in physics, which is the verification of General Relativity through deflection of light by the sun during the Solar eclipse of May 29, 1919 known as Eddington experiment. While in our universe, Newton's theory predicts light (if it had rest mass, which is not actually the case) to be bent half compared Einstein's theory, in the Orthogonal universe, the roles are reversed and Vittorio's theory corresponding to the former predicts light (which in this case does indeed have a rest mass) to be bent more than in Lila's theory corresponding to the latter. Calculations and illustrations of this effect are shown on Greg Egan's website.

The Dirac equation provides two important concepts for the novel. As it is constructed as a square root of the Klein–Gordon equation (a relativistic generalization of the Schrödinger equation), the energies of its solutions are affected by the same problem as the square roots of positive numbers, which is the ambiguity of the sign. This led to the theoretical discovery of antimatter in 1928 before the first observation of a positron (the antiparticle of the electron) in 1932. But as negative energy poses certain problems in further calculations, the negative sign is often shifted to time using the uncertainty principle of energy and time. This interpretation in quantum field theory of antimatter traveling backward through time is known as the Feynman–Stückelberg interpretation. In the novel, matter and antimatter particles are called "negative" and "positive luxagens" as a result. Ordinary matter and antimatter colliding results in their total annihilation, which happened with the Object in the prequel The Eternal Flame. It doesn't happen with matter of the orthogonal cluster any more as the Peerless has turned around and hence inverted its own arrow of time. The problem that is now the opposite to that of Esilio and hence it should actually be the other way around is explained in the novel by distinguishing between the actual arrow of time and the arrow of entropy decrease, which are opposite to each other for the orthogonal cluster (hence entropy increases, violating the second law of thermodynamics). The Dirac equation furthermore describes particles with spin $1/2$, including electrons. It is based on the metric of spacetime and therefore different in the Orthogonal universe as explained in the prequel The Eternal Flame and on Greg Egan's website. As a result, electrons don't exist any more and neither does electronics, which uses them in form of electric currents to transmit information. In the novel, an alternative technology called photonics is used, where photons are used instead, and which also exists in our universe in the form of optical fibers for example. (Although different, as photons don't have a rest mass in our universe, but have in the Orthogonal universe.)

== Reception ==
Karen Burnham, writing in the New York Review of Science Fiction, says "the scenes of them dealing with the counter-intuitive behavior of the time-reversed planet are appropriately mind-bending". She finds that "ultimately, the plot of the trilogy is always about physics and the concerns over free will and its limitations; it is never about the threat that the Hurtlers posed to the homeworld." She also thinks that "it is a fair criticism that some of the physics dialogues in the trilogy are dry, and if the reader doesn't have a solid grounding in the physics of our own universe, it can be a challenge".

Andy Sawyer, writing in Strange Horizons, says the novel is "an intellectual quest which involves us, the readers" and "it is as valid an apothesis as anything which involves the physical or the spiritual, made rarer because it celebrates curiosity, knowledge, and understanding." He writes about the diagrams in the novel, which many readers "now find alienating", that they make Egan "a rewarding writer rather than a simply difficult one". The scientific discoveries bring "joy involved with really good hard SF: the conceptual breakthrough and the collision with the sublime".

Other reviews have been published in Interzone, #251 in March/April 2014 by John Howard and Analog Science Fiction and Fact in January/February 2015 by Don Sakers. A French review by Éric Jentile was published in print in Bifrost, #88 in October 2017.

== See also ==
- Novikov self-consistency principle, principle used in the novel to avoid temporal paradoxa
- One-electron universe, hypothesis derived from the Feynman–Stückelberg interpretation
- What's Expected of Us, short story by Ted Chiang about the psychological consequences
- Tenet, movie by Christopher Nolan about reversing the flow of time
