= Inherit the Viper =

2019 American film by Anthony Jerjen

- Film poster
- Directed by: Anthony Jerjen
- Written by: Andrew Crabtree
- Produced by: Michel Merkt; Benito Mueller
- Starring: Josh Hartnett; Margarita Levieva; Chandler Riggs; Bruce Dern; Valorie Curry; Owen Teague; Dash Mihok
- Cinematography: Nicholas Wiesnet
- Edited by: Gordon Antell; Kiran Pallegadda
- Production companies: Barry Films; Tycor International Film Company
- Distributed by: Lionsgate
- Release dates: September 28, 2019 (Zurich Film Festival); January 10, 2020 (United States)
- Running time: 84 minutes
- Country: United States
- Language: English

Inherit the Viper is a 2019 American crime drama film directed by Anthony Jerjen, in his feature directorial debut, from a screenplay by Andrew Crabtree. It stars Josh Hartnett, Margarita Levieva, Chandler Riggs, Bruce Dern, Valorie Curry, Owen Teague and Dash Mihok.

Inherit the Viper had its world premiere at the 2019 Zurich Film Festival, and was released in a limited theatrical engagement before premiering on video-on-demand on January 10, 2020, by Lionsgate.

== Plot ==
For siblings Kip and Josie, dealing opioids is not just their family business, it is their only means of survival. When a deal goes fatally wrong, Kip decides he wants out for good. But his attempt to escape his family's legacy soon ignites a powder keg of violence and betrayal, endangering Kip, Josie and their younger brother.

== Cast ==
- Josh Hartnett as Kip Conley
- Margarita Levieva as Josie Conley
- Chandler Riggs as Cooper
- Bruce Dern as Clay Carter
- Valorie Curry as Eve
- Owen Teague as Boots Conley
- Artrial Clark as Boots' Friend
- Dash Mihok as Kyle Knox
- Brad William Henke as Tedd Wallace
- Jared Bankens as Marcus
- Blaine Kern III as Ryan
- Tara Buck as Eliza
- G-Rod as Duane
- Garrett Kruithof as Packard
- Tilcia Furman as Duane's Girlfriend at baby reveal

== Production ==
In November 2017, it was announced Josh Hartnett and Margarita Levieva joined the cast of the film, with Anthony Jerjen directing from a screenplay written by Anthony Crabtree. While Michel Merkt and Benito Mueller produced the film, Wolfgang Mueller served as an executive producer under their Barry Films banner. In December 2017, Bruce Dern, Owen Teague, Valorie Curry, Chandler Riggs and Dash Mihok joined the cast of the film.

Principal photography began in December 2017.

== Reception ==
On review aggregator website Rotten Tomatoes, the film holds an approval rating of 45% based on 20 reviews, with an average rating of 5.3/10.
