= 1408 (film) =

2007 psychological horror film directed by Mikael Håfström

- Theatrical release poster
- Directed by: Mikael Håfström
- Screenplay by: Matt Greenberg; Scott Alexander Larry Karaszewski
- Based on: "1408" by Stephen King
- Produced by: Lorenzo di Bonaventura
- Starring: John Cusack; Samuel L. Jackson; Mary McCormack; Tony Shalhoub
- Cinematography: Benoît Delhomme
- Edited by: Peter Boyle
- Music by: Gabriel Yared
- Production companies: Dimension Films; Di Bonaventura Pictures
- Distributed by: The Weinstein Company; Metro-Goldwyn-Mayer
- Release date: June 22, 2007
- Running time: 104 minutes
- Country: United States
- Language: English
- Budget: $25 million
- Box office: $133 million

1408 is a 2007 American supernatural psychological horror film based on Stephen King's short story published in 1999. It was directed by Mikael Håfström, written by Matt Greenberg, Scott Alexander and Larry Karaszewski, and stars John Cusack and Samuel L. Jackson.

The film follows Mike Enslin, an author who investigates allegedly haunted places. Enslin receives an ominous warning not to enter room 1408 at a New York City hotel, The Dolphin. Although skeptical of the paranormal, he is soon trapped in the room, where he experiences bizarre and frightful events.

1408 was released in the United States on June 22, 2007, by Metro-Goldwyn-Mayer (under The Weinstein Company). The film received generally positive reviews from critics and was a box-office success, grossing $133 million against a production budget of $25 million.

As of November 2026, a sequel is in development with Cusack and Jackson reprising their roles.

== Plot ==
Mike Enslin is a cynical and skeptical author of niche books about supernatural events, in which he has no belief. While promoting his latest book in Hermosa Beach, California, he receives an anonymous postcard depicting The Dolphin, a hotel on Lexington Avenue in New York City, bearing the message: "Don't enter 1408." Viewing this as a challenge, Mike travels to The Dolphin and requests room 1408. The hotel manager, Gerald Olin, attempts to discourage him. He explains to Mike that in the last 95 years, no one has lasted more than an hour inside of 1408; the latest count is 56 deaths. Olin repeatedly and impassionately attempts to dissuade and bribe Mike, but at Mike's insistence and threat of legal action against the hotel, preparations are reluctantly made.

While Mike describes the room's ordinary appearance and absence of supernatural behavior on his mini-cassette recorder as the "banality of evil", the clock radio suddenly starts playing "We've Only Just Begun", and the digital display changes to a countdown starting from 60:00. Mike begins to see ghosts of the room's past victims, along with flashbacks of his deceased daughter Katie and his terminally ill father. Mike makes numerous attempts to leave the room, all in vain. Mike uses his laptop to contact his estranged wife Lily and ask for help. The room activates the sprinkler system, short-circuiting the laptop, which starts to work again when the temperature drops below zero. A doppelgänger of Mike appears in a video chat window, urging Lily to come to the hotel room.

The room starts to shake violently, causing Mike to crash into a picture of a ship in a storm, from which water floods the room. He finds himself reliving a surfing accident from before he entered the room. Recovering in the hospital, he reconciles with Lily and assumes his experience in 1408 was just a nightmare; Lily encourages him to write a book about it. When visiting the post office to send the manuscript to his publisher, he recognizes members of a construction crew as Dolphin Hotel staff, who start destroying the walls, revealing that Mike is still trapped inside 1408. Katie's ghost confronts him, and when the countdown ends, the room restores itself and the clock radio resets to 60:00.

A voice that sounds like a female hotel operator calls Mike on the room phone. Mike asks why he has not been killed and she informs him that guests enjoy free will: he can either relive the past hour over and over again, or use their "express checkout system". A hangman's noose appears, but he refuses to give in. The voice calls once again, threatening that even if he escapes, he will never leave. Mike tells them to not send his wife to the room, hanging up as the phone begins to melt. Mike improvises a Molotov cocktail and sets the room on fire. He then lies down and laughs in victory upon destroying the room.

=== Endings ===
There are four endings to the movie; a theatrical ending, and three separate home release endings including a director's cut.

In the theatrical ending, Mike is rescued from the room by firefighters and he reconciles with Lily, though she is skeptical of his experience. She finds a box of Mike's possessions that were rescued from 1408 and Mike takes the damaged mini-cassette recorder from it. He briefly tampers with the recorder, making it work again. Suddenly, they both hear Katie's voice coming from it, confirming Mike's account.

In the alternate ("no proof") ending, Mike survives and reunites with Lily, but when the tape recorder plays, only Mike's voice is heard, leaving Lily skeptical about Mike's experience at the hotel.

In the original director's cut ending, Mike instead dies in the fire. After attending his funeral, Mike's publisher opens a letter from Mike containing a completed manuscript of his story of room 1408. He also finds and plays the tape recorder and hears both Mike and Katie talking.

In the final alternate ending, Mike again dies in the fire. Olin attends the funeral and attempts to hand Mike's possessions, including the tape recorder, to Lily, who rejects it, feeling the situation too overwhelming to handle. Olin returns to his car, where he plays the tape and hears Katie's voice before seeing her standing in the distance at the grave yard. He also sees a momentary phantom of Mike covered in burns in his rear view mirror, only to turn around and find him gone. The movie ends with Mike's ghost in the burnt room, much like one of the ghosts that he himself saw during his stay.

== Cast ==
- John Cusack as Mike Enslin
- Samuel L. Jackson as Gerald Olin
- Mary McCormack as Lily Enslin
- Tony Shalhoub as Sam Farrell
- Len Cariou as Mike's father
- Jasmine Jessica Anthony as Katie Enslin
- Isiah Whitlock Jr. as Hotel Engineer
- Kim Thomson as Hotel Desk Clerk
- Benny Urquidez as Claw Hammer Maniac
- Angel Oquendo as Taxi Cab Driver
- Andrew-Lee Potts as Mailbox Guy
- Jules de Jongh as the Female Front-Desk Voice on the Phone (uncredited)

== Production ==
=== Development ===
In November 2003 and 2004, Dimension Films optioned the rights to the 1999 short story "1408" by Stephen King. The studio hired Matt Greenberg to adapt the story into a screenplay. In October 2005, Mikael Håfström was hired to direct, with the screenplay being rewritten by Scott Alexander and Larry Karaszewski. In March 2006, John Cusack was cast to star in the film, joined by Samuel L. Jackson the following April. In July, Kate Walsh was cast to star opposite Cusack as the protagonist's ex-wife, but she was forced to exit in August due to scheduling conflicts with her role on Grey's Anatomy. She was replaced by Mary McCormack.

=== Filming ===
According to Cusack, the Roosevelt Hotel in New York was used for some of the exterior shots of the Dolphin. The lobby scenes were filmed at the Reform Club in London.

== Release ==
=== Endings ===
In addition to the ending that appears in the theatrical release, three other alternative endings were shot. In 2007, it was reported that director Mikael Håfström said the ending of the film was reshot because test audiences felt that the original was a "downer". However, in a 2024 interview, Håfström clarified that the theatrical ending was shot first and that alternate endings were shot later in a desire to "experiment". He also stated that he feels that the theatrical ending is "more rewarding" and "stronger, and much more emotional".

==== Alternate ending #1 ====
Mike dies in the fire. At Mike's funeral, Olin approaches Lily and Mike's publisher Sam Farrell. He unsuccessfully attempts to give her a box of Mike's possessions, including the tape recorder. Olin states that Mike did not die in vain, as the room was successfully destroyed. He later listens to the recording in his car and is saddened when he hears Katie's voice on the tape. He sees a little girl in a dress walking on the cemetery grass behind the car, calling out as if she is lost. He then sees Mike's burnt corpse in the backseat. Then he sees the same girl holding hands with her father as they walk away. Olin places the tape recorder back in the box and drives off. The final scene is of the gutted room, where an apparition of Mike assesses the death of the entity while smoking a cigarette. He hears his daughter calling for him and disappears as he walks toward the door. A door is heard closing and the scene fades.

==== Alternate ending #2 ====
Mike dies in the fire. Instead of the funeral scene, the sounds of a funeral are dubbed over shots of Los Angeles. Lily and Sam sort through Mike's effects. Sam returns to his New York office and discovers the manuscript that Mike wrote while he was in room 1408. As Sam reads the story, audio from Mike's experiences in the room is heard. In a final scene, Sam's office doors slam shut and Mike's father's voice says: "As you are, I was. As I am, you will be."

==== Alternate ending #3 ====
An alternative version of the theatrical ending, it has the same events but Lily does not notice Katie's voice on the tape and Mike reacts very happily at hearing her voice on the tape.

=== Home media ===
The DVD was released on October 2, 2007, by Genius Products with a standard 1-Disc Edition containing only the theatrical cut and a 2-Disc Collector's Edition that contained both the theatrical and director's cut. On September 16, 2008, Genius released the movie on Blu-ray containing the director's cut. For many years, the theatrical cut remained elusive, as streaming platforms and several television broadcasts only had the director's cut. However, in 2021, when Lionsgate acquired the Weinstein Company library (which included everything Dimension Films released post-2005), they released the theatrical cut onto streaming platforms for the first time. Lionsgate released the film containing both cuts onto Ultra HD Blu-ray on January 13, 2026, marking the first time since the initial 2007 DVD release that the theatrical cut has gotten a domestic physical home video release.

== Reception ==
=== Box office ===
In its opening weekend, 1408 opened in second place at the box office, grossing US$20.6 million in 2,678 theaters. 1408 had a production budget of US$25 million. The film went on to gross US$132 million, of which US$71.9 million was from Canada and the United States.

=== Critical response ===
On the review aggregator Rotten Tomatoes, 1408 holds a rating of 80% based on 176 reviews, with the site's critical consensus reading: "Relying on psychological tension rather than overt violence and gore, 1408 is a genuinely creepy thriller with a strong lead performance by John Cusack." On Metacritic, the film has an average score of 64 out of 100, based on 27 reviews. Audiences polled by CinemaScore gave the film an average grade of "B−" on an A+ to F scale.

James Berardinelli awarded the film three out of four, calling it "the best horror film of the year". He offered significant praise for Cusack's performance as Mike Enslin, writing: "This is John Cusack's movie to carry, and he has no problem taking it where it needs to go." He found the film "reminds us what it's like to be scared in a theater rather than overwhelmed by buckets of blood and gore". Some critics called the film far superior to other adaptations of Stephen King novels and stories. Mick LaSalle of the San Francisco Chronicle described it as "one of the good Stephen King adaptations, one that maintains its author's sly sense of humor and satiric view of human nature" and "more genuinely scary movie than most horror films".

Several critics found the film underwhelming. Wesley Morris of The Boston Globe wrote a mixed review, describing the film as "a lot of consonants and no vowels". He compared it unfavorably to The Shining, a similar King adaptation, believing 1408 lacked that film's "lunging horror and dramatic architecture". He wrote that it "conjures a wonderful anticipatory mood of dread in the first 30 minutes, then blows it to stylish smithereens". Rob Salem of the Toronto Star gave the film two out of four for seeming a predictable "hit and miss" production. Like Morris, Salem wrote: "Even as haunted hotel King movies go, 1408 is certainly no Shining. Not even the TV-movie version."

== Sequel ==
News of a sequel appeared in November 2026 with sources stating that Natalia Dyer & Elijah Wood would be starring with Håfström returning to write and direct and John Cusack and Samuel L. Jackson in talks to return in supporting roles. Mark Verheiden will also co-write the script.

== See also ==
- Cell
- List of adaptations of works by Stephen King
- List of ghost films
- Silent Hill 4: The Room
