= Chandler Riggs =

American actor (born 1999)

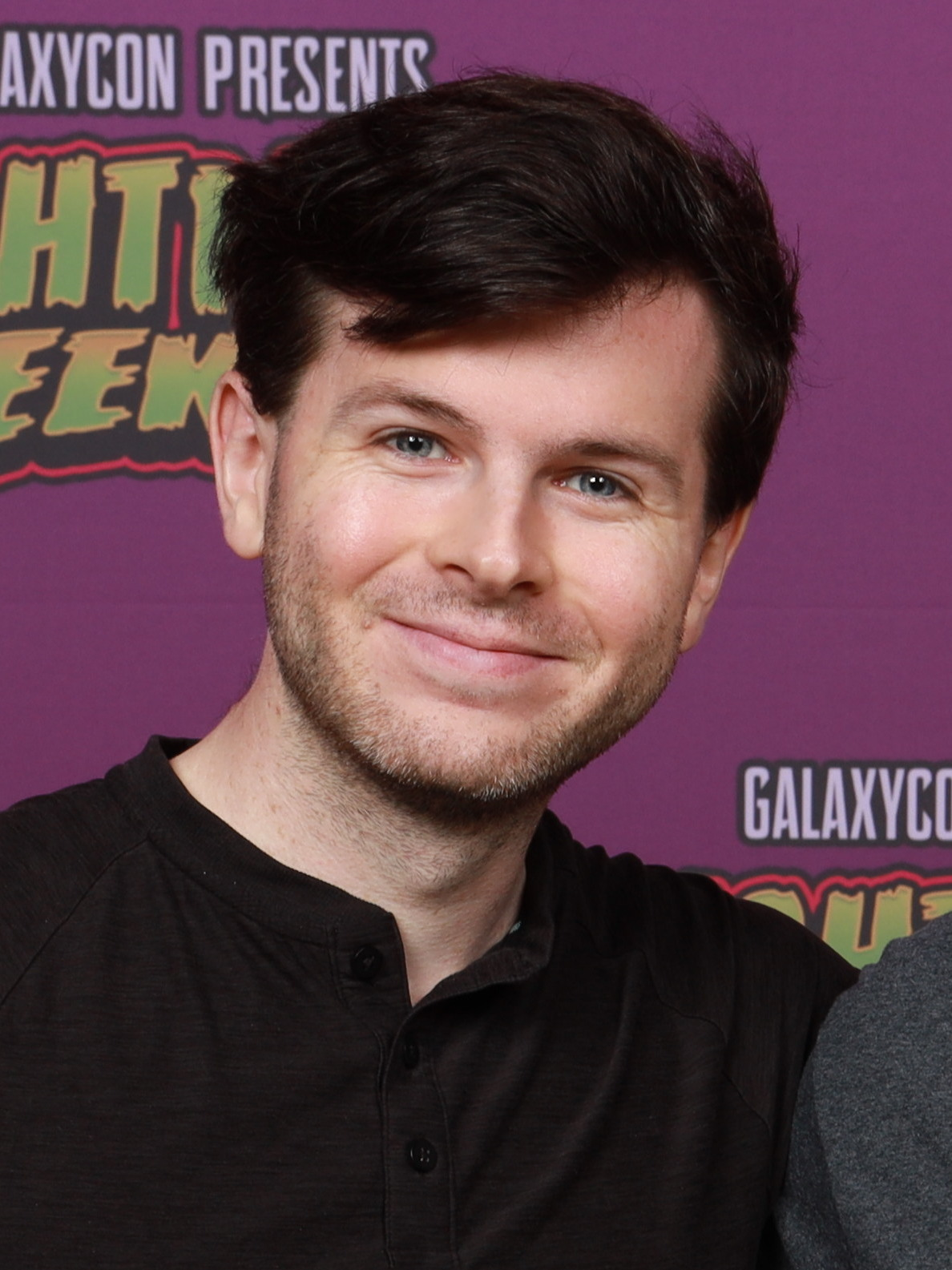
- Riggs at the 2025 Nightmare Weekend Chicago
- Born: Chandler Carlton Riggs; June 27, 1999 (age 27); Atlanta, Georgia, U.S.
- Other name: Eclipse
- Occupations: Actor; musician
- Years active: 2006–present
- Known for: The Walking Dead

Chandler Carlton Riggs (born June 27, 1999) is an American actor and musician. He rose to prominence for his regular role as Carl Grimes on the AMC horror-drama television series The Walking Dead (based on the comic book series of the same name) from 2010 to 2018. For his work on the series, Riggs won three Saturn Awards from five nominations and a Young Artist Award from three nominations.

Riggs has appeared in the films Get Low (2009), Mercy (2014), Keep Watching (2017), Only (2019), Inherit the Viper (2019), and Breakup Season (2024). In late 2017, Riggs started releasing electronic music under his stage name, Eclipse. In early 2019, he began recurring on the ABC drama series A Million Little Things.

== Early life ==
Riggs was born on June 27, 1999, in Atlanta, Georgia, to Gina Ann (née Carlton) and William Riggs. Riggs studied tap dancing for several years with So You Think You Can Dance finalist Zack Everhart.

== Career ==
=== Beginnings ===
Riggs began acting at age four. His early work included stage productions of The Wizard of Oz, where he played a Munchkin in his theater debut, and Oklahoma with Theater of the Stars at Atlanta's Fox Theatre. At age five, he starred in the indie horror film Jesus H. Zombie. At age nine in 2009, he was cast in his first two feature film roles in Get Low as Tom and in the television film The Wronged Man as seven-year-old Ryan Gregory. The latter film, which aired on Lifetime in 2010, saw Riggs acting opposite Julia Ormond as her son.

=== The Walking Dead ===
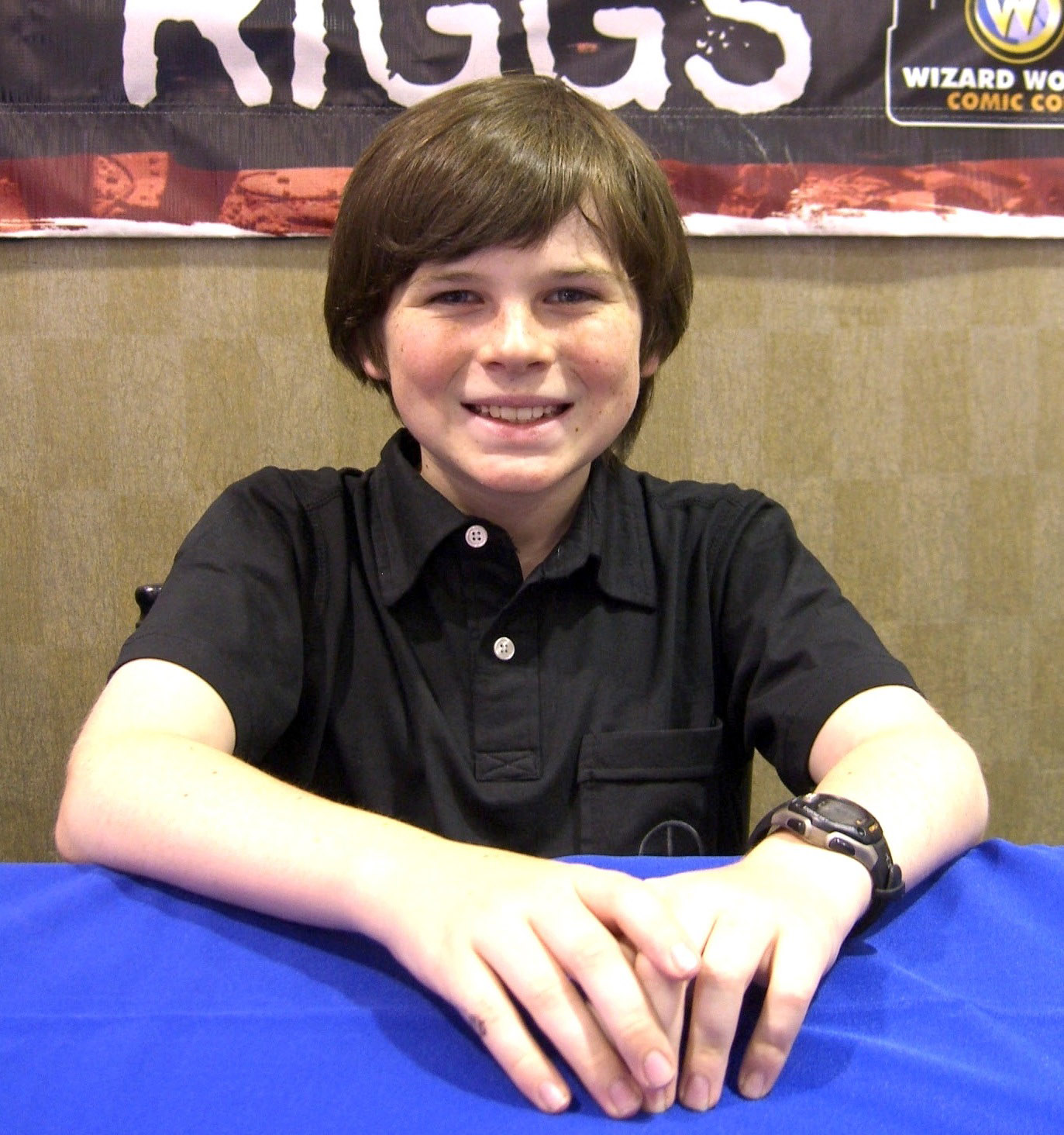
Riggs at the Big Apple Convention in Manhattan, May 21, 2011

In 2010 at age 10, Riggs was cast as Carl Grimes, his biggest role to date, on the AMC horror-drama television series The Walking Dead, which is based on the eponymous comic book series. Riggs had previously worked with the series' executive producer Gale Anne Hurd on The Wronged Man. The series follows Rick Grimes (Andrew Lincoln), the father of Riggs' character Carl, as he and his group of family, friends, and strangers fight to survive in a violent apocalyptic world populated with zombies and the few surviving humans, some of whom are even more dangerous than the zombies themselves. Proving to be a ratings success, the series became the #1 show in all of television among adults 18-49.

Riggs and the other main cast members of The Walking Dead won the 2012 Satellite Award for Best Cast in a Television Series. For his performance in the series as Carl, Riggs was nominated for the Saturn Award for Best Performance by a Younger Actor in a Television Series five consecutive times and won the award three times in 2014, 2016, and 2018. In 2014, Riggs also won a Young Artist Award for Best Performance in a TV Series - Leading Young Actor after previously being nominated for the award in 2012 and 2013. Along with several of his co-stars, Riggs lent his voice to a special episode of Robot Chicken titled "The Robot Chicken Walking Dead Special: Look Who’s Walking" in 2017, reprising his role as Carl.

In late 2017, Riggs was let go from The Walking Dead when, in a drastic departure from the comic book source material, his character was controversially killed off midway through the series' eighth season. Riggs' 77th and final episode of the series aired on February 10, 2018.

=== Further projects ===
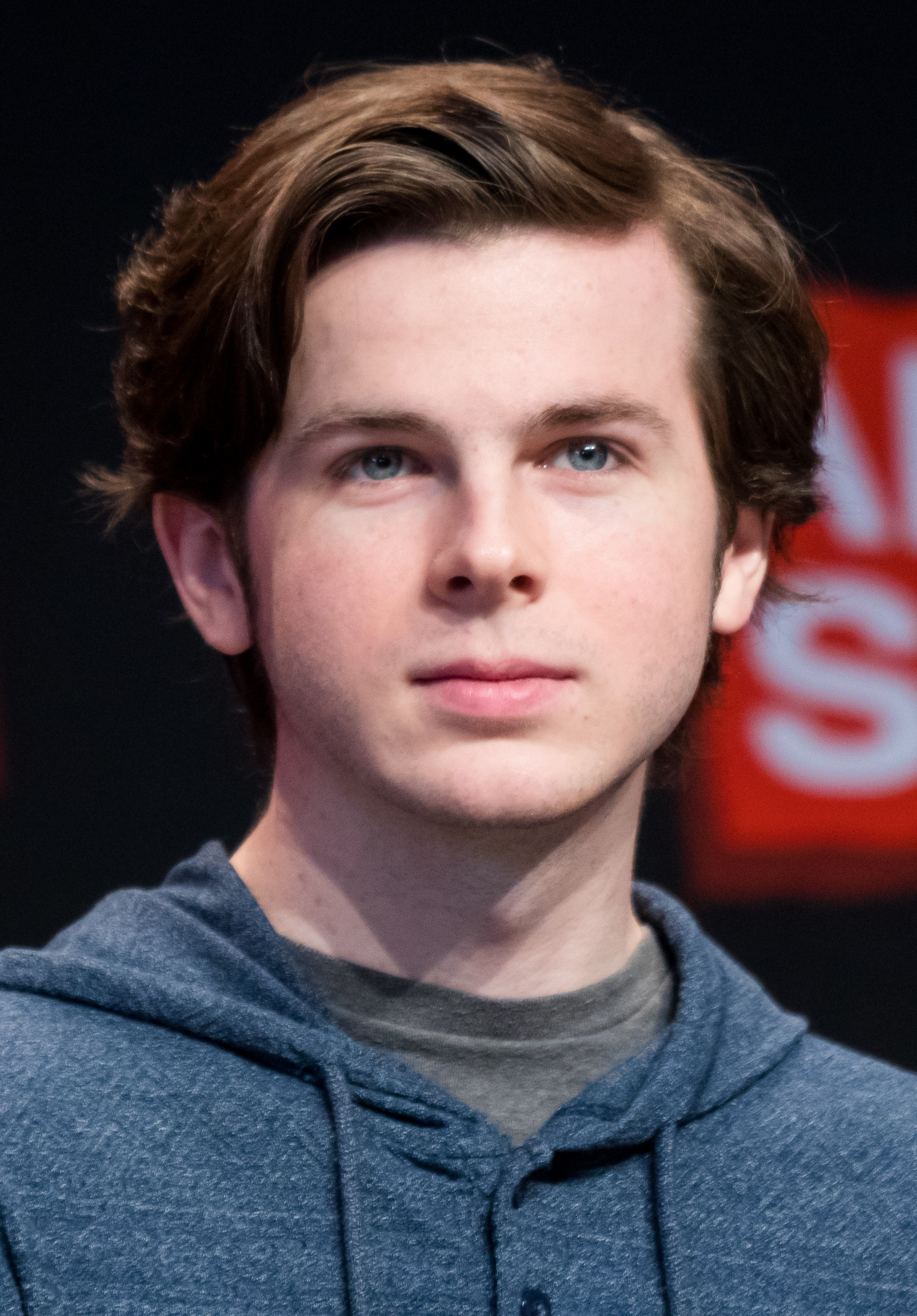
Riggs at the 2018Walker Con

Riggs appeared in the Blumhouse Productions supernatural thriller film Mercy in 2014 and the Voltage Pictures horror film Keep Watching in 2017. In 2017, Riggs started DJing various events around the United States and released his first song "Hold on" under his stage name "Eclipse" in December of that year. That same month, he was cast in the crime thriller film Inherit the Viper. He played the role of Cooper in the film, which premiered in 2019. He also starred in the science fiction thriller film Only in 2019. In January 2019, Riggs was cast as PJ for a multi-episode arc on the ABC freshman drama series A Million Little Things. Riggs, whose character's full name was revealed to be Patrick Nelson, returned for the series' second season.

In 2023, Riggs voiced Superman in the animated film Justice League x RWBY: Super Heroes & Huntsmen, and in 2024, portrayed Peter Parker in the fan film The Spider.

In 2024, Riggs starred in the independent film Breakup Season, marking his first time as a romantic lead, alongside actress Samantha Isler. For his work in the film, Riggs won 2 acting awards at the Waco Independent Film Festival and the Mentone Film Festival. He also won Best Cast Ensemble alongside the other 5 members of the film's cast.

== Filmography ==
=== Film ===
Key
†	Denotes films that have not yet been released

Year	Title	Role	Notes	Ref.
2006	Jesus H. Zombie	Egon / Zombie		
2009	Get Low	Tom		
2011	Terminus	Daniel	Short film	
2014	Mercy	George Bruckner		
2017	Keep Watching	DJ Miller		
2019	Only	Casey		
2019	Inherit the Viper	Cooper		
2023	Justice League x RWBY: Super Heroes & Huntsmen, Part One	Superman / Kal-El / Clark Kent	Direct-to-Video; Voice	
2024	Breakup Season	Ben		
2024	The Spider	Peter Parker	Also producer Short film	
2026	BIOHAZARD	Ethan Winters	Also writer and director Short film	
TBA	Hacked: A Double Entendre of Rage Fueled Karma †	"The Chameleon"		
TBA	Brother Save Us †	TBA		
TBA	The Last Time †	TBA	Filming	

=== Television ===
Year	Title	Role	Notes	Ref.
2010	The Wronged Man	Ryan Gregory (age 7)	Television film	
2010–2018 2022	The Walking Dead	Carl Grimes Farmer	Main cast (seasons 1–8); Cameo (season 11)	
2017	Robot Chicken	Carl Grimes	Episode: "The Robot Chicken Walking Dead Special: Look Who’s Walking"; Voice	
2019	A Million Little Things	Patrick "PJ" Nelson	Recurring role	

=== Video games ===
Year	Title	Role	Notes	Ref.
2023	The Walking Dead: Destinies	Male Woodbury Goon #2	Voice	

== Awards and nominations ==
Year	Award	Category	Work	Result	Ref.
2012	Young Artist Award	Best Performance in a TV Series - Leading Young Actor	The Walking Dead	Nominated	
2012	Satellite Award	Best Cast - Television Series	The Walking Dead	Won	
2013	Saturn Award	Best Performance by a Younger Actor in a Television Series	The Walking Dead	Won	
2013	Young Artist Award	Best Performance in a TV Series - Leading Young Actor	The Walking Dead	Nominated	
2014	Young Artist Award	Best Performance in a TV Series - Leading Young Actor	The Walking Dead	Won	
2015	Saturn Award	Best Performance by a Younger Actor in a Television Series	The Walking Dead	Nominated	
2016	Saturn Award	Best Performance by a Younger Actor in a Television Series	The Walking Dead	Won	
2017	Saturn Award	Best Performance by a Younger Actor in a Television Series	The Walking Dead	Nominated	
2018	Saturn Award	Best Performance by a Younger Actor in a Television Series	The Walking Dead	Won	
2024	Waco Independent Film Festival	Best Performance in a Feature Film	Breakup Season	Won	
2024	Mentone Film Festival	Best Actor in a Feature Film	Breakup Season	Won	
2024	Desertscape International Film Festival	Best Cast Ensemble	Breakup Season	Won	
