= Orthogonal (series) =

Novel series by Greg Egan

First editions (publ. Night Shade Books)

Orthogonal is a science fiction trilogy by Australian author Greg Egan taking place in a universe where, rather than three dimensions of space and one of time, there are four fundamentally identical dimensions. While the characters in the novels always perceive three of the dimensions as space and one as time, this classification depends entirely on their state of motion, and the dimension that one observer considers to be time can be seen as a purely spatial dimension by another observer.

The plot involves the inhabitants of a planet that comes under threat from a barrage of high-velocity meteors known as 'hurtlers', who launch a generation ship that exploits the distinctive relativistic effects present in this universe which allow far more time to elapse on the ship than passes on the home world, in order for the ship's inhabitants to have enough time to develop the technology needed to protect the planet. The three novels deal with a succession of increasingly advanced scientific discoveries, as well as a number of radical social changes in the culture of the generation ship's passengers.

Technically, the space-time of the universe portrayed in the novels has a positive-definite Riemannian metric, rather than a pseudo-Riemannian metric, which is the kind that describes our own universe.

The Orthogonal trilogy consists of the novels The Clockwork Rocket (published in 2011), The Eternal Flame (published in 2012) and The Arrows of Time (published in 2013).
