= Bifrost (magazine) =

French science fiction magazine

Bifrost is a French science fiction magazine that is published every three months. It was first published in 1996.

In October 2021, the Stephen King short story "Willie the Weirdo" was first published in French in issue 104 of Bifrost under the title "Willie le Zinzin".
