= 2008 in Australian literature =

This article presents a list of the historical events and publications of Australian literature during 2008.

== Events ==
- "The Bulletin" magazine publishes its last issue, the first was in 1880
- The Australia Council for the Arts announces Christopher Koch and Gerald Murnane as recipients of its 2008 emeritus writers awards
- The Australian Federal Government announces funding for a new chair of Australian Literature based at the University of Western Australia
- Clunes, Victoria, holds its second Booktown weekend
- The first Crime and Justice Festival in held in Melbourne over the weekend of 19–20 July
- Australia wins the right to host the 2010 World SF convention in Melbourne
- A number of previously unknown Banjo Paterson poems are found in an old cash book dating back to the Boer War
- UNESCO names Melbourne as its second City of Literature, after Edinburgh received the first such award in 2004
- Caro Llewellyn, a former director of the Sydney Writers' Festival and PEN World Voices Festival in New York, is appointed as director of the new Centre for Books, Writing and Ideas (now called the Wheeler Centre) in Melbourne
- The Indie Book Awards are presented for the first time

== Major publications ==
=== Literary fiction ===
- Debra Adelaide – The Household Guide to Dying
- Murray Bail – The Pages
- Geraldine Brooks – People of the Book
- Peter Carey – His Illegal Self
- Luke Davies – God of Speed
- Robert Drewe – The Rip
- Richard Flanagan – Wanting
- Helen Garner – The Spare Room
- Peter Goldsworthy – Everything I Knew
- Kate Grenville – The Lieutenant
- Vicki Hastrich – The Great Arch
- Wendy James – The Steele Diaries
- Susan Johnson – Life in Seven Mistakes
- Toni Jordan – Addition
- Sofie Laguna – One Foot Wrong
- Nam Le – The Boat
- Joan London – The Good Parents
- Louis Nowra – Ice
- Kevin Rabelais – The Landscape of Desire
- Claire Thomas – fugitive blue
- Steve Toltz – A Fraction of the Whole
- Ian Townsend – The Devil's Eye
- Christos Tsiolkas – The Slap
- Tim Winton – Breath
- Arnold Zable – Sea of Many Returns

=== Children's and young adult fiction ===
- Isobelle Carmody – The Stone Key
- Kate Constable – Always Mackenzie
- Alison Croggon — The Singing
- Mem Fox and Helen Oxenbury – Ten Little Fingers and Ten Little Toes
- Jackie French – A Rose for the ANZAC Boys
- Mark Greenwood and Frane Lessac – Simpson and His Donkey
- Sonya Hartnett – Sadie and Ratz
- Jack Heath – Money Run
- Simone Howell – Everything Beautiful
- Catherine Jinks – Genius Squad
- Maureen McCarthy – Somebody's Crying
- Melina Marchetta – Finnikin of the Rock
- Sophie Masson – The Case of the Diamond Shadow
- Garth Nix – Superior Saturday
- Penni Russon – The Indigo Girls
- Shaun Tan – Tales from Outer Suburbia
- Lili Wilkinson – The (Not Quite) Perfect Boyfriend
- Sean Williams
  - The Changeling
  - Dust Devils

=== Crime and mystery ===
- Peter Corris – Open File
- Leah Giarratano – Voodoo Doll
- Kerry Greenwood – Murder on a Midsummer Night
- Marion Halligan – Murder on the Apricot Coast
- Jarad Henry – Blood Sunset
- Katherine Howell – The Darkest Hour
- Barry Maitland – Bright Air
- PD Martin – Fan Mail
- Camilla Nelson – Crooked
- Malla Nunn – A Beautiful Place to Die
- Alex Palmer – The Tattooed Man
- Bronwyn Parry – As Darkness Falls
- Kel Robertson – Smoke and Mirrors
- Michael Robotham – Shatter

=== Romance ===
- Anne Gracie – The Stolen Princess
- Stephanie Laurens – The Edge of Desire
- Margaret Leigh – The Heart Divided
- Estelle Pinney – Burnt Sunshine

=== Science fiction and fantasy ===
- K. A. Bedford – Time Machines Repaired While-U-Wait
- Honey Brown – Red Queen
- Nathan Burrage – Fivefold
- Sara Douglass – The Twisted Citadel
- Greg Egan
  - "Crystal Nights"
  - Dark Integers and Other Stories
  - Incandescence
  - "Lost Continent"
- Jennifer Fallon – The Chaos Crystal
- Pamela Freeman – Deep Water
- Alison Goodman – The Two Pearls of Wisdom
- Traci Harding – The Dragon Queens
- Simon Haynes – Hal Spacejock: No Free Lunch
- Margo Lanagan – Tender Morsels
- Juliet Marillier – Heir to Sevenwaters
- Karen Miller – Hammer of God
- K. E. Mills – The Accidental Sorcerer
- Cat Sparks – "Sammarynda Deep"
- Sean Williams – Earth Ascendant

=== Drama ===
- John Doyle – The Pig Iron People
- Alexandra Edmondson – Cruising
- Joanna Murray-Smith – Ninety

=== Poetry ===
See also 2008 in poetry

- Robert Adamson – The Golden Bird: New and Selected Poems, winner of the C.J. Dennis Prize for Poetry in the 2009 Victorian Premier's Literary Awards, shortlisted for the 2009 Age Book of the Year Awards
- Michael Brennan – Unanimous Night
- David Brooks – The Balcony, finalist for the 2008 Kenneth Slessor Prize for Poetry; University of Queensland Press, ISBN 978-0-7022-3669-3
- Brook Emery – At a Slight Angle: and Other Poems
- Jamie Grant – 100 Australian Poems You Need to Know (edited)
- Elizabeth Hodgson – Skin Painting, winner of the 2007 David Unaipon Award; University of Queensland Press, ISBN 978-0-7022-3677-8
- Sarah Holland-Batt – Aria
- Clive James – Opal Sunset: Selected Poems, 1958–2008
- John Kinsella – Divine Comedy, University of Queensland Press, ISBN 978-0-7022-3666-2
- Anthony Lawrence – Bark, University of Queensland Press, ISBN 978-0-7022-3664-8
- David Malouf – Revolving Days, University of Queensland Press, ISBN 978-0-7022-3635-8
- Peter Rose editor – The Best Australian Poems 2008 Black Inc., ISBN 978-1-86395-303-0
- Alan Wearne – The Australian Popular Songbook

=== Non-fiction ===
- Germaine Greer – On Rage
- Chloe Hooper – The Tall Man: Death and Life on Palm Island
- John Silvester and Andrew Rule – Underbelly: The Gangland War

=== Biographies ===
- Peter Costello – The Costello Memoirs
- Jacqueline Kent – An Exacting Heart: The Story of Hephzibah Menuhin
- Andrew Riemer – A Family History of Smoking

== Awards and honours ==
=== Lifetime achievement ===
Award	Author
Christopher Brennan Award	Not awarded
Patrick White Award	John Romeril

=== Literary ===
Award	Author	Title	Publisher
The Age Book of the Year	Don Watson	American Journeys	Random House
ALS Gold Medal	Michelle de Kretser	The Lost Dog	Allen & Unwin
Colin Roderick Award	Malcolm Knox	Jamaica	Allen & Unwin
Indie Book Awards Book of the Year	Tim Winton	Breath	Hamish Hamilton
Nita Kibble Literary Award	Carol Lefevre	Nights in the Asylum	Vintage

=== Fiction ===
==== International ====
Award	Region	Category	Author	Title	Publisher
Commonwealth Writers' Prize	SE Asia and South Pacific	Best Novel	Steven Carroll	The Time We Have Taken	HarperCollins
Commonwealth Writers' Prize	SE Asia and South Pacific	Best First Novel	Karen Foxlee	The Anatomy of Wings	University of Queensland Press

==== National ====
Award	Author	Title	Publisher
ABC Fiction Award	Kain Massin	God for the Killing	ABC Books
Adelaide Festival Awards for Literature	Roger McDonald	The Ballad of Desmond Kale	Vintage Books
The Age Book of the Year Award	Tim Winton	Breath	Hamish Hamilton
Australia-Asia Literary Award	David Malouf	The Complete Stories	Knopf
The Australian/Vogel Literary Award	Andrew Cromme	Document Z	Allen and Unwin
Barbara Jefferis Award	Rhyll McMaster	Feather Man	Brandl and Schlesinger
Indie Book Awards Book of the Year – Fiction	Tim Winton	Breath	Hamish Hamilton
Indie Book Awards Book of the Year – Debut Fiction	Toni Jordan	Addition	Text Publishing
Miles Franklin Award	Steven Carroll	The Time We Have Taken	HarperCollins
Prime Minister's Literary Awards	Steven Conte	The Zookeeper's War	Fourth Estate
New South Wales Premier's Literary Awards	Michelle de Kretser	The Lost Dog	Allen & Unwin
Queensland Premier's Literary Awards	Helen Garner	The Spare Room	Text Publishing
South Australian Premier's Awards	Roger McDonald	The Ballad of Desmond Kale	Vintage Books
Victorian Premier's Literary Awards	Helen Garner	The Spare Room	Text Publishing
Western Australian Premier's Book Awards	Richard Flanagan	Wanting	Random House

=== Children and young adult ===
==== National ====
Award	Category	Author	Title	Publisher
Aurealis Award	Young Adult Novel	Melina Marchetta	Finnikin of the Rock	Viking Press
Aurealis Award	Young Adult Short Story	Trent Jamieson	"Cracks"	Shiny, magazine
Children's Book of the Year Award	Older Readers	Sonya Hartnett	The Ghost's Child	Viking Books
Children's Book of the Year Award	Younger Readers	Carole Wilkinson	Dragon Moon	Black Dog Books
Children's Book of the Year Award	Picture Book	Matt Ottley	Requiem for a Beast	Lothian
Children's Book of the Year Award	Early Childhood	Aaron Blabey	Pearl Barley and Charlie Parsley	Viking Books
Davitt Award	Young Adult Novel	Mandy Sayer	The Night has a Thousand Eyes	Fourth Estate
Indie Book Awards Book of the Year	Children's & YA	Shaun Tan	Tales from Outer Suburbia	Allen & Unwin
New South Wales Premier's Literary Awards	Children's	Li Cunxin and Anne Spudvilas	The Peasant Prince	Viking Books
New South Wales Premier's Literary Awards	Young People's	James Roy	Town	University of Queensland Press
Queensland Premier's Literary Awards	Children's	Li Cunxin and Anne Spudvilas	The Peasant Prince	Viking Books
Queensland Premier's Literary Awards	Young Adult	Matt Ottley	Requiem for a Beast	Lothian
South Australian Premier's Awards	Children's	Michael Gerard Bauer	Don't Call Me Ishmael	Omnibus Books
Victorian Premier's Literary Award	Young Adult Fiction	Brigid Lowry	Tomorrow All Will Be Beautiful	Allen and Unwin
Western Australian Premier's Book Awards	Children's	Liz Lofthouse and Robert Ingpen	Ziba Came on a Boat	Viking Books
Western Australian Premier's Book Awards	Writing for Young Adults	Ken Spillman	Love is a UFO	Pan Macmillan

=== Crime and mystery ===
==== National ====
Award	Category	Author	Title	Publisher
Davitt Award	Novel	Katherine Howell	Frantic	Pan Macmillan
Davitt Award	Young adult novel	Mandy Sayer	The Night Has a Thousand Eyes	Fourth Estate
Davitt Award	True crime	Janet Fife-Yeomans	Killing Jodie	Penguin
Davitt Award	Readers' Choice	Lindy Cameron	Scarlet Stiletto: The First Cut	Mira Books
Ned Kelly Awards	Novel	Michael Robotham	Shatter	Sphere Books
Ned Kelly Awards	First novel	Chris Womersley	The Low Road	Scribe
Ned Kelly Awards	True crime	Evan McHugh	Red Centre, Dark Heart	Penguin
Ned Kelly Awards	Lifetime achievement	Marele Day		

=== Science fiction ===
Award	Category	Author	Title	Publisher
Aurealis Award	SF Novel	K. A. Bedford	Time Machines Repaired While-U-Wait	Edge Science Fiction and Fantasy Publishing
Aurealis Award	SF Short Story	Simon Brown	"The Empire"	Dreaming Again, Voyager
Aurealis Award	Fantasy Novel	Alison Goodman	The Two Pearls of Wisdom	HarperCollins
Aurealis Award	Fantasy Short Story	Cat Sparks	"Sammarynda Deep"	Paper Cities, Senses 5 Press
Aurealis Award	Horror Novel	John Harwood	The Seance	Random House
Aurealis Award	Horror Short Story	Kirstyn McDermott	"Painlessness"	Greatest Uncommon Denominator #2
Ditmar Award	Novel	Sean Williams	Saturn Returns	Orbit Books
Ditmar Award	Novella/Novelette	Cat Sparks	"Lady of Adestan"	Orb #7
Ditmar Award	Short Story	Rick Kennett	"The Dark and What It Said"	Andromeda Spaceways Inflight Magazine #28
Ditmar Award	Collected Work	Jonathan Strahan ed.	The New Space Opera	HarperCollins
Ditmar Award	Collected Work	Russell B. Farr ed.	Fantastic Wonder Stories	Ticonderoga Publications

=== Poetry ===
Award	Author	Title	Publisher
Adelaide Festival Awards for Literature	John Tranter	Urban Myths: 210 Poems	University of Queensland Press
The Age Book of the Year	J. S. Harry	Not Finding Wittgenstein	Giramondo Publishing
Anne Elder Award	Sarah Holland-Batt	Aria	University of Queensland Press
Anne Elder Award	Sandy Fitts	View from the Lucky Hotel	Five Islands Press
Grace Leven Prize for Poetry	Alan Wearne	The Australian Popular Songbook	Giramondo Publishing
Mary Gilmore Prize	Nathan Shepherdson	Sweeping the Light Back into the Mirror	University of Queensland Press
New South Wales Premier's Literary Awards	Kathryn Lomer	Two Kinds of Silence	University of Queensland Press
Queensland Premier's Literary Awards	David Malouf	Typewriter Music	University of Queensland Press
Victorian Premier's Literary Award	Lisa Gorton	Press Release	Giramondo Publishing
Western Australian Premier's Book Awards	Bronwyn Lea	The Other Way Out	Giramondo Publishing

=== Drama ===
Award	Author	Title	Publisher
Patrick White Playwrights' Award	Nicki Bloom	Bloodwood	

=== Non-fiction ===
Award	Category	Author	Title	Publisher
Adelaide Festival Awards for Literature	Non-Fiction	Jacob Rosenberg	Sunrise West	Brandl and Schlesinger
The Age Book of the Year	Non-fiction	Don Watson	American Journeys	Random House
Children's Book of the Year Award	Eve Pownall Award for Information Books	Frances Watts, illus David Legge	Parsley Rabbit's Book about Books	ABC Books
Davitt Award	True crime	Janet Fife-Yeomans	Killing Jodie	Penguin Books
Indie Book Awards Book of the Year	Non-Fiction	Don Watson	American Journeys	Random House
National Biography Award	Biography	Philip Dwyer	Napoleon: The Path To Power 1769–1799	Bloomsbury Publishing
National Biography Award	Biography	Graham Seal	These Few Lines: A Convict Story – The Lost Lives of Myra & William Sykes	ABC Books
Prime Minister's Literary Awards	Non-fiction	Philip Jones	Ochre and Rust: Artefacts and Encounters on Australian Frontiers	Wakefield Press
New South Wales Premier's Literary Awards	Non-fiction	Tom Griffiths	Slicing the Silence: Voyaging to Antarctica	University of New South Wales Press
New South Wales Premier's History Awards	Australian History	Paul Ham	Vietnam: The Australian War	HarperCollins
New South Wales Premier's History Awards	Community and Regional History	Dianne Johnson, in collaboration with the residents of the Gully and their descendants	Sacred Waters: the story of the Blue Mountains Gully Traditional Owners	Halstead Press
New South Wales Premier's History Awards	General History	Michael A. McDonnell	The Politics of War: Race, Class and Conflict in Revolutionary Virginia	University of North Carolina Press
New South Wales Premier's History Awards	Young People's	Robert Lewis and Tim Gurry	Australians in the Vietnam War	Ryebuck Media Pty Ltd
Queensland Premier's Literary Awards	Non-fiction	Craig Sherborne	Muck	Black Inc
Queensland Premier's Literary Awards	History	Professor Marilyn Lake and Professor Henry Reynolds	Drawing the Global Colour Line	Melbourne University Press
Victorian Premier's Literary Award	Non-fiction	Meredith Hooper	The Ferocious Summer: Palmer's Penguins and the Warming of Antarctica	Allen & Unwin
Western Australian Premier's Book Awards	Non-fiction	Antonio Buti	Sir Ronald Wilson: A Matter of Conscience	University of Western Australia Press
Western Australian Premier's Book Awards	Western Australian history	Ruth Marchant James	Cottesloe: A Town of Distinction	Town of Cottesloe

== Deaths ==
- 11 January – Nancy Phelan, author (born 1913)
- 21 January – Sandra Harvey, journalist and true crime writer (born 1958)
- 27 March – Alan Collins, short story writer (born 1928)
- 8 April – John Button, politician and author (born 1933)
- 26 April – Pamela Bone, journalist and author (born 1940)
- 29 April – John Hooker, author (born 1932)
- 21 June – Justina Williams, poet (born 1916)
- 24 August – Patricia Rolfe, short story writer and critic (born 1920)
- 30 September – Eleanor Spence, writer for children (born 1928)
- 30 October – Jacob Rosenberg, poet and memoirist (born 1922)
- 15 November – Ivan Southall, writer for children (born 1921)
- 10 December – Dorothy Porter, poet (born 1954)

== See also ==
- 2008 in Australia
- 2008 in literature
- 2008 in poetry
- List of years in literature
- List of years in Australian literature
- List of Australian literary awards
