= Ekaterina Sedia bibliography =

A list of works by or about of Ekaterina Sedia, American biologist and speculative fiction writer.

== Fiction ==
=== Novels ===
- According to Crow (May 2005)
- The Secret History of Moscow (November 2007)
- The Alchemy of Stone (July 2008)
- The House of Discarded Dreams (November 2010)
- Heart of Iron (July 2011)

=== Short fiction ===
- "Alphabet Angels" (with David Bartell) in Analog Science Fiction and Fact (March 2005)
- "Smiling Vermin" (with David Bartell) in Analog Science Fiction and Fact (May 2005)
- "Kamikaze Bugs" (with David Bartell) in Analog Science Fiction and Fact (January/February 2006)
- "Daniel Dreams" in Fortean Bureau #29 (March 2005)
- "Spiders&Saints" in Bare Bone 7 (April 2005, Raw Dog Screaming Press)
- "Frederick Finds God" (flash) in Fusing Horizons (September 2004)
- "Making Ivy" in Poe's Progeny (May 2005)
- "Just Chutney" in Aeon Magazine #3 (May 2005)
- "Every Eight and Eleven" in The Elastic Book of Numbers (February 2005, Elastic Press)
- "Animals That Belong to the Emperor" in Between Kisses (February 2005)
- "Memories of The Fog" in Potter's Field (May 2005, Sam's Dot Publishing)
- "Still Life in the Mirror" in Panic (August 2005, Sam's Dot Publishing)
- "Tapestry in Black and White" in Dream the Dark Majestic (August 2005, Ragemachine)
- "Huni's Love of Clay" in Travel a Time Historic (September 2005, Ragemachine)
- "Walrus Skin" in The Walri Project (forthcoming)
- "Heart of the Scarab" in Lenox Avenue #6 (May/June 2005)
- "Yakov and the Crows" in Book of Dark Wisdom #10 (December 2006)
- "The Mermaid Collector" in Book of Dark Wisdom (forthcoming)
- "Hector Meets the King" in New Writings in the Fantastic (Fall 2007, Pendragon Press)
- "Torsion" in Nemonymous 7 (2007)
- "Kikimora" in Jabberwocky #1 (July 2005, Prime Books)
- "God's Chosen" in Oceans of the Mind #XVIII (2005)
- "Fistula" in Liquid Laughter Volume 1: Medicine Show (November 2006)
- "Hydraulic" in Spicy Slipstream Stories (forthcoming, Wheatland Press)
- "Sagekites' Land" in Strange Pleasures #6 anthology (forthcoming, Prime Books)
- "Manuel and the Magic Fox" in Fantasy Magazine #3 (2006, Prime Books)
- "A Thousand Cuts" in Other Than #1 (forthcoming)
- "Munashe and the Spirits" GrendelSong # 1 (September 2006)
- "Cherrystone and Shards of Ice" HP Lovecraft's Magazine of Horror (forthcoming)
- "A Play for a Boy and Sockpuppets" in The New Book of Masks (February 2007, Raw Dog Screaming Press)
- "Simargl and the Rowan Tree" in Mythic # 2 (September 2006)
- "The Clockmaker's Daughter" in Horrors Beyond II: Stories of Strange Creations (December 2007, Elder Signs Press)
- "Redemption of Nepheli" in Jim Baen's Universe (April 2007)
- "Ebb and Flow" in Japanese Dreams a (2008, Prime Books)
- "Zombie Lenin" in Fantasy Sampler (Spring 2007, Prime Books)
- "Out of Her Element" in Magic in the Mirrorstone (2008, Mirrorstone Books)
- "Seas of the World" in Sybil's Garage #4 (May 2007)
- "Virus Changes Skin" in Analog Science Fiction and Fact (October 2007)
- "The Taste of Wheat" in Clarkesworld Magazine #11 (August 2007)
- "The Rats That Didn't Sing" in Cats With Wings #3 (January 2008)
- "The Disemboweler" in Lone Star Stories (February 2008)
- "By the Liter" in Subterranean Magazine (Spring 2008)
- "A Short Encyclopedia of Lunar Seas" in The Endicott Studio Journal of Mythic Arts (August 2008)
- "Two of Cups" in Behind the Wainscot # 15 (August 2008)
- "Herding Vegetable Sheep" in Clarkesworld Magazine #30 (March 2009)
- "Citizen Komarova Finds Love," in Exotic Gothic 3 (2009, Ash-Tree Press)
- "Helena" in Exotic Gothic 4 (2012, PS Publishing)
- "A handsome fellow", Asimov's Science Fiction, 36/10&11 (Oct/Nov 2012)

=== Poetry ===
- "The Sandman's Sestina" in Dream the Dark Majestic (August 2005, Ragemachine)
- "The Inquisitor's Villanelle" in Goblin Fruit #1 (April 2006)
- "Mermaid" in Goblin Fruit (Spring 2007)

== Non-Fiction ==
- "Making Neologisms Work in Speculative Literature" in Reflection's Edge (February 2005)

== Critical studies and reviews of Sedia's work ==
The house of discarded dreams

- Heck, Peter (February 2015). "On Books". Asimov's Science Fiction. 39 (2): 107–111.
