= Sammarynda Deep =

Short story by Cat Sparks

- Short story by Cat Sparks
- Country: Australia
- Language: English
- Genre: Fantasy short story

Publication
- Published in: Paper Cities
- Publication type: Anthology
- Publisher: Senses 5 Press
- Media type: Print (paperback)
- Publication date: 2008

"Sammarynda Deep" is a 2008 fantasy short story by Cat Sparks.

This is the first story in the author's Sammarynda series, being followed by "The Alabaster Child" (2011), "Beyond the Farthrest Shore" (2013), and "The New Chonicles of Andras Thorn" (2014).

== Background ==
"Sammarynda Deep" was first published in 2008 in Paper Cities, edited by Ekaterina Sedia and published by Senses 5 Press. It was featured alongside 20 other stories by the authors Forrest Aguirre, Hal Duncan, Richard Parks, Cat Rambo, Jay Lake, Greg van Eekhout, Steve Berman, Stephanie Campisi, Mark Teppo, Paul Meloy, Vylar Kaftan, Michael Jasper, Ben Peek, Kaaron Warren, Darin C. Bradley, Jenn Reese, David J. Schwartz, Anna Tambour, Barth Anderson, and Catherynne M. Valente.

== Awards ==
"Sammarynda Deep" won the 2008 Aurealis Award for best fantasy short story and was a short-list nominee for 2009 Ditmar Award for best short story but lost to Margo Lanagan's "The Goosle".
