= Australian Theatre for Young People =

Australian national youth theatre company

- ATYP
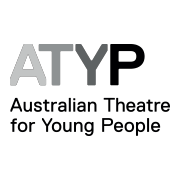
- Interactive map of Australian Theatre for Young People
- Address: 52-58 William Street; Woolloomooloo, New South Wales, Australia
- Coordinates: 33°52′25.3″S 151°12′53.2″E
- Type: Not-for-profit theatre
- Event: Youth theatre company

Construction
- Opened: 1964

Website
- atyp.com.au

Australian Theatre for Young People (ATYP) is the flagship youth theatre company located in the Walsh Bay Arts Precinct, New South Wales, Australia. Founded in 1963 by playwright Eleanor Witcombe, it has developed and nurtured generations of young talent, counting among its alumni internationally acclaimed actors such as Nicole Kidman, Toni Collette, Rose Byrne, Rebel Wilson, and Baz Luhrmann.

== History ==
The first committee was formed in 1963 and consisted of Alastair Duncan as chairman, Diana Sharpe as secretary, Nigel Lovell as treasurer, as well as Ellis Irving, Owen Weingott and Wendy Blacklock.

ATYP's first production was the comedy She Stoops to Conquer - Goldsmith Examined by Oliver Goldsmith, adapted and directed by Owen Weingott.

From its early years, the company performed adult-led productions for young audiences. In response to growing demand, in 1967 ATYP launched a workshop program allowing young people aged 10–15 to participate in creating theatre.

Over the next decades, ATYP evolved into a flagship national youth theatre company, commissioning original Australian work, touring nationally, and helping launch many acclaimed careers. It continues to bridge emerging artists with professional practice and remains a major provider of theatre training and development programs for young Australians.

Notable programs include their Fresh Ink Mentoring program and newly created ATYP Originals program, both of which aim to support and develop emerging playwrights by providing professional mentorship, dramaturgical support, and opportunities for public presentation of new work.

== Location ==
Since 2022, ATYP has been based at Pier 2/3 in the Walsh Bay Arts Precinct, Sydney, returning to the historic waterfront location after major renovations to the site. As part of the redevelopment, ATYP gained a permanent home in the newly built Rebel Theatre, a purpose-built venue named after actor, alumna, and major supporter Rebel Wilson, whose philanthropic contribution helped make the space possible.

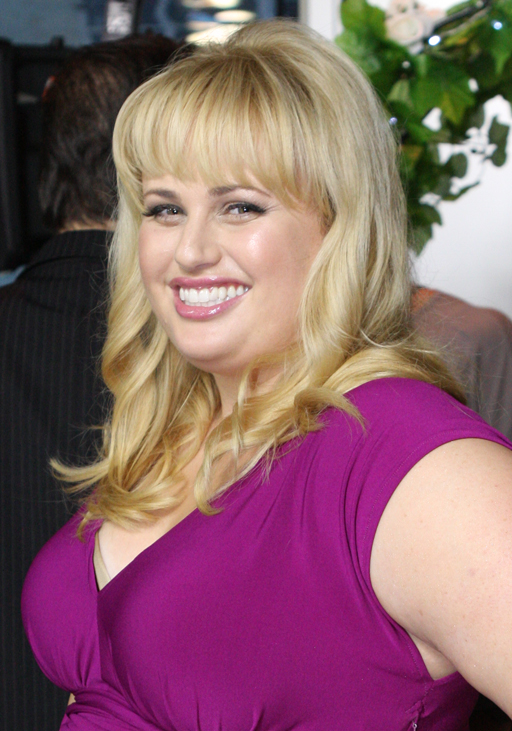
Rebel Wilson

Previously, ATYP had been located at The Wharf, Pier 4/5, from 1997 until 2018, when construction began on the broader Walsh Bay Arts Precinct redevelopment. During the interim construction period, ATYP temporarily relocated its office to Woolloomooloo and presented works across multiple venues including the SBW Stables Theatre, Riverside Theatres Parramatta, and The Joan in Penrith.

== Notable alumni ==
Alumni of the company include:

- Natasha Bassett
- Mitchell Butel
- Rose Byrne
- Rob Carlton
- Kyly Clarke
- Salvatore Coco
- Toni Collette
- Abbie Cornish
- Maeve Dermody
- Michael Gow
- Lally Katz
- Nicole Kidman
- Beejan Land
- Lenka
- Ben Lewis
- Alexander Lewis
- Baz Luhrmann
- Alyssa McClelland
- Brandon McClelland
- Rod Mullinar
- Zoe Naylor
- Dominic Purcell
- George Shevtsov
- Phoebe Tonkin
- Jessica Tovey
- Sophie Wilde
- Felix Williamson
- Rebel Wilson
- Daniel Wyllie
- Aden Young

== Productions ==
ATYP productions have toured regionally, such as Sugarland, nationally, such as A Town Named War Boy, and internationally, such as Patrice Balbina's Chance Encounter with the End of the World.

Productions since 2011 include:

Year	Title
2011	Cursed Hearts
2011	Tell It Like It Isn't
2011	Ishmael and the Return of the Dugongs
2011	Rainbow's End
2012	Grounded
2012	The Tender Age
2012	Animal Farm
2012	Max Remy Super Spy
2012	Cockroach
2012	The Dwarf Revue
2012	The One Sure Thing
2013	The Shape of Things
2013	Out of Place
2013	Spur of the Moment
2013	Tease
2013	The Dwarf Revue 2
2013	Compass
2013	Key to the City
2014	M.Rock
2014	Sugarland
2014	The Voices Project: Bite Me
2014	Luke Lloyd: Alienoid
2015	A Town Named War Boy
2015	Between Us
2015	Then
2015	War Crimes
2015	The Trolleys
2016	Patrice Balbina's Chance Encounter with the End of the World
2016	The Big Dry
2016	Spring Awakening: The Musical
2016	Fight with all of Your Might the Zombies of Tonight
2016	All Good Things
2017	Homeroom Series Double Bill
2017	Dignity of Risk
2017	Michael Swordfish
2017	Oedipus Doesn't Live Here Anymore
2017	Intersection
2017	Wonderfly
2018	Patrice Balbina's Chance Encounter with the End of the World
2018	Impending Everyone
2018	Intersection 2018: Chrysalis
2018	A Town Named War Boy
2018	The Climbing Tree
2018	Charlie Pligrim
2019	Follow Me Home
2019	April Aardvark
2019	Fangirls
2019	Bathory Begins
2019	Intersection 2019: Arrival
2020	The 1s, The 0s, and Everything In Between
2020	Intersection 2020: Beat
2020	Soul Trading
2020	The Lies We Were Told
2020	Lights in the Park
2021	Follow Me Home & national tour
2021	Lights in the Park
2021	Fangirls
2021	The Lies We Were Told
2021	Shack
2021	Soul Trading
2022	M.Rock
2022	The Deb
2022	A Clockwork Orange: A Play with Music
2023	The Resistance
2024	Saplings
2024	Past the Shallows
2025	Converted
2026	The Last Train to Madeline
2026	Saplings National Tour
2026	Straight Panic
