= The Rise and Fall of D.O.D.O. =

2017 novel by Neal Stephenson and Nicole Galland

- First edition cover art
- Author: Neal Stephenson and Nicole Galland
- Language: English
- Genre: Science fiction
- Publisher: William Morrow
- Publication date: June 13, 2017
- Publication place: United States
- Pages: 768
- ISBN: 978-0-06-240916-4
- Followed by: Master of the Revels: A Return to Neal Stephenson's D.O.D.O.
- Website: Harper Collins

The Rise and Fall of D.O.D.O. is a science fiction novel by American writers Neal Stephenson and Nicole Galland, published in 2017. A secret U.S. government agency known as the Department of Diachronic Operations (D.O.D.O.) attempts to change history through the use of magic. Stephenson and Galland had previously written together on The Mongoliad.

== Plot ==
The mysterious Tristan Lyons hires Dr. Melisande Stokes, a Harvard linguistics lecturer, to translate a variety of historic texts. The work is classified, to the point that Lyons cannot even reveal the full name of D.O.D.O., the secret government agency that he works for. Stokes' translations suggest that magic and witches existed in the historical record, and also that magic grew weaker and ceased to function sometime during the Industrial Revolution. Stokes and Lyons discover that photography nullifies magic in the general area by causing a wave function collapse. Magic use ended worldwide when a photograph was taken of the solar eclipse of July 28, 1851.

Lyons recruits Dr. Frank Oda, a former MIT physicist who once worked on a device that could prevent wave function collapse. The device is somewhat like the box in the Schrödinger's cat experiment, though not (potentially) deadly to anyone inside. At the same time, Stokes is contacted by Erzsebet Karpathy, a Hungarian witch with a supernaturally-extended lifespan who claims to have met Stokes in 1851 London. Stokes learns that D.O.D.O. stands for the Department of Diachronic Operations, and that Lyons intends to build a device that will enable magic-assisted time travel.

Over the next five years, D.O.D.O. grows in size and scope as a project of IARPA and the Director of National Intelligence. Agents are trained in period-specific languages and combat techniques and magically sent back to 1601 London and the 1203-1204 Constantinople, among other times and places. The object is to alter historical events to subtly help the United States government, but it has to be done carefully and methodically to avoid Diachronic Shear, a catastrophic magical explosion that occurs when history is changed too much or too quickly. Witches are recruited to form a time travel network and some are even brought to the present to assist D.O.D.O. directly. One of these witches manages to gain control of the agency through the use of magic, and sends Stokes back in time to July 1851 in the hopes that she will be stranded there when magic ceases to work. The D.O.D.O. organization falls apart as members generally fall into two sides: a conspiracy of witches who want to sabotage the foundations of photography (and science itself) and the protagonists who pledge to counter their efforts.

== Style ==
The Rise and Fall of D.O.D.O. consists of multiple forms of narrative. The core novel is the first-person "Diachronicle" of Melisande Stokes as written in London in July 1851. Her notes are supplemented with journal entries, transcripts, online chat, and other forms of communication. Each is in a different format and font, and many texts are written from the point of view of secondary characters. Some parts are redacted or incomplete. It is explained later that they were secretly (and haphazardly) stolen from D.O.D.O. servers as the organization was collapsing.

== Reception ==
The book was a New York Times bestseller, it entered the hardcover fiction list at number 11.

Kirkus Reviews wrote that the "story gets weirder and more madcap" as it goes, but called the novel "a pleasing combination of much appeal to fans of speculative fiction." Financial Times also praised the wit and "healthy sense of absurdity." Adam Roberts of The Guardian found that much of the humor didn't work, but that "though it's no comic classic, The Rise and Fall of D.O.D.O. is big, roomy and enjoyable."

== Sequel ==
In 2021, Nicole Galland published a sequel named Master of the Revels: A Return to Neal Stephenson's D.O.D.O.
