= Paper Cities =

Book by Ekaterina Sedia

Paper Cities: An Anthology of Urban Fantasy
- Paper Cities first edition cover.
- Author: Ekaterina Sedia (editor)
- Cover artist: Aaron Acevedo
- Language: English
- Genre: Speculative fiction
- Publisher: Senses Five Press
- Publication date: 2008
- Publication place: United States
- Media type: Print (paperback)
- Pages: 271 pp (first edition)
- ISBN: 0-9796246-0-6

Paper Cities: An Anthology of Urban Fantasy is a 2008 speculative fiction anthology edited by Ekaterina Sedia.

== Background ==
Paper Cities: An Anthology of Urban Fantasy was first published in 2008 by Senses Five Press in trade paperback format. It won the 2009 World Fantasy Award for best anthology. It features 21 stories by 21 authors. One of the stories featured in the anthology, Cat Sparks's "Sammarynda Deep", won the 2008 Aurealis Award for best fantasy short story. It was also a short-list nominee for the 2009 Ditmar Award for best short story but lost to Margo Lanagan's "The Goosle" and Dirk Flinthart's "This Is Not My Story".

== Contents ==
- Introduction by Jess Nevins
- "Andretto Walks the King's Way", short story by Forrest Aguirre
- "The Tower of Morning's Bones", short story by Hal Duncan
- "Courting the Lady Scythe", short story by Richard Parks
- "The Bumblety's Marble", short story by Cat Rambo
- "Promises: A Tale of the City Imperishable", short story by Jay Lake
- "Ghost Market", short story by Greg van Eekhout
- "Sammarynda Deep", short story by Cat Sparks
- "Tearjerker", short story by Steve Berman
- "The Title of This Story", short story by Stephanie Campisi
- "The One That Got Away", short story by Mark Teppo
- "Alex and the Toyceivers", short story by Paul Meloy
- "Godivy", short story by Vylar Kaftan
- "Painting Haiti", short story by Michael Jasper
- "The Funeral, Ruined", short story by Ben Peek
- "Down to the Silver Spirits", short story by Kaaron Warren
- "They Would Only be Roads", short story by Darin C. Bradley
- "Taser", short story by Jenn Reese
- "Somnambulist", short story by David J. Schwartz (as David Schwartz)
- "The Age of Fish, Post-Flowers", short story by Anna Tambour
- "The Last Escape", short story by Barth Anderson
- "Palimpsest", short story by Catherynne M. Valente
