= Edmund Tylney =

English courtier

Sir Edmund Tilney or Tylney (1536–1610) was a courtier best known now as Master of the Revels to Queen Elizabeth I and King James VI. He was responsible for the censorship of drama in England. He was also instrumental in the development of English drama of the Elizabethan period. Tilney made the office of Master of the Revels into an institution.

== Early life and family connections ==
Edmund Tilney was the only son of Philip Tilney (d. 1541), Usher of the Privy Chamber to King Henry VIII, and Malyn Chambre. Philip Tilney was a younger son of Sir Philip Tilney of Shelley (d. 1533), treasurer during the Battle of Flodden under the command of Thomas Howard, 2nd Duke of Norfolk. Norfolk's first wife was Sir Philip Tilney's cousin, Elizabeth Tilney, Countess of Surrey; after Elizabeth died in 1497, Norfolk married Sir Philip Tilney's sister, Agnes, later Dowager Duchess of Norfolk.

Edmund Tilney's mother, Malyn Tilney, was implicated in the scandal leading to the downfall of the Duchess's step-granddaughter, Queen Catherine Howard, and was sentenced on 22 December 1541 to life imprisonment and loss of goods, but pardoned after the Queen's execution on 13 February 1542. Edmund Tilney's father was buried on 10 September 1541 in St. Leonard's Church, Streatham. He died in debt, and his widow, Malyn, received a promise of help from the Dowager Duchess of Norfolk.

No record of Tilney's education survives. He evidently learned Latin, French, Italian and Spanish because his early works indicate his acquaintance not only with those languages but also with subjects such as law, history, economics and genealogy. There is speculation that he must have travelled because travel was regarded as a part of one's education at that time.

== Career ==
Though Tilney likely had an informal education, he had a bright future ahead of him because of his royal connections. He was a distant kinsman of Queen Elizabeth by virtue of the familial alliance with the Howards. To obtain royal favour he wrote a treatise called A briefe and pleasant discourse of duties in mariage, called the flower of friendshippe, which was published in 1568. The book was dedicated to the Queen. For the next few years he maintained his connections with the Howard family. In 1572, he represented Gatton, Surrey, in Parliament.

The 2nd Duke of Norfolk's son and grandson held the title of Lord Howard of Effingham consecutively. The second Lord Howard became the Lord Chamberlain in 1574. The Revels Office has always been under the Lord Chamberlain, and he conferred the position of Master on Edmund Tilney. In July 1579, Edmund Tilney formally assumed the office of Master of the Revels though he had been the acting Master since February 1578.

Tilney occupied this position as it underwent a significant change in focus. When he began his work, it consisted principally of planning and conducting royal entertainments, as a unit of the Lord Chamberlain's office. His principal aim was that of pleasing the Queen. Then he started clearing up the various problems associated with the Revels office. It had fallen into major disrepute with creditors. A commission issued on 24 December 1581 solved this financial crisis and enabled him to reduce the maintenance costs of the office to a moderate budget. The second section of the commission was to prohibit the discussion of any controversial issues in theatre. A play would be permitted only if the manuscript had the signature of the Master. Any offender could be imprisoned by Tilney's orders. He was given complete authority in matters concerning drama. This responsibility had been previously shared by Revels officers.

He now became the censor of drama all over the country. One important example is The Book of Sir Thomas More. It concerned the anti-alien riots on the Evil May Day of 1517. Due to its inflammatory political content it was rigidly censored, and the play was never released. Any political content designed to agitate the court was censored.

Tilney's career as Master (1579–1610) spanned some of the most eventful years in the history of English drama. In 1576, The Theatre and The Curtain, the first public playhouses, were built. There were many more being built all over the country at this time. This led to a rapid proliferation of dramatic activity. It began with playwrights such as Christopher Marlowe and Thomas Kyd who were drawing crowds with Tamburlaine and The Spanish Tragedy. The entire career of William Shakespeare, with the exception of a few years, fell within Tilney's tenure of Mastership. The latter licensed thirty of Shakespeare's plays.

But if Tilney's censorship restricted the writers, his support protected them from generally hostile civic authorities. The polite fiction of aristocratic patronage did not obscure the reality that the troupes were commercial enterprises; however, that fiction brought the theatres under royal protection; in 1592, the Lord Mayor of London named Tilney as one of the obstacles to ending public drama in the city. However, Tilney's censorship was not of a generalising nature. While he did omit politically volatile passages and scenes, some, like the deposition scene in Richard II and the murder of Julius Caesar, were allowed to remain. However, there is no way of knowing whether Julius Caesar was allowed to be performed uncensored.

Tilney is also credited with the creation of the Queen's Company of actors. She had received a few players as part of her inheritance. However, Elizabeth never used them and usually asked Tilney to get either children or other companies to perform. Soon it became difficult to arrange for performances according to the court preferences. Some plays proved to be dull and were often cancelled. Just a few years after assuming office, Tilney chose twelve of the best actors from different companies and created the Queen's Men. Soon after this, the Queen's Men played a major part at all court performances. However, they had all but faded by the 1590s.

Tilney brought about another important change in the development of drama by giving priority to the play instead of the masque as part of the entertainment. Masques were very expensive to produce, and Tilney cut down on the Revels' expenses by producing plays. In the succeeding reign of James I, masques made a comeback.

On 24 March 1603, Elizabeth's reign ended and James I ascended the throne. There had been major issues regarding Tilney's patent, as John Lyly had been vying for that post. George Buck, supported by the Howards, was also a contender but Tilney retained his position as the Master even under James I. Also, around 1606, the Master of the Revels was vested with the power of licensing plays for publishing. Some documentary evidence reveals the fact that George Buck had been appointed as acting master. Censorship took on a more relaxed stance with the onset of the Jacobean era. In the following years, Buck licensed many plays, though Tilney controlled and managed the accounts of the office. He stayed in office till his death in 1610.

== Works ==
Edmund Tilney wrote a treatise called A brief and pleasant dis-course of the duties in Marriage, called the Flower of Friendshipp. First published in 1568, it was dedicated to Queen Elizabeth. It is written in the traditional Renaissance genre of the conversazione. He talks about the perfect state of marital love and expounds it with various historical examples. It is an eloquent work of writing and deals with length on the ideal state of marriage between men and women. The treatise reveals an influence of humanist and philosophical ideas.

Topographical Descriptions, Regiments, and Policies is the unpublished diplomatic book that he was preparing. Tilney dedicated his work to King James and spoke about collating notes on different countries. This reference work reveals Tilney's knowledge on varied subjects include topography, genealogy, geography, economics and law.

== Personal life ==
Edmund Tilney lived a life which was spent in balancing one controversy against another. On the one hand he had the Lord Treasurer to contend with, and on the other there was the Lord Chamberlain from whom he took direct orders. Following his appointment as the Master, he grew increasingly popular and married Dame Mary Braye in 1583. She was the fourth wife of Sir Edmund Braye. There are no other details about whether they had any children or not. Even in his will written in 1610, there is no mention of either his wife or any issue.

He spent the latter part of his life fighting various lawsuits and claims over property and debt. Towards the end, his financial circumstances had become severely strained. He lost a few properties through lawsuits as well. In his will he wished to be buried near his father without much pomp and ceremony. He bequeathed money to a few poor parishes, some servants and to his cousin Thomas Tilney. He lived in the town of Leatherhead, Surrey, in the building known as the Mansion House. In December 1997, a new Wetherspoons pub in the town's High Street was named after him. He is buried in St Leonard's Church, Streatham, London. There is a wall-mounted monument to him in the church.

== Ambiguities ==
Though the office of the Master of the Revels was one of the most influential posts in Elizabethan England, there is a paucity of information about the life of Edmund Tilney, the Master who was connected with the development of drama at that time. There have been various sources, most of which have offered erroneous information. Starting from scholars like Malone to Sidney Lee, there has been varied representation of facts on Tilney. There are no details about his issue or what happened to his wife as there was mention of neither in his last will and testament. There are even debates about the possibility of Tilney having been knighted.

== In popular culture ==
- In the 1998 movie Shakespeare in Love, Simon Callow plays Tilney.
- In the 2007 Doctor Who episode "The Shakespeare Code", Chris Larkin plays "Mr. Lynley," Master of the Revels, a reference to Tilney.
- Tilney is one of the primary figures in the 2021 science fiction novel Master of the Revels by Nicole Galland
