= Aloof =

Aloof may refer to:

- The Aloof, a British band
- A fictional race in the novel Incandescence by Greg Egan
