= Dark Integers and Other Stories =

2008 science fiction collection by Greg Egan

- Author: Greg Egan
- Language: English
- Genre: Science fiction, Hard science fiction
- Publisher: Subterranean Press
- Publication date: March 25, 2008
- Pages: 232
- ISBN: 978-1596061552

Dark Integers and Other Stories is a collection of five science-fiction short stories by Australian writer Greg Egan, published on 25 March 2008 by Subterranean Press. One of them, "Oceanic", won the Hugo Award for Best Novella, while two others were nominated.

== Contents ==
- Luminous (1995)
- Riding the Crocodile (2005)
- Dark Integers (2007)
- Glory (2007)
- Oceanic (1998)

== Background ==
"Luminous" and "Dark Integers" are connected with each other. The events of the latter are set ten years after the events of the former. "Riding the Crocodile" is set in the same universe as Egan's novel Incandescence, but the short story is not part of it with the plot being set 300,000 years prior.

== Reception ==
=== Reviews ===
Rich Horton, writing on the SF Site, gets the impression that "this book serves as a good sampling, and as a sort of link between the old Egan and the new." He thinks that it "makes sense to include both older and newer stories", claiming that "the new stories range from solid to excellent", that "the book at hand is strong work, and very welcome" as well as that "it only further whets the appetite for Egan's new novel, Incandescence." In further detail, Horton describes "Luminous" as "fascinating" for its central premise, but says that "it didn't quite sell this idea, and the thrillerish material wasn't convincingly integrated." Its sequel "Dark Integers" concerns "not so much the idea, though that remains fascinatingly loopy, but the sad political reality that Egan derives from the underlying state of affairs." In "Oceanic", "Egan succeeds again in marrying character with idea – perhaps in part because the central idea is more sociological than mathematical."

Writing in Strange Horizons, Karen Burnham discussed suspension of disbelief in regard to multiple of Egan's short stories. Burnham indicated that "Luminous" and "Dark Integers" "aren't necessarily Egan's best stories" as they "both rely heavily on their plots, with very little characterization", and "it's very hard to find a narrative toehold when the infodumping gets confusing". However, she found that "reading the introduction" of Dark Integers and Other Stories makes "them easier to read". She explained, "Then I knew that my feeling of disjointedness wasn't because I was stupid, but because the stories' conceit really was completely without basis in any real-world science or genre convention."

Salik Shah claims in the Reactor Magazine, that the idea behind "Luminous" and "Dark Integers" "would make an exciting premise for radio or film adaptation."

Russell Letson, writing in the Locus Magazine, says that "Oceanic" "edges into extreme post-human and/or far-future territory, but that story’s armature is a kind of bildungsroman" and "is a whole novel’s worth of material that remains background."

=== Awards ===
The collection reached the 6th place in the Reader Poll of the Locus Award in 2009.

"Luminous" was nominated in 1996 and "Dark Integers" was nominated in 2008 for the Hugo Award for Best Novelette. "Oceanic" won the Hugo Award for Best Novella in 1999. In 2001, "Oceanic", in 2003, "Luminous", and in 2010, "Dark Integers", all won the Japanese Seiun Award. "Oceanic" was also a finalist in the 1998 Aurealis Award for best science fiction short story, a long list nominee for the 1999 James Tiptree Jr Memorial Award, and a short-list nominee for the 1999 HOMer Award for best novella.

== See also ==
- 2008 in Australian literature
