= The House of Discarded Dreams =

Book by Ekaterina Sedia

- Author: Ekaterina Sedia
- Cover artist: Audrejs Pidjaas/Fotolia. Design by Sephen H Segal
- Language: English
- Genre: Urban Fantasy Fantasy
- Publisher: Prime Books
- Publication date: November 16, 2010
- Publication place: United States
- Media type: Paperback
- Pages: 301
- ISBN: 978-1-60701-228-3
- Preceded by: The Alchemy of Stone
- Followed by: Heart of Iron

The House of Discarded Dreams is a 2010 fantasy novel by Ekaterina Sedia about a college student who experiences many fairy tales and legends as she finds her place in the world.

== Summary ==
The main character, Vimbai, is an invertebrate zoology college student feeling the pressures of Zimbabwean culture and her overbearing immigrant mother. During a walk on the beach after skipping class, Vimbai finds an ad for a house to rent in the sand dunes. The opportunity comes at the perfect time, and Vimbai decides to leave her parents house to find herself. She moves in with Maya, a bartender in an Atlantic City casino, and Felix, whose life is a mystery. Strange events begin to take place, and it is unclear what is real and what is not. Zimbabwean urban legends appear frequently throughout the novel. Vimbai discovers a psychic energy baby living in the telephone wires, and learns that, instead of hair, Felix has a pocket universe. As if things couldn't get any more strange, Vimbai's dead Zimbabwean grandmother starts doing dishes in the kitchen. Strange beings start moving under the porch, and the house grows and drastically changes to include forests and lakes before it sails off into the ocean. Creatures from African urban legends all but take over as the house gets lost at sea. Vimbai has to find a way back to the real world and turns to horseshoe crabs in the ocean for help in getting home. In order to do so, she finds that she must come to terms with her past...one that only exists in discarded dreams.

== Characters ==
=== Vimbai ===
The main character, Vimbai is a college student of African descent who moves out of her parents' house and into the House of Discarded Dreams.

=== Maya ===
One of Vimbai's two new roommates, Maya is an Atlantic City bartender who adapts well to the house's supernatural transformation.

=== Felix ===
Mysterious roommate to Maya and Vimbai, who has unique hair and knowledge of otherworldly beings.

=== Vimbai's grandmother ===
Vimbai's Zimbabwean grandmother is a ghost Vimbai brought back to the world.

=== Maya's grandmother ===
Maya's grandmother is another spirit returned to the world. She was Maya's only family.

=== PEB ===
PEB, or Physical Energy Baby, is a psychic baby who, in spite of his looks, is an adult. He has a rough voice and many fingers. He is friendly and could be very helpful at times.

=== The Man-Fish ===
The Man-Fish comes from a Zimbabwean myth. In the novel Vimbai has a dream that she becomes a man-fish. The myth explains a boy who goes swimming and drowns, the catfish steals his soul. The catfish then became the Man-Fish, always a catfish at heart but always preying on another body for another soul. There is other Zimbabwe folklore that can relate and even explain the Man-Fish.

=== Balshazaar ===
Balshazaar had lived in Felix's universe until Vimbai, Felix, and Maya took him out and gave him a phantom leg in exchange for information. Balshazaar wants to escape Felix's universe and never return. He then uses the phantom leg to make a deal with the wazimamoto. They drain Felix of his pocket universe in exchange for the souls of the horseshoe crabs.

=== Horseshoe crabs ===
The horseshoe crabs are first introduced when Vimbai is taking a walk on the beach. She comes across a dead crab lying on the sand. This is when we are informed of her love for these invertebrates and also her love for marine biology. She then finds another dead crab but this time a piece of paper was held between its legs. This paper was what led her to Maya, Felix, and the house.

=== Vimbai’s Mother ===
An immigrant from Zimbabwe, she fights with Vimbai's father a lot and doesn't pay mind to Vimbai. She is instead is worried about her job as an Africana Studies professor at the university near their house. She is very stern in her faith and had to fight for everything.

=== Fungai and his uncle ===
He is a skeleton, which means he had a past life as a human. Fungai is a skeleton who drives a very Cadillac painted bubble gum pink and wears a tattered tuxedo. Fungai must feed on human skin in order to survive, or it makes him stronger and healthier. Fungai also has an uncle. Fungai's uncle is a baby with a television as its head.

== Setting ==
The book is set in southern New Jersey, where Vimbai lives with her parents. The book opens with Vimbai attending school where her mother is a professor of African studies. The majority of the book going forward is set in a house in the dunes on a beach, from which point the characters dreams take them and the house out to sea, with stops in places such as West Africa, and the Cooper University Hospital where Vimbai's father works.

== Themes ==
The recurring themes found in Sedia's the House of Discarded Dreams are those of a basic hero's journey. As Booktionary noted, Sedia's novel is about a young woman trying to find herself; it is a novel where both dreams and nightmares come to life; and it ends with the young protagonist, Vimbai, finding strength and confidence in herself, which she has always been searching for. Vimbai is attempting to discover who she is but also struggles with the notion of being stuck between cultures, having strictly raised African parents, and Vimbai being born American, but raised with the two cultures as her influence in life.

=== Culture and folklore ===
Select aspects of the Zimbabwean culture, such as the Shona language and religion, show up in The House of Discarded Dreams. Sedia also employs on the Zimbabwean folkloric character called the wazimamoto, a fire-truck driving vampiric character that is traditionally seen as stealing the "cultural blood" of the people (i.e. destroys their traditional culture). Sedia's portrayal of the wazimamoto differs slightly in the way that the character drives a medical truck and brings its victims to a hospital.

=== Use of historical figures ===
The novel mentions many well-known African and African-American figures. The individuals mentioned are either literary or political figures who have a connection to Africa. Some of the individuals include, Robert Mugabe, Octavia Butler, Amos Tutuola, Fay Chung, and Wangari Maathai. A few others include Malcolm X, Martin Luther King Jr., and Oprah. However, they are not present as characters; rather, Vimbai and Maya name landmarks after them in their new dream-world inside the house.

Mugabe was the first real world individual to be mentioned in this novel. However, unlike the others mentioned, he is not represented as a natural landmark. Robert was first brought up in Chapter 3 during a conversation between Vimabi's parents. They speak of how they highly dislike him and what he has done to their home country of Zimbabwe. Vimabi's mother quotes the head of the Africana Studies who said "Mugabe is the worst thing that ever happened to Zimbabwe." which leads to finding out about how Mugabe is involved in corruption. At the end of chapter 5, Mugabe is brought up again. We then learn that a favorites flower shop in Zimbabwe had been destroyed under the orders of Mugabe.

The rest of the figures in the novel were not included as much as Mugabe was. Unfortunately only 4 of the 10 total figures included in this novel were actually given named landmarks, and the other 6 were just briefly named. The landmarks given include, Malcolm X Mountains, Martin Luther King Forest, Achebe River, and the lake with the catfish in it was named after Marechera. As for the other 6 figures, their landmarks were not given, but it was stated that they would be included in the dream-world. Maya spoke of how she wanted more literary figures, therefore including Octavia Butler, who is an African-American science fiction writer. Sticking with their occurring theme of literary figures, Vimbai says that Amos Tutuola, a Nigerian fantasy writer would be included in their dream-world next. Not only are literary figures included in their dream-world but Vimabi insisted that they included Wangari Maathai, who is a Nobel Peace Prize winner.

== Publishing Information ==
Ekaterina Sedia's novel The House of Discarded Dreams was published by Prime Books and distributed by Diamond Book Distributors.

== Critical reaction ==
Publishers Weekly called it a "quirky, joyous fantasy", criticising plotting but praising Sedia's lyrical style. The Denver Post described it as "a beguiling, surrealistic fantasy wonderfully brought to logic-defying life". Locus magazine noted that the book avoided being simply an allegory of African-American experience by the weight it gave to fantastical elements.
