= The Australian Popular Songbook =

2008 Australian poetry collection by Alan Wearne

- Author: Alan Wearne
- Language: English
- Genre: Poetry collection
- Publisher: Giramondo Publishing
- Publication date: 2008
- Publication place: Australia
- Media type: Print
- Pages: 93 pp.
- Awards: 2008 Grace Leven Prize for Poetry, winner
- ISBN: 9781920882419

The Australian Popular Songbook is a collection of poems by Australian poet Alan Wearne, published by Giramondo Publishing in Australia in 2008.

The collection contains 40 poems from a variety of sources, with some published here for the first time.

This collection is made up of three parts: "'The Australian Popular Songbook', a suite of poems inspired by popular songs from the 1890s through to the 1980s; 'The Metropolitan Poems', a group of stories in verse inspired by suburbs of great moment..; and the poetic monologue 'Breakfast with Darky'." [Publisher's blurb.]

== Contents ==
The Australian Popular Songbook

- "Down Under"
- "It's Time"
- "Saturday Girl"
- "Have You Ever Been to See Kings Cross"
- "Walking the Night Alone"
- "Ciao Baby"
- "Woman You're Breaking Me"
- "Bourke Street on Saturday Night"
- "On the Road to Gundagai"
- "Lime Juice Tub"
- "Bound for South Australia"
- "Bless This House"
- "The Never Never"
- "A Brown Slouch Hat"
- "Girls on the Avenue"
- "My Old Man's a Groovy Old Man"
- "Come on Aussie"
- "Who Listens to the Radio?"
- "The Argonaut's Theme"
- "Bound for Botany Bay"
- "Goodbye Melbourne Town"
- "Old Man Emu"
- "A World of Our Own"
- "Ever Lovin' Man"
- "Brisbane to Beechworth"
- "Just a Suburban Boy"
- "I Go to Rio"
- "Eagle Rock"

The Metropolitan Poems

- "Seventeen Illawarra Couplets"
- "Rose Bay 1959"
- "Sarsaparilla : A Calypso"
- "Chatswood: Ruth Nash Speaks"
- "Neutral Bay"
- "Hurstville"
- "Ascot Vale 1953"
- "'Santamaria's Major "Crime" Was Not to Split the ALP on Religious Grounds but to Split the Catholic Church on Political Grounds.' Discuss."
- "A High School Staff Room Melbourne's Northern Suburbs Winter 1977"
- "Knox City : A Ballad"
- "Poem for Cathy Coleborne"

Breakfast with Darky

- "Breakfast with Darky"

== Critical reception ==
Writing in Australian Book Review David McCooey noted the author's departure from his previous verse novels and commented: "The 'lyrical idiom' of The Australian Popular Songbook is ambiguous at best, offset as it is by Wearne's characteristic attraction to the dramatic monologue, satire, vernacular culture and wrenched syntax." However, McCooey saw these smaller works as a continuation of the poet's "'epic' project by other means." He also commented that using the "trope of popular songs as indices of past times and places is a brilliant one, and one that draws attention to Wearne's great strength as an evoker of milieux."

== Awards ==
- 2008 Grace Leven Prize for Poetry, winner
- 2008 Queensland Premier's Literary Awards — Arts Queensland Judith Wright Calanthe Prize for Poetry, shortlisted
- 2009 New South Wales Premier's Literary Awards, Kenneth Slessor Prize for Poetry, shortlisted

== See also ==
- 2008 in Australian literature
