= Death of Dianne Brimble =

2002 victim of a drug overdose

Dianne Brimble

Dianne Elizabeth Brimble (10 April 1960 – 24 September 2002) died aboard a P&O Cruises cruise ship of a drug overdose. She is alleged to have been neglected and received callous treatment at the hands of passengers, and an inquest ruled she had been given the drug without her knowledge or consent. The investigation into her death has resulted in widespread media coverage in Australia, and criticism of both party culture aboard cruise ships and of the investigation immediately following Brimble's death.

== Brimble's death ==
Brimble, a 42-year-old mother of three from Brisbane, died within 24 hours of boarding the P&O Cruises cruise ship Pacific Sky on 23 September 2002, apparently due to ingesting a combination of alcohol and an overdose of the drug gamma-hydroxybutyrate, otherwise known as "GHB" or "fantasy". According to news reports, security staff on the cruise ship were initially told Brimble had died of a heart attack, but there were suspicious circumstances.

Toxicology reports later revealed that the amount of the sedative drug in her system was three times the amount that a recreational user would have used. Her body was found on the floor of cabin D182, which belonged to four of the men whom she had met at the ship's disco the previous night. Newspaper reports initially gave differing accounts as to whether Brimble was partially clothed or unclothed when she was found dead.

== Inquest ==
Eight men from Adelaide, South Australia, who were travelling companions on the ship had been named by police investigators as "persons of interest" in the case. An inquest was ordered and the eight men, Dragan Losic, Mark Wilhelm, Petar Pantic, Letterio "Leo" Silvestri, Luigi Vitale, Matthew Slade, Ryan Kuchel and Sakelarios "Charlie" Kambouris were subpoenaed to appear.

The inquest began in March 2006. An attempt by Wilhelm's attorney to challenge the inquest was rejected, and Wilhelm was ordered by Deputy State Coroner Jacqueline Milledge to appear when called. Mark Brimble, the ex-husband of Dianne Brimble, represented the family at the inquest and asked questions of witnesses. Other Pacific Sky passengers and personnel had already made statements.

The memory stick from a camera owned by one of the men, "Charlie" Kambouris, which was handed in as lost property, had been stolen by a P&O employee who later turned it over to police once he realized that pictures of Brimble and the men of interest were on it. The camera's memory stick had been reformatted but computer forensic experts were able to retrieve more than 150 deleted pictures from it, and consequently found evidence important to the case. The photographs have not been released to the media because they depict sexual activity and are considered too graphic. Wilhelm claimed that the sex was consensual, and several photographs appear to support this. Other photographs allegedly showed Brimble later, lying naked on the floor of the cabin, having lost control of her bodily functions.

According to several witnesses' testimonies, the men had spent most of the time on the cruise allegedly propositioning a number of female passengers of varying ages. Among numerous acts of alleged sexual harassment were: asking a 15-year-old to do an erotic dance in their cabin for cash, entering the cabin of four girls uninvited, asking if they were going to the disco where they 'could go down on them' and in a later encounter, Silvestri asking one woman if he could perform oral sex on her, among others.

The inquest heard the initial interview that Silvestri had given police in New Caledonia. The interview was conducted two days after Brimble's death. At that time, Silvestri denied any involvement with Brimble. During the interview, however, Silvestri spoke of Brimble in disparaging terms, saying "she smelt, she was black and she was ugly." Silvestri also described her as "desperate", "a yuck-ugly dog" and a "fat thing." Silvestri told the police interviewers that he was angry because Brimble "fucked up his holiday" by dying in his cabin. According to police witness statements, Silvestri allegedly said to another cruise passenger, Allison McKain, that "The bitch is dead, the fucking bitch is dead. Some shit went down last night, some top secret shit," and that a woman had died, naked on the floor of their cabin. Several passengers related how Silvestri had told them that the group had considered throwing Brimble overboard. At least ten passengers saw Brimble, having lost control of her bodily functions, lying unconscious and naked on the cabin floor, including several women Wilhelm specifically invited into the cabin to see her in that state. When the group realised something was wrong they washed and dressed Brimble before calling for help. Later, when medical officers attempted to resuscitate Brimble, Silvestri told the ship's purser to "get the bitch out of my room."

Silvestri told the coronial court that Kuchel told him that Wilhelm had given Brimble the drug, and that she took it willingly with full informed consent. However, Wilhelm had written in a signed statement given to a P&O security chief that he had not given any drugs to anyone. In previous testimony given in March, Counsel assisting the coroner, Ron Hoenig, described Brimble as being "preyed upon" and asserted that she was impaired in such a way that she could not have given informed consent. At the first inquest in March, Hoenig read statements from family and friends of Brimble, citing that she was a "very moral woman" who did not approve of taking drugs or of casual sex. Both Mark Brimble and David Mitchell, her partner of 14 years, gave evidence to the court pertaining to Dianne Brimble's character. However, evidence was tendered by Brimble's doctor that she had recently been prescribed the morning-after pill and had previously had an HIV test following an indiscretion. In addition, the recovered photographs showed Brimble fully conscious having sex with Wilhelm.

Police tapped the telephones of the eight named "men of interest" for six months. Investigators heard nothing incriminating and came to the conclusion that the men did not have the "mongrel instinct" to stick to a fabricated story. However, the men frequently spoke of themselves being the victims, boasted about the media coverage and discussed how to make money from the case, ideas put forward included selling the story to the media, setting up a fee-for-access website and offering to tell police the truth in return for payment.

State Coroner Jacqueline Milledge handed down the findings of the inquest on 30 November 2010. She ruled that Dianne Brimble had been 'unknowingly drugged' for the sexual gratification of others. Milledge said there was evidence to suggest that the drug had been supplied to Wilhelm by Silvestri. She criticised Wilhelm for failing to tell medical staff that Brimble had consumed a drug, denying her the best possible chance of survival. She also said that New South Wales Police withheld material from the inquest, resulting in 'an impasse that was crippling to the inquest'.

== Criminal charges ==
In September 2008, the NSW Director of Public Prosecutions announced that Mark Wilhelm, Letterio Silvestri and Ryan Kuchel would face charges over the circumstances of Brimble's death. Wilhelm was to be charged with manslaughter and supplying a prohibited drug, and Silvestri and Kuchel with perverting the course of justice or, alternatively, to the lesser charge of hindering the investigation.

In October 2009, a Supreme Court trial of Wilhelm ended with the jury unable to reach a verdict.

On 21 April 2010, as a second trial began, Wilhelm pleaded guilty to an alternative charge to manslaughter, saying that he had caused Brimble to take the drug. However, in an unusual move, Justice Howie refused to accept the plea saying, "I cannot allow him to plead guilty to a matter he did not commit, and he did not commit this." Shortly after, Crown Prosecutor Terry Thorpe withdrew the charge of manslaughter against Wilhelm.

Justice Howie said he wholly supported the decision to drop the charges because there was no evidence to support the charge. The judge said that the majority of the public believed that Wilhelm should be held responsible for Brimble's death, but that their view had been coloured by prejudice and hysteria. He said that the coronial inquest had been unfortunate because it allowed a great deal of irrelevant material to be exposed to the media. "Mr Wilhelm had no basis to believe that he was in any way putting Ms Brimble's life at risk," he said. "She was an adult who, on the evidence, voluntarily took the drug knowing what it was. She didn't think it would harm her, neither did Mr Wilhelm." Wilhelm pleaded guilty to the far lesser charge of supplying a prohibited drug.

The judge then recorded a "no conviction" and applied no penalty, for the charge of supplying, stating "It's a significant punishment he has already suffered. ... I am entitled to take into account not only the years of public humiliation of the offender but also the consequences of that on him and his mental health." For hindering the investigation, Kuchel was given an 18-month good behaviour bond while Silvestri was given a 15-month bond.

== Aftermath ==
The Brimble family was able to reach a settlement with P&O for, "a reasonable amount of money".

Brimble's family revealed the anguish of Brimble's drug-induced death aboard the Pacific Sky in interviews aired on Australian Story on ABC TV.

The case has prompted stricter security measures for Australian cruises with the introduction of security sniffer dogs and closed-circuit surveillance cameras throughout ships in the fleet.

The case also allegedly inspired the 2008 play Cruising.

Wilhelm, Slade and Kuchel are believed to have distanced themselves from the other five men who have remained close friends. On 8 October 2010, Losic, Kambouris, Vitale, Pantic, and their partners and friends met for dinner at an Adelaide restaurant. The gathering was photographed by the media and a story ran the next day claiming that the dinner was being held to mark the eighth anniversary of Brimble's death (21 September 2002). The men were criticised by the media, who reported the event in a three-page editorial. A separate opinion piece condemned the men's insensitivity in holding a dinner on the anniversary and questioned their lack of shame over the events of 2002. Losic's wife insisted the dinner was for a friend's birthday but she declined to name the friend. Brimble's family declined to comment on the dinner, stating they would "leave it up to the public to make up their minds who and what they are."

== Timeline ==
- Monday, 23 September 2002 — at approximately 1700 in Sydney, Australia, Dianne Brimble boards the Pacific Sky cruise ship for a 10-day/9-night cruise to Nouméa, New Caledonia, and Vanuatu. She is accompanied by her sister, her daughter, and her niece. The eight "persons of interest" arrive and are photographed together before they board the ship. This photo was widely published by the media after Brimble was identified in the background boarding the ship. A total of 1500 passengers are on board.
- Tuesday, 24 September 2002 — at about 0400, Brimble is seen leaving the ship's disco with four of the eight "men of interest." At approximately 0830, the ship's emergency paramedics are called to cabin D182 when attempts by two of the men to revive Brimble fail. At 0903 she is pronounced dead.
- Thursday, 26 September 2002 — Detectives board the ship while in port in Nouméa and begin questioning various witnesses. While Brimble's cabin was sealed for further investigation. the cabin where she was found was not. The four occupants, Wilhelm, Slade, Kuchel and Silvestri, are moved to another cabin and are allowed to remove their belongings. The cabin is then cleaned. Brimble's body is removed from the ship and transported back to Australia. Her family members also disembark.
- Friday, 4 October 2002 — Brimble's funeral is held in Brisbane. More than 250 people attend, including her former husband, Mark Brimble, and her partner, David Mitchell.
- 9 March 2006 — The inquest into her death opens at Glebe Coroners Court in Sydney. Statements are given by friends and family of Brimble, and by Pacific Sky passengers and crew.
- 16 June 2006 — Letterio "Leo" Silvestri is the first of the "persons of interest" to take the stand at Glebe Coroners Court.
- 25 June 2006 — Mark Brimble, Brimble's former husband, becomes the Australian representative for the US-based group International Cruise Victims Organization.
- 28 July 2006 — Ryan Kuchel, the second "person of interest", testifies before the coroner.
- 11 September 2006 — The inquest resumes. Betty Wood and Alma Wood, Brimble's mother and sister, fly in from Brisbane to attend the inquest. Ryan Kuchel continues to give evidence, as do several members of P&O's security staff. During the week, Petar Pantic and Dragan Losic also testify. Upon finishing his testimony, Pantic formally apologises to Brimble's family.
- 6 November 2006 — The inquest resumes. Evidence is given by Dragan Losic, crew members and other witnesses. Brimble's family accuse police of covering up evidence.
- 16 February 2007 — The counsel assisting the inquest, Ron Hoenig, suggests to the coroner that Leo Silvestri and Mark Wilhelm could be charged with murder over Brimble's death.
- 22 February 2007 — P&O's chief executive, Peter Ratcliffe, apologises to the Brimble family for the company's failure to handle the situation properly following the Brimble's death. P&O offers a substantial payment to the family.
- 9 July 2007 — The inquest resumes.
- 10 July 2007 — Testimony is given by Luigi Vitale. He says he had never met Brimble, and does not believe her death was suspicious. He says he has no memory of the events leading up to her death.
- 13 July 2007 — Testimony is given by Matthew Slade. He sets himself apart from the other seven persons of interest, referring to them as "wankers" and "idiots." He says he had received death threats regarding the case, as had another of the persons of interest, Mark Wilhelm.
- 26 July 2007 — The coroner ends the inquest, saying there is enough evidence capable of satisfying a jury that "known persons" had committed indictable offences. Counsel assisting the inquest, Ron Hoenig, said there was enough evidence to conclude that two unnamed people had committed an indictable offence. Hoenig said that possible charges could relate to supplying a person with a drug and to not rendering a person assistance. The case is referred to the Director of Public Prosecutions. In previous days, the inquest heard secretly recorded telephone conversations in which several of the men of interest joke and make derogatory statements about Brimble, including claims that she "was no angel". Some discussed the possibility of selling their stories to the police and the media for millions of dollars. The last of the men of interest to take the stand, Mark Wilhelm, elects to exercise the right to remain silent during the inquest.
- 6 December 2007 — Petar Pantic, one of the persons of interest in Dianne Brimble's murder, flees Australia with a one-way ticket to Serbia. He was discovered to have fled when police tried to serve an arrest warrant on him in relation to the importation of prohibited zoophilia pornography. He returned to Australia in 2009 and was fined $5,000 for the offence.
- 11 September 2008 — The NSW Director of Public Prosecutions recommends that Mark Wilhelm be charged with manslaughter and supplying fantasy, and that Letterio "Leo" Silvestri and Ryan Kuchel be charged with perverting the course of justice.
- 19 February 2009 — A date is set for the trial of three of the persons of interest.
- 23 June 2009 — Ryan Kuchel pleads guilty in court to one count of concealing a serious offence. His lawyers ask for the matter to be dealt with immediately because Kuchel is now living in Dubai. Kuchel is sentenced to be of good behaviour for 18 months.
- 29 June 2009 — Letterio "Leo" Silvestri pleads guilty to concealing a serious indictable offence. He is later sentenced to 15 months in jail, with the sentence suspended due to his guilty plea and because he had agreed to give evidence at the trial of the man alleged to have given Brimble the drug.
- 21 April 2010 — The manslaughter charge against Mark Wilhelm is dropped and he pleads guilty to supplying Ms Brimble with the drug GHB. Supreme Court Justice Roderick Howie says that if Wilhelm was responsible for Mrs Brimble's death, it was only in a moral or "technical" way, and that there is doubt whether he is criminally responsible. The judge later recorded a conviction against Wilhelm, but did not impose any punishment on the basis that Wilhlem had suffered years of public humiliation and severe mental illness since Dianne Brimble's death, and that no punishment the judge could give would be anything like the punishment Wilhelm had suffered since the incident.
