= Master of the Revels: A Return to Neal Stephenson's D.O.D.O. =

2021 novel by Nicole Galland

- Author: Nicole Galland
- Language: English
- Series: D.O.D.O.
- Release number: 2
- Genre: Science Fiction, Time Travel
- Publication date: 23 Feb 2021
- Publication place: United States
- Pages: 560 (Hardcover)
- ISBN: 978-0-06-284489-7
- Preceded by: The Rise and Fall of D.O.D.O.
- Website: Harper Collins

Master of the Revels: A Return to Neal Stephenson's D.O.D.O. is a 2021 science fiction time travel novel by Nicole Galland. It is a sequel to The Rise and Fall of D.O.D.O., which was co-authored by Neal Stephenson and Galland. The novel follows the story of Gráinne, a witch who plots to change history, and a group of rogue operatives who try to stop her.

== Plot ==
The witch Gráinne attempts to go back in time and reverse the rise of technology. This will allow magic to flourish in the present day. Melisande Stokes, Tristan Lyons, and their companions attempt to stop her.

In 4th century Sicily, a young witch named Livia has commissioned a mural for her estate. Gráinne attempts to change the mural from a scene of the Nine Muses to an astronomical scene, which will eventually lead to a change in position of the Koenigsberg Observatory. Melisande befriends Livia and thwarts Gráinne's plans.

In 14th century Florence, Gráinne hopes to free a slave girl named Dana to prevent her descendent Leonardo da Vinci from being born. In the original timeline, Dana is raped and impregnated by her masters, eventually leading to the birth of Leonardo da Vinci. Gráinne wants Dana to be rescued; Melisande wants to leave Dana as a captive in order to prevent history from changing. D.O.D.O. operative Chira Lajani eventually finds a way to rescue Dana and bring her to safety in a nearby farm, allowing her descendants to be born without leaving Dana in slavery.

In 15th century Kyoto, Frank Oda investigates a shrine that has been manipulated by Gráinne. She kills him there; despite many attempts, Melisande’s group is not able to rescue him.

Gráinne’s most ambitious plot involves a scheme to change the words of Macbeth to include a real magical spell. Tristan is sent back to Jacobean England to stop Gráinne, but he is apparently killed at the Globe Theater. Tristan’s sister Robin is an actress specializing in the Shakespearean era. She is sent back to London to prevent Tristan’s murder. Disguised as a man, Robin befriends William and Edmund Shakespeare. Gráinne has convinced Edmund Tilney, the Master of the Revels, to edit the lines in Macbeth. Robin, William, and Edmund perform as the witches in Macbeth as it premiers for King James and Queen Anne. They recite Shakespeare’s original lines, defeating Gráinne. Gráinne kills Tristan at Whitehall Palace in Robin’s strand. The witch Lady Emilia Lanier helps Robin to save Tristan from being murdered at the Globe Theater in another strand. Even though this is not the original Tristan, their timelines are similar enough that he is able to adjust well and return to the present with Robin.

Despite her defeats, Gráinne vows to continue her schemes to destroy technology.

== Reception ==
Publishers Weekly gave the novel a positive review, noting that the author's "careful attention to everyday life in various time periods creates verisimilitude, as does the assortment of found documents through which the tale is presented." Jackie Drohan of the Historical Novel Society writes that the novel "boasts a dizzying array of historical as well as fictional characters", calling it "delightful to true fans of both history and fantasy". The review praised the novel's usage of epistolary formatting and fast pace. Larissa Irankunda writes that Galland "masterfully managed to create an entirely new story that breathed life into new potential mythos and fantasies" and praised Galland's ability to "[take] the reins from Neal Stephenson" for this sequel.
