= Riding the Crocodile =

2005 novella by Greg Egan

- Short story by Greg Egan
- Country: Australia
- Language: English
- Genre: Science fiction

Publication
- Published in: One Million A.D.
- Publication date: December 2005

"Riding the Crocodile" is a science-fiction novella by Australian writer Greg Egan, first published in One Million A.D. edited by Gardner Dozois in December 2005. The novella was included in the collections Dark Integers and Other Stories in 2008 and Oceanic in 2009. The short story is set in the same universe as Egan's short stories "Glory" and "Hot Rock" as well as Egan's novel Incandescence.

== Plot ==
For millions of years, an alien civilization known as the Aloof living in the core of the galaxy have kept a strict isolation. Any attempts to communicate have been ignored and any non-sentient probes sent into their territory have been shut down and sent back decades later. Leila and Jasim, after having been married for more than ten thousand years and, voluntarily having chosen death, want to start another attempt for contact and travel through the communication network of an alien civilization known as Amalgam from their home planet Najib to the planet Nazdeek. More than ten thousand additional years are spent mostly unconscious for this journey, hence their children and grandchildren have probably already chosen death. Leila enters the network of the Aloof and is allowed to pass through the core of the galaxy. Every attempt to communicate is still ignored and Leila realizes, that surely none of her arguments regarding cooperation have already been thought through by the Aloof. Leila finally accepts their isolation, but assures them, that others will nonetheless continue to investigate them for a better understanding since that is simply their nature.

== Reception ==
=== Reviews ===
Rich Horton writes on the SF Site, that "the portrayal of the far future posthuman culture is intriguing, and the notion of the Aloof comes off pretty well, but never did I quite care."

Karen Burnham writes in Greg Egan (Modern Masters of Science Fiction) about "Riding the Crocodile", "Glory" and Incandescence, that "the real challenge is coping with the ennui of immortality" and that "his characters tend to do this by maintaining a spirit of scientific inquiry".

=== Awards ===
The novelette was a Locus Award Nominee for Best SF Novelette in 2007 and reached the 12th place.

== Literature ==
- Burnham, Karen (2014). Greg Egan (Modern Masters of Science Fiction). Modern Masters of Science Fiction. University of Illinois Press (published 2014-04-03). ISBN 978-0252038419.
