= Luminous (short story) =

1995 short story by Greg Egan

- Short story by Greg Egan
- Country: Australia
- Language: English
- Genre: Science fiction

Publication
- Published in: Asimov's Science Fiction
- Publication type: Periodical
- Media type: Print
- Publication date: September 1995

"Luminous" is a science-fiction short story by Australian writer Greg Egan, first published in Asimov’s Science Fiction in September 1995.

The short story was included in the collections Luminous in 1998, Dark Integers and Other Stories in 2008, and The Best of Greg Egan in 2020. It was nominated for the Hugo Award for Best Novelette in 1996. It has a sequel, the short story "Dark Integers".

== Plot ==
Bruno and Alison, who made her PhD under the supervision of Yuen Fu-ting at Fu-tan university in China, discuss about arithmetics and the relation of mathematical truth to the physical world. Alison insists that there needs to be a manifestation of theorems by either thought or computation, which would imply them being correct only to spread with the speed of light. She underlines this point of view with a statement about very high integers, which after 423 steps implies its opposite and hence yields a contradiction within arithmetic. Luminous, a computer only based on the interaction of light with itself, carries out these 423 steps and then begins to map out an island of theorems belonging to the far side of mathematics. Bruno suspects the anomaly to have formed from certain combinations in the quark–gluon plasma after the Big Bang. Yuen Ting-fu orders Alison to carry out computations to destroy the far side, when a large spike appears and gets manifested by them gaining an understanding of the arithmetics of the far side. They discuss about the aliens responsible and the possibility, that if their attack indeed only spread with the speed of light, they must exist on Earth in a form invisible to them due to their different mathematics. But their new insight in it might shed light on this new world.

== Translation ==
The short story was translated into German (1996), French (1998), Italian (2001), Japanese (2002) and Spanish (2010).

== Reception ==
=== Reviews ===
Writing in Strange Horizons, Karen Burnham discussed suspension of disbelief in regard to multiple of Egan's short stories. Burnham indicated that "Luminous" and "Dark Integers" "aren't necessarily Egan's best stories" as they "both rely heavily on their plots, with very little characterization", and "it's very hard to find a narrative toehold when the infodumping gets confusing". However, they found that "reading the introduction" of Dark Integers and Other Stories makes "them easier to read". She explained, "Then I knew that my feeling of disjointedness wasn't because I was stupid, but because the stories' conceit really was completely without basis in any real-world science or genre convention."

Rich Horton, writing on the SF Site, referred to the story's central premise as "fascinating" but stated that "it didn't quite sell this idea, and the thrillerish material wasn't convincingly integrated."

In the Reactor Magazine, Salik Shah claimed the short story (together with its sequel "Dark Integers") "would make an exciting premise for radio or film adaptation."

=== Awards ===
"Luminous" was nominated for the Hugo Award for Best Novelette in 1996 and won the Japanese Seiun Award in 2003. It reached the 12th in the Reader Poll of the Locus Award in 1996.

== See also ==
- Division by Zero, short story by Ted Chiang about an inconsistency in arithmetics
