= Glory (novelette) =

2007 novelette by Greg Egan

- Short story by Greg Egan
- Country: Australia
- Language: English
- Genre: Science fiction

Publication
- Published in: The New Space Opera
- Publication date: 2007

"Glory" is a science-fiction novelette by Australian writer Greg Egan, first published in the anthology The New Space Opera edited by Gardner Dozois and Jonathan Strahan in 2007. The novelette was included in the collections Dark Integers and Other Stories in 2008 and Oceanic in 2009. The novelette is set in the same universe as Egan's novellas "Riding the Crocodile" and "Hot Rock" as well as Egan's novel Incandescence.

== Plot ==
Joan and Anne transfer their consciousness into alien Noudah bodies to visit their world and mediate between the rivaling factions of Tira and Ghahar as well as research their history. Their world is closest to the sun in a system with five planets, while Joan and Anne spy the conversation from Baneth, the moon of the gas giant in the system. Using a signal from a node in the communication network of the Amalgam, an advance alien race, sent from twenty light-years away, Joan and Anne can prove to the Noudah to be alien visitors. Together they engage in archaeological excavation to search for pottery shards of the extinct fraction of Niah and find a mathematical theorem in the form of a commutative diagram drawn as a seven-dimensional hypercube, which is then transmitted into space. Subsequently, the conflict between the Tira and Ghahar ends and they intend to work together to reach the black hole, which is visible from their world because of its accretion disk also known as glory.

== Reception ==
=== Reviews ===
Rich Horton writes on the SF Site, that the short story "opens with a spectacular hard SF coup", which is "all interesting enough, and well executed, but again it didn't quite ignite my imagination."

Karen Burnham writes in Greg Egan (Modern Masters of Science Fiction) about "Riding the Crocodile", "Glory" and Incandescence, that "the real challenge is coping with the ennui of immortality" and that "his characters tend to do this by maintaining a spirit of scientific inquiry". In particular concerning "Glory", she calls it "perhaps even more emphatic" compared to Egan's novel Distress.

=== Awards ===
The novelette was a finalist for the Hugo Award for Best Novelette in 2008 and was a Locus Award Nominee for Best SF Novelette in 2008 and reached the 12th place.

== Literature ==
- Burnham, Karen (2014). Greg Egan (Modern Masters of Science Fiction). Modern Masters of Science Fiction. University of Illinois Press (published 2014-04-03). ISBN 978-0252038419.
