= Dark Integers =

2007 short story by Greg Egan

- Short story by Greg Egan
- Country: Australia
- Language: English
- Genre: Science fiction

Publication
- Published in: Asimov's Science Fiction
- Publication type: Periodical
- Media type: Print
- Publication date: October/November 2007

"Dark Integers" is a science-fiction short story by Australian writer Greg Egan, first published in Asimov's Science Fiction in October/November 2007. The short story was included in the collections Dark Integers and Other Stories in 2008, Oceanic in 2009 and The Best of Greg Egan in 2020. It was nominated for the Hugo Award for Best Novelette in 2008. It is a sequel to the short story "Luminous".

== Plot ==
Ten days after the far side of mathematics launched its counterattack, Bruno Costanzo and Alison Tierney make contact with the alien being responsible, which they call Sam. They begin to exchange insights about their sides and try to hold up the peace between them, but can only see each other as digital icons. Sam hints that other worlds and alien life are a lot more common on the far side, but hesitates to reveal as much as Bruno and Alison. Ten years later, Bruno learns about a new theory by Tim Campbell, which involves the connection of certain integers with their manifestation in the universe. He calls them dark integers in analogy to dark matter and dark energy as they are also invisible but with measurable effect. His calculations landed directly in the far side, so Bruno has to convince Sam that no attack took place and later bugs Campbell's computer to avoid a future incident. Campbell finds out and confronts Bruno, who then tells him about the far side, which had been kept secret by him, Alison and Yuen Fu-ting. Campbell begins to map out the nearest system on the far side, revealing that it's not mirroring the Solar System and also moving relatively to it. Because of the quick attack ten years ago, an alien spaceship probably followed the Earth's position on the far side, hinting that the aliens knew about the other side way longer than them. While on a hike with his wife Kate, an attack from the far side begins. Planes and trains begin to crash, killing five thousand people in total. While Alison and Yuen Fu-ting launch a counterattack, Bruno speaks with Sam, who claims to not have started the attack. They devise a plan to separate a component of the far side and smooth out the border between the sides to render them immune to further attacks. Bruno returns to Kate and begins to tell her the story behind the attack, for which the public believes a computer virus to be responsible, and assures her, that although the story starts with Alison, it ends with her.

== Translation ==
The short story was translated in Japanese (2009), French (2009) and Italian (2021).

== Reception ==
=== Reviews ===
Karen Burnham, writing in Strange Horizons about suspension of disbelief discussed with multiple of Egan's short stories, says that "Luminous" and "Dark Integers" "aren't necessarily Egan's best stories" as they "both rely heavily on their plots, with very little characterization" and "it's very hard to find a narrative toehold when the infodumping gets confusing". But "reading the introduction" (of Dark Integers and Other Stories of which the essential part is included in the review) makes "them easier to read". She argues: "Then I knew that my feeling of disjointedness wasn't because I was stupid, but because the stories' conceit really was completely without basis in any real-world science or genre convention."

Rich Horton, writing on the SF Site, claims the short story concerns "not so much the idea, though that remains fascinatingly loopy, but the sad political reality that Egan derives from the underlying state of affairs."

Salik Shah claims in the Reactor Magazine, that the short story (together with its prequel "Luminous") "would make an exciting premise for radio or film adaptation."

=== Awards ===
The short story was nominated for the Hugo Award for Best Novelette in 2008 and won the Japanese Seiun Award in 2010. It reached the 3rd place in the Reader Poll of the Locus Award in 2008 and won Asimov's Reader Poll.

== See also ==
- Division by Zero, short story by Ted Chiang about an inconsistency in arithmetics
