= Division by Zero (short story) =

1991 short story by Ted Chiang

- Short story by Ted Chiang
- Country: United States
- Language: English
- Genre: Science fiction

Publication
- Published in: Full Spectrum 3
- Publication type: Anthology
- Publisher: Bantam Spectra
- Publication date: 1 May 1991

"Division by Zero" is a science fiction short story by American author Ted Chiang, initially published in 1991 in Full Spectrum 3 magazine and subsequently republished in the 2002 Ted Chiang collection Stories of Your Life and Others.

== Plot ==
Renee, an intellectually gifted mathematician and professor, inadvertently proves arithmetic inconsistent. The discovery causes her great mental anguish, as she can no longer find mathematics intuitively meaningful. Her husband, Carl, is initially sympathetic but finds himself unable to empathize. The stress of her discovery eventually drives Renee to attempt suicide, which Carl prevents. While Renee recovers in a psychiatric ward, Carl realizes he has fallen out of love with her and resolves to end their relationship. The story ends mid-conversation, wherein a grateful Renee, recently released from the ward, attempts to explain her breakdown to a somber Carl.

== See also ==
- Division by zero
- Infinity
- Luminous and Dark Integers, short stories by Greg Egan about an inconsistency in arithmetics
- Zero
