= The Running Man (Bauer novel) =

2004 young adult novel by Michael Gerard Bauer

- Author: Michael Gerard Bauer
- Language: English
- Genre: Young adult fiction
- Publisher: Omnibus Books
- Publication date: January 2004
- Publication place: Australia
- Media type: Print (Paperback)
- Pages: 280 pp
- ISBN: 1-86291-575-X
- OCLC: 60836784
- LC Class: PZ7.B32623 Ru 2004

The Running Man is a 2004 young adult novel by Australian author Michael Gerard Bauer. It was the 2005 CBCA Book of the Year for Older Readers, and also won the Courier Mail 2005 People's Choice Award for Younger Readers.

== Awards and recognition ==
The Running Man was named Children's Book Council of Australia Book of the Year for Older Readers in 2005. It also won the Courier Mail 2006 People's Choice Award for Younger Readers, was listed as one of the top 10 books for young adults for 2004 in Magpies magazine and was short-listed for the 2006 NSW Premier's Award and Victorian Premier's Award and the 2006 South Australian Festival Awards for Literature.
