= Nicole Galland =

American novelist

Nicole Galland is an American novelist, initially known for her historical fiction. She has written The Rise and Fall of D.O.D.O. in collaboration with Neal Stephenson. She wrote the contemporary comedic novel Stepdog. Under the name E.D. deBirmingham she wrote Siege Perilous, the fifth novel of the Mongoliad cycle.

== Biography ==
Galland was born in New York, but grew up in West Tisbury, Massachusetts, a farming community on the island of Martha's Vineyard. Her maternal family have roots there going back to the 18th century. Her mother works as a nurse and her stepfather, a Vietnam vet, was a Physician's Assistant at Martha's Vineyard only hospital. On her father's side, she is first generation American, her heritage being a combination of German Jew and Iraqi-Kurdish Jew.

She graduated from Martha's Vineyard Regional High School as valedictorian of her class, before going on to study theatre and earn an honors degree in Comparative Religion at Harvard University, with a focus in Buddhism. Galland spent her 20s and 30s working in theatre, teaching, editing and juggling odd jobs. These included co-founding a teen theater company in California that debuted at the Edinburgh Fringe Festival in Scotland. Galland once described her life as existing at the whim of serendipity.

Her screenplay, The Winter Population, won an award in 1998; it has yet to be produced. When her first novel, The Fool’s Tale, was published by William Morrow in 2005, she left her position as Literary Manager/Dramaturge at Berkeley Repertory Theatre to write full-time. While at Berkeley Rep she had written her second novel, Revenge of the Rose. Her third novel, Crossed: A Tale of the Fourth Crusade, was written over a two-year period during which she lived out of a backpack.

Having resided in the California Bay Area, Los Angeles and New York City, Galland returned to Martha's Vineyard to live full-time.

In addition to her novels, Galland has written for Salon.com and several Vineyard-based publications, including the Vineyard Gazette, Martha’s Vineyard Magazine, and Edible Vineyard, of which she is a contributing editor.

She has been involved in Vineyard theatre, working at the Vineyard Playhouse and with ArtFarm Enterprises. She is also the co-founder, with Chelsea McCarthy, of Shakespeare for the Masses, an off-season series presenting irreverent adaptations Shakespeare's plays on Martha's Vineyard.

Galland appears in the CD-ROM Star Wars: Rebel Assault II as Ina Rece. She has studied aikido.

== Bibliography ==
- The Fool’s Tale (2005, William Morrow; translated into Spanish)
- Revenge of the Rose (2006, William Morrow; translated into four languages)
- Crossed: A Tale of the Fourth Crusade (2008, Harper Perennial)
- Moby Rich (2007–2008, serialized novel in the Vineyard Gazette)
- The Mongoliad (launched 2010)
- I, Iago (April 2012, William Morrow)
- Godiva (July 2013, William Morrow)
- Stepdog (August 2015, Harper Collins)
- The Rise and Fall of D.O.D.O. with Neal Stephenson (June 2017, William Morrow)
- Master of the Revels: A Return to Neal Stephenson's D.O.D.O. (February 2021, William Morrow)
- Boy: A Novel (February 2025, HarperCollins)
