= A Beautiful Place to Die =

2008 novel by Malla Nunn

- First edition
- Author: Malla Nunn
- Language: English
- Genre: Mystery novel
- Publication date: 1 Sep 2008
- Publication place: Australia
- Media type: Print (hardback)
- Pages: 384 pp
- ISBN: 978-1-4165-8620-3
- OCLC: 209702892
- Dewey Decimal: 823/.92 22
- LC Class: PR9619.4.N86 B43 2009

A Beautiful Place to Die is the debut novel of award-winning filmmaker Malla Nunn. It was a recipient of the 2009 Davitt Award.

== Characters in A Beautiful Place to Die ==
Det. Emmanuel Cooper is the main character in the book. Chris Nashawaty describes the character as "an English WWII veteran who emigrated to Johannesburg in the early '50s, a toxic time when the country's racial divisions couldn't have been more black-and-white. He's a stranger in a strange land, not only because he doesn't use skin color to determine guilt or innocence but also because he barely understands just how deep these fault lines go."

== Major themes ==
Kirkus Reviews explains that race "is a major issue in the narrative; Afrikaners and people of color eye each other warily owing to the recent advent of laws that prescribe how whites and blacks can and can't interact....The author sets his story in Jacob's Rest, a small village with rigid racial distinctions."

== Literary significance and reception ==
Publishers Weekly compares the book to Charles Todd's Inspector Rutledge series and calls it "a welcome addition to crime fiction set in South Africa." USA Today declares the book "a great beginning to a series that mixes crime-solving with South African history." Graeme Blundell praises the book as "lovely" and commends Nunn for setting "her characters brilliantly within a complex psychological portrayal of a particular time and place." Jay strafford writes that the book "will long echo in your mind" and that "Nunn brings this entirely plausible work to a close and leaves the reader eager for the next case facing her winning, troubled protagonist." Nashawaty writes that "as a character, Cooper's no Sam Spade or Philip Marlowe. He feels sketchy, half-drawn--not quite alive yet. Next time out, we'll need...more cluses about what makes this new sleuth tick." Nevertheless, Nasawaty still gives the book a B overall. Sarah Weinman writes, "Nunn teases out a complex tale of sexual depravity and family members prepared to protect even the worst of secrets in beautifully layered prose, but what makes A Beautiful Place to Die a debut to savor is the interplay between the cusp of social change and how then-socially accepted values seem monstrous to the modern reader."

== Publication history ==
- 2008, Australia, Pan Macmillan, ISBN 978-1-4050-3877-5, Pap date 1 September 2008
- 2009, United States of America, Atria ISBN 978-1-4165-8620-3, Pub date 6 January 2009
