= Alan Wearne =

Australian poet and creative writing educator

- Born: Alan Richard Wearne; 23 July 1948 (age 78); Melbourne, Victoria, Australia
- Education: Monash University
- Occupations: Poet, lecturer
- Writing career
- Pen name: Walker Norris
- Period: 1971–present

Alan Wearne (born 23 July 1948) is an Australian poet.

== Early life and education ==
Alan Wearne was born on 23 July 1948 and grew up in Melbourne. He studied history at Monash University, where he met the poets Laurie Duggan and John A. Scott. He was involved in the Poets Union.

== Career ==
After publishing two collections of poetry, he wrote a verse novel, The Nightmarkets (1986), which won the Australian Book Council Banjo Award and was adapted for performance with Monash University Student Theatre.

His next book in the same genre, The Lovemakers, won the Kenneth Slessor Prize for Poetry and the NSW Premier's Book of the Year in 2002, as well as the Arts Queensland Judith Wright Calanthe Award. The first half of the novel was published by Penguin, and its second by the ABC in 2004 as The Lovemakers: Book Two, Money and Nothing and co-won The Foundation for Australian Literary Studies' Colin Roderick Award and the H. T. Priestly Medal. Despite this critical success neither book was promoted properly and both volumes ended up being pulped. Shearsman Press in the UK has since republished the book in a single volume.

These Things Are Real was published in 2017 by Giramondo Publishing.

Wearne lectured in Creative Writing at the University of Wollongong until 2016.

== Books ==
- Public Relations (1972)
- New Devil, New Parish (1976)
- The Nightmarkets (Penguin, 1986) ISBN 0-14-007586-0
- Out Here (Newcastle upon Tyne : Bloodaxe Books 1987) ISBN 0-906427-72-X
- Kicking In Danger (Black Pepper 1997) ISBN 1-876044-20-9 review
- The Lovemakers: Book One, Saying All The Great Sexy Things (Penguin, 2001) ISBN 0-14-024541-3
- The Lovemakers: Book Two, Money and Nothing (ABC, 2004) ISBN 0-7333-1359-0 review review
- Sarsaparilla A Calypso (Polar Bear Press, 2007)
- The Australian Popular Songbook (Giramondo 2008) ISBN 978-1-920882-41-9
- Prepare the Cabin for Landing (Giramondo 2012) ISBN 9781920882945
- These Things Are Real (Giramondo 2017) ISBN 978-1-925336-32-0
