= The Mongoliad =

Fictional narrative by Neal Stephenson and Greg Bear

- Application splash screen for The Mongoliad
- Author: Neal Stephenson; Greg Bear
- Language: English
- Subject: Middle Ages, Mongol Empire
- Publisher: Subutai Corporation
- Publication date: 2010
- Publication place: United States
- Media type: Smartphone, Web, Print
- ISBN: 978-1-61218-236-0 (paperback)
- OCLC: 764354919

The Mongoliad is a collaborative work of transmedia historical adventure fiction by a group known as the Subutai Corporation which was founded by Neal Stephenson and others. Set in the Foreworld Saga, the story was originally released in a serialized format online, and via a series of iOS and Android apps from 2010 until 2012. It was restructured and re-edited for a definitive edition published by 47North in multiple volumes in 2012 as The Mongoliad. Fan-submitted Foreworld stories were published via Amazon's Kindle Worlds imprint starting in 2013.

== Collaborators and format ==
The serialized edition was intended to be distributed primarily as a series of applications ("apps") for smartphones, which the Subutai Corporation viewed as a new model for publishing storytelling. At the project's core is a narrative of adventure fiction following the exploits of a small group of fighters and mystics in medieval Europe around the time of the Mongol conquests. As well as speculative fiction authors Neal Stephenson (chairman of Subutai), Greg Bear, Nicole Galland, Mark Teppo and others, collaborators include filmmakers, computer programmers, graphic artists, martial artists and combat choreographers, video game designers, and a professional editor. In a departure from conventional fiction, much of the content of The Mongoliad was in forms other than text, not bound to any single medium and not in the service of the central narrative. Once the project developed momentum, the Subutai Corporation envisioned fans of the work contributing, expanding and enriching the narrative, and the fictional universe in which it takes place.

According to Jeremy Bornstein, president of the Subutai Corporation, the genesis of the project was in Stephenson's dissatisfaction with the authenticity of the early modern swordfighting scenes he had written into his series The Baroque Cycle. Stephenson gathered a group of martial arts enthusiasts interested in studying historical European swordfighting, and this eventually resulted in some of the members of this group collaborating on a set of stories that would make use of accurate representations of these martial arts. The collaborators decided that the project need not limit itself to the traditional novel form and began developing ideas on how to produce it in different media while retaining the caliber that would be expected of a new work by authors such as Stephenson or Bear.

An "alpha version" was demonstrated at the periodic application showcase SF App Show in San Francisco, California on May 25, 2010.

The serialized project ran from September 1, 2010 until January 25, 2012. New chapters, as well as supplemental materials, were released on a semi-regular schedule. The iOS apps were available in the Apple App Store, and the Android app was available in the Android Store. The print edition was published on April 24, 2012. The mongoliad.com website was subsequently closed.

== Subject of the published Mongoliad books ==
The serial novels and their related, shorter "SideQuests" are set in the authors' "Foreworld" universe, which they describe as "almost like the world we live in," during the mid-thirteenth century Mongol invasion of Europe, under leadership of Genghis Khan and his successor Ögedei Khan. The story includes descriptions of Ögedei Khan's court (notably, his rolling "ordo" tent); the geography, flora and fauna of the great Eurasian Steppe; and especially medieval European and Asian martial arts. A parallel plot line takes place in Rome, and includes highly detailed depictions of a papal conclave.

== Historical events and persons depicted in the Mongoliad series ==
The novels incorporate historical events in Poland, Rome, Russia and central Asia that ran concurrently with the last major events of the Mongol invasion. The authors construct a fictional narrative that connects all these events of the year 1241, describing some earlier historical events and adding other entirely fictional events and characters. Some medieval mythology is also included in the later books, especially the Holy Grail and elements of Norse mythology.

Mongol events and persons described in the books include Ögedei's recollection of the 1201 battle of Khalakhaljid Sands, which cemented Genghis' leadership of the clans, and the 1229 death of his brother Tolui, described in The Secret History of the Mongols as a heroic sacrifice to save Ögedei's life. Later, the 1241 death of Ögedei Khan (cause unknown) and the resulting recall of all the Khans to select a new "Khan of Khans" is woven into the fictional narrative.

The Siege of Kiev (1240) and other events in the Mongol invasion of Rus and Europe are described in 1241 by a survivor, as a group of the novel's fictional characters pass through the ruined city. The Battle of Mohi (Hungary) and the Battle of Legnica (Poland) are also described by fictional "survivors". Several religious orders of knights formed during the Crusades (and their leaders), including the Teutonic Order, Knights Hospitaller and Livonian Brothers of the Sword are involved in the narrative.

Historical events and persons in 1241 Rome include the papal conclave that selected Cardinal Castiglione to become Pope Celestine IV. Cardinal Fieschi (later Pope Innocent IV), and other future Popes are also members of the conclave. Senator Matteo Rosso Orsini and Holy Roman Emperor Frederick II also appear as fictionalized characters.

Alexander Nevsky's 1242 campaign against German and Estonian invaders is a major subject of Book 4, including the climactic Battle on the Ice. The mythical Baba Yaga helps the protagonists defend Kievan Rus'. In Book 5, the action shifts to the Albigensian Crusade against Catharism, and the 1244 siege of Château de Montségur.

== Commercially-published Foreworld Saga novels and short stories ==
=== The Mongoliad Cycle ===
The series is identified interchangeably by the publisher as The Foreworld Saga and Mongoliad Cycle.

- The Mongoliad, Book One, by Neal Stephenson, Erik Bear, Greg Bear, Joseph Brassey, Nicole Galland (aka E.D. deBirmingham), Cooper Moo and Mark Teppo; April, 2012.
- The Mongoliad, Book Two, by Neal Stephenson, Erik Bear, Greg Bear, Joseph Brassey, Nicole Galland (aka E.D. deBirmingham), Cooper Moo and Mark Teppo; September, 2012.
- The Mongoliad, Book Three, by Neal Stephenson, Erik Bear, Greg Bear, Joseph Brassey, Nicole Galland (aka E.D. deBirmingham), Cooper Moo and Mark Teppo; February, 2013.
- Katabasis, The Foreworld Saga, Book Four, by Joseph Brassey, Cooper Moo, Mark Teppo and Angus Trim, October, 2013. (The first Foreworld novel not co-authored by Neal Stephenson.)
- Siege Perilous, The Mongoliad Cycle, Book Five, by Nicole Galland (writing as E.D. deBirmingham); January, 2014

=== Foreworld SideQuests ===
These are, with the exception of the "Foreworld SideQuest Comics", of novelette length. They were initially published in e-book and audio formats.

- Sinner, by Mark Teppo; August, 2012.
- Dreamer, by Mark Teppo; September, 2012.
- The Lion in Chains, by Mark Teppo; October, 2012.
- The Shield Maiden, by Michael Tinker Pearce and Linda Pearce; November, 2012.
- The Beast of Calatrava, by Mark Teppo; January, 2013.
- Seer, by Mark Teppo; February, 2013.
- The Book of Seven Hands, by Barth Anderson; March, 2013.
- The Assassination of Orange, by Joseph Brassey; April, 2013.
- Hearts of Iron, by Scott James Magner; May, 2013.
- Symposium #1 (comic format), by Christian Cameron (author) and Dmitry Bondarenko (illustrator); July, 2013.
- Tyr's Hammer by Michael Tinker Pearce and Linda Pearce; October, 2013.
- Symposium #1 (comic format), by Christian Cameron (author) and Dmitry Bondarenko (illustrator); October, 2013.
- Marshal versus the Assassins, by M. Harold Page; November, 2013.
- Blood and Ashes, by Scott James Magner; February, 2014
- Suffrajitsu: Mrs. Pankhurst's Amazons (comic format), by Tony Wolf (author) and João Vieira (illustrator); January, 2015.

=== Kindle World fan fiction stories ===
In keeping with Subutai's original intent to augment the Foreworld Saga with fan or community content, fan fiction publisher Kindle Worlds published ten new stories "inspired by" the Foreworld Saga in June, 2013. Foreworld Saga co-author and showrunner Mark Teppo explains, "As you can see from the Kindle Worlds storefront, there is a distinction between Canon and Kindle Worlds material. We’d like to see some of the Kindle Worlds material elevate itself up to Canon by its quality."

- The Outcast, by Robert Kroese; June, 2013. Taking place during the Viking invasions.
- The Qian, by Aric Davis; June, 2013. Taking place during the Mongol war.
- Kingdom of Glass, by Roberto Calas; June, 2013. Taking place toward the end of the Hundred Years War.
- Sword of the Scholar, by Mel Odom; June, 2013. Taking place during the Ming Dynasty China.
- Bloodaxe, by Charles Sasser; June, 2013. Taking place during the Viking invasions.
- The Brutus Coin, by Leigh Knight; June, 2013. Taking place after the assassination of Julius Caesar.
- Envoy, by Anselm Audley; June, 2013. Taking place during the wars of Attila the Hun.
- Belly Full of Hell, by Aric Davis; June, 2013. Pit fighting during the Mongol war.
- The Mountain of Mist and Shadow, by S.M. Ruttan; June, 2013. Taking place during Julius Caesar's wars.
- The Adventures of Dysingli Soon, by Joanna D. Jakubcin; June, 2013. Taking place in Medieval Rome.
- Lanes of the Victorious, by Jon Mickus; January, 2014. Taking place during the First Mithridatic War of the Roman Republic.
- Sword of Mongetai, by Richard Stiller; March, 2014. Taking place right after the Mongol invasions of Kievan Rus'.
- Out of the East, by Jerry Goodwyn; March, 2014. Taking place after the death of Pope Clement IV.
- Infernal Castles, by Jon Mickus; July, 2014. The sequel to Lanes of the Victorious.
- Shield of Mongetai, by Richard Stiller; August, 2014. The sequel to Sword of Mongetai.
- The Veil of God, by R. Randolph Irwin; December, 2014.

Kindle Worlds also published four works of prose fan-fiction inspired by the Suffrajitsu graphic novel trilogy:

- The Pale Blue Ribbon, by John Longenbaugh; February, 2015.
- The Isle of Dogs, by Michael Lussier; March, 2015.
- Carried Away, by Ray Dean; March, 2015.
- The Second-Story Girl, by Mark Lingane; March, 2015.

== See also ==
- 253 (novel) a novel by Geoff Ryman initially released as a website
- Interactive novel
- Project Hieroglyph
