= Ishmael and the Return of the Dugongs =

Novel by Michael Gerard Bauer

- Author: Michael Gerard Bauer
- Language: English
- Series: Don't Call Me Ishmael
- Genre: Young adult fiction
- Publisher: Scholastic (Australia); HarperTeen (USA)
- Publication date: 2007
- Publication place: Australia
- Media type: Print
- Pages: 295 pp
- Preceded by: Don't Call Me Ishmael

Ishmael and the Return of the Dugongs is a fiction book by Michael Gerard Bauer, released in 2007. It is the first sequel to Don't Call Me Ishmael. Ishmael and the Return of the Dugongs won the "Book Council of Australia: Junior Judges Award" in 2007. It was also on the shortlist for the 2009 Children's Peace Literature Award from the Australian Psychological Society.

== Plot summary ==
The novel continues on from the end of Don't Call Me Ishmael. It is about a fifteen-year-old boy named Ishmael Leseur and his friends/debating team- James Scobie, Ignatius Prindabel, Orazio Zorzotto and Bill Kingsley. Ishmael tries to get with an attractive girl named Kelly Faulkner, at the same time as keeping away from the school bully, Barry Bagsley. Along with that, Ishmael's father's band, "The Dugongs" tries to reform.
