= Crystal Nights (short story) =

2008 short story by Greg Egan

- Short story by Greg Egan
- Country: Australia
- Language: English
- Genre: Science fiction

Publication
- Published in: Interzone
- Publication type: Periodical
- Publisher: TTA Press
- Media type: Print
- Publication date: April 2008

"Crystal Nights" is a science-fiction short story by Australian writer Greg Egan, first published in Interzone 215 in April 2008.

The short story was included in the collections Crystal Nights and Other Stories in 2009, Oceanic in 2009 and The Best of Greg Egan in 2020.

== Plot ==
Eccentric tech billionaire Daniel Cliff wants to launch a project to use his technology based on crystallography to simulate a natural evolution of artificial intelligence. He tries to recruit AI researcher Julie Dehghani, but she refuses cooperation and raises moral and ethical concerns as the project would include suffering and death for the simulated beings. Daniel objects that somebody else with much more evil intentions could be faster playing god. He continues alone with the help of his assistant Lucien Crace and the financial backing of his company. He creates beings called Phites in a world called Sapphire inside a crystal. They quickly evolve and reach the same technological level as humans, even developing the quark model. Daniel contacts a Phite called Primo to reveal him the truth about his existence and to seek his help to develop a larger computer capable to extend their virtual world. He becomes angry when Primo does not immediately respond to pledge allegiance, as he hopes that when the Phites continue to advance they will also lift him up as their creator. Shortly after, a radioactive burst is detected, which burns Daniel and is traced back to the Phites' having created a wormhole to escape. Feeling betrayed, Daniel decides in the hospital that he has to create a new universe again, but needing allies within to carry the load for him.

== Translation ==
The short story was translated in Japanese (2010), Spanish (2013) and French (2015).

== Background ==
Egan's novel Permutation City, which was released in 1994, also deals with the natural evolution of simulated beings, which in the novel happens with a cellular automaton called Autoverse. In an FAQ after the novel was published, Egan wrote,

What I regret most is my uncritical treatment of the idea of allowing intelligent life to evolve in the Autoverse. Sure, this is a common science-fictional idea, but when I thought about it properly (some years after the book was published), I realised that anyone who actually did this would have to be utterly morally bankrupt. To get from micro-organisms to intelligent life this way would involve an immense amount of suffering, with billions of sentient creatures living, struggling and dying along the way. Yes, this happened to our own ancestors, but that doesn’t give us the right to inflict the same kind of suffering on anyone else.

== Reception ==
=== Reviews ===
Russell Letson, writing in the Locus Magazine, states that the short story "turns on the morality of developing artificial minds by mimicking evolution – of playing god with sentient beings that happen to run in a computer" and that "Egan’s moral, ethical, and social-political interests are woven throughout, and they are thematically central."

Salik Shah, writing in the Reactor Magazine, thinks that the short story "is a fine story, one eminently worthy of Hollywood or Netflix adaptation, for it crystalizes (ahem) Egan’s ethical concerns relating to AI development for all to see."

=== Awards ===
The short story was nominated for the British SF Association Award in 2009 and for the Japanese Seiun Award in 2011. It reached the 7th place in the Reader Poll of the Locus Award in 2009 and the 3rd place of the Interzone Readers Poll in 2009.
