= Don't Call Me Ishmael =

2006 book by Michael Gerard Bauer

- First edition cover
- Author: Michael Gerard Bauer
- Illustrator: Michael Gerard Bauer
- Cover artist: Joe Bauer (Australian edition)
- Language: English
- Series: Ishmael
- Release number: 1st in series
- Genre: Young adult fiction
- Publisher: Scholastic (Australia); HarperTeen (USA)
- Publication date: 2006
- Publication place: Australia
- Media type: Print
- Pages: 277 pg.
- ISBN: 1-86291-666-7 (Australia); 0-06-134834-1 (USA)
- OCLC: 156423000
- Followed by: Ishmael and the Return of the Dugongs

Don't Call Me Ishmael is a young adult novel by Australian author Michael Gerard Bauer. It is about Ishmael Leseur, a 14-year-old boy, and his experiences in Year 9 of school. It won the 2008 award for children's literature at Writers' Week, Australia's oldest writers' festival. It was short-listed for the Children's Book Council of Australia's Book of the Year award in the older reader category in 2007. In April 2018, Don't Call Me Ishmael: The Musical by Fin Nicol-Taylor and Christopher Thomson, was premiered in Brisbane.

== Plot ==
His Year Nine teacher, Miss Tarango, tells the whole class about the name Ishmael coming from Moby-Dick, which gives Barry and his friends more names to tease Ishmael with. Ishmael later intervenes when he sees Barry and his friends tease a boy who joins Ishmael's year level. A new boy called James Scobie becomes a target for bullying because of his appearance. However, James responds to the bully's taunts with humour. He tells the class that he is fearless because he had a brain tumour that damaged the part of his brain that feels fear. Barry is the only person that does not believe James. About a week later, Barry puts a lot of insects and spiders in James's desk, but James is not frightened. During a rugby match against Churchill, James's fearlessness changes the course of the game with a speech that invokes courage.

Ishmael, Scobie, a hilarious, outgoing and independent boy called Orazio Zorzotto, an overweight, sci-fi geek called Bill Kingsley and a very smart nerd Ignatius Prindabel participate in debating. Ishmael only joins because he feels sorry for James (and because James promises to not make him speak onstage). However, Ishmael is forced to debate due to Bill being sick and then later because James has a checkup about his brain tumour. The team does not win, missing out by just one point, however they are still incredibly happy to have gone that far. Barry and his friends mock Bill about his weight by destroying his debating certificate, angering Ishmael as well. Kelly Faulkner, a girl Ishmael starts to fall in love with (for a fair reason) at the debating workshop, thanks Ishmael because she is the sister of the Year Four boy that Ishmael helped to "save" from Barry. On the last day of school at the 'end-of-year extravaganza thingy', Ishmael invents a prayer that will humiliate Barry. However, he eventually decides not to say his prayer, because he does not want to humiliate Barry's innocent parents, ruin the ceremony for the people who worked to make it or become the person Barry was. Ishmael then receives a letter from Kelly. He runs out on to the school's oval, completely ecstatic and bursting with happiness, and reads the letter, which says that she has invited him to her friend's party. He finally realizes that his life is not as bad as he once have believed.

== Dedication ==
The book is dedicated "To Greg, Keith and Anne, because it's all about friendship, love and laughter ... and because I took your threats seriously."
