= Cruising (play) =

2008 Australian play by Alexandra Edmondson

- Original language: English
- Written by: Alexandra Edmondson
- Genre: Drama

Premiere
- Date: 6 March 2008
- Place: Australia

Cruising is an Australian play written by Alexandra Edmondson. It opened at the Tap Gallery in Darlinghurst, Sydney, on 6 March 2008, directed by Michael Dahlstrom.

Prior to opening, the play was responsible for much media debate in Sydney. This was initiated by the Sydney Daily Telegraph which ran the headline "Stage play 'an insult to Dianne's memory". The newspaper alleged that circumstances in the play were similar to the real life alleged drink spiking and death of Dianne Brimble and contacted Mark Brimble (Dianne Brimble's ex-husband) for a statement. This caused a "media frenzy" in the press and the ABC's Radio National was quick to follow up with an interview of Mr. Brimble and the playwright. 2UE and Channel Seven's Sunrise program also joined the debate.

The merits of the play were argued in the Australian national press. The debate concerned whether artists had the right to use recent, real life, horrific events as inspiration for their work.

The Daily Telegraph later reviewed the play and described it as having "a ferocious energy throughout."
