= Michael Gerard Bauer =

Australian children's and young adult author

- Born: 1955 (age 70–71); Brisbane, Australia
- Occupation: Author
- Website: michaelgerardbauer.com

Michael Gerard Bauer (born 1955) is an Australian full-time children's and young adult author, and was formerly an English teacher.

== Biography ==
Bauer was born in Brisbane and attended Marist College Ashgrove before attending the University of Queensland. He completed an Arts Degree with a triple Major in English literature and became a teacher of Economics and English in Brisbane and Ipswich secondary schools. In 2003, Bauer won the inaugural Writesmall Short Story competition at the Brisbane Writers Festival.

Bauer lives in Brisbane Queensland. The Running Man, his first novel was well received, winning the 2005 CBCA Book of the Year for Older Readers; was listed as one of the top 10 books for young adults for 2004 in Magpies magazine; and was short-listed for the 2005 NSW Premier's Award, Victorian Premier's Award, and the 2006 South Australian Festival Awards for Literature. The Running Man also won the Courier Mail 2005 People's Choice Award for Younger Readers. In 2008 it won the German Catholic Youth Book Award for promoting Christian values in children's literature. The presentation ceremony took place in Mainz, Germany in June 2008. Bauer has also written six other books, Don't Call Me Ishmael (2006), Ishmael and the Return of the Dugongs (2007), Dinosaur Knights (2008), You Turkeys (2009), Just a Dog (2010) and Ishmael and the Hoops of Steel (2011).

Don't Call Me Ishmael won the 2008 South Australian Festival Award for Literature; the 2007 Children's Peace Literature Award; the Children's Book Council of Australia Junior Judges Award in 2007; and was short-listed for the 2007 NSW Premier's Award and the 2007 CBCA Award for Older Readers. It was selected for the 2007 White Ravens festival at the Bologna Book Fair. The sequel, Ishmael and the Return of the Dugongs, was awarded a Notable Book at the CBCA Awards for Older Readers in 2008.

Just a Dog was an Honour Book for the 2011 CBCA Book of the Year, Younger Readers category. It won the 2011 Queensland Premier's Literary Award, Younger Readers.

The third book in the Ishmael trilogy was released in July 2011 and is entitled Ishmael and the Hoops of Steel. It was short-listed for the Children's Peace Literature Award in 2011 and the CBCA Book of the Year, Older Readers category in 2012.

In November 2012 the first of three books for Younger Readers was released, titled Eric Vale Epic Fail. The sequels Eric Vale Super Male and Eric Vale Off the Rails were published in 2013. All three comedy books have extensive illustrations by his son, Joe Bauer. A spin-off comedy series for younger readers featuring the character Secret Agent Derek 'Danger' Dale followed. These are Secret Agent Derek 'Danger' Dale The Case of Animals Behaving Really, REALLY Badly; Secret Agent Derek 'Danger' Dale The Case of the Really, REALLY Scary Things; and Secret Agent Derek 'Danger' Dale The Case of the Really, REALLY Magnetic Magnet. Eric Vale, Epic Fail was adapted into a family musical by THAT Production Company in 2015, and was first presented by the company at the StoryArts Festival Ipswich.

In 2014 Eric Vale Epic Fail won the Bilby Award (Queensland Children's Choice Award), was short-listed for the Yabba Awards (Young Australians Best Book Awards) for 2013 & 2014, and was chosen as an Honour Book for the Koala Awards 2014 (NSW Children's Choice Awards). Eric Vale Off the Rails was selected as one of the Get Reading 50 Books You Can't Put Down in 2013 and Eric Vale Super Male was short-listed for the 2015 Yabba Awards.

In May 2016 a young adult comedy novel was released entitled, The Pain, My Mother, Sir Tiffy, Cyber Boy & Me.

In 2018 Bauer's first picture book Rodney Loses It! illustrated by Chrissie Krebs won the CBCA Book of the Year in the Early Childhood category as well as 2018 Speech Pathology Book of the Year award in the 3 to 5 years category.

The YA novel The Things That Will Not Stand was released in September 2018. It won the 2019 Prime Minister's Literary Award for YA literature. It was also a 2019 White Ravens Selection by the International Youth Library in the field of international children's and youth literature.

At the 2018 Queensland Literary Awards Bauer received one of three Queensland Writers Fellowships to write a new YA novel.

The sequel to Rodney Loses It! entitled Rodney Forgets It! was published in 2022.

In 2022 Bauer was awarded The Dame Annabelle Rankin Award for Distinguished Services to Children's Literature by the Queensland Branch of the Children's Book Council of Australia.

Bauer's works have been translated into Dutch, German, Italian, French, Spanish, Korean, Norwegian, Czech, Slovak, Hebrew, Turkish, Portuguese, Chinese and Polish and are sold in over forty countries.

== Bibliography ==
- The Running Man (2004)
- Don't Call Me Ishmael (2006)
- Ishmael and the Return of the Dugongs (2007)
- Dinosaur Knights (2008)
- You Turkeys (2009)
- Just a Dog (2010)
- Ishmael and the Hoops of Steel (2011)
- Eric Vale Epic Fail (2012)
- Eric Vale Super Male (2013)
- Eric Vale Off the Rails (2013)
- Secret Agent Derek 'Danger' Dale The Case of Animals Behaving Really REALLY Badly (2014)
- Secret Agent Derek 'Danger' Dale The Case of the Really REALLY Scary Things (2015)
- Secret Agent Derek 'Danger' Dale The Case of the Really REALLY Magnetic Magnet (2015)
- The Pain, My Mother, Sir Tiffy, Cyber Boy & Me (2016)
- Rodney Loses It (2017)
- The Things That Will Not Stand (2018)
- Rodney Forgets It! (2022)
