= Mark Teppo =

American author

- Born: May 21, 1968 (age 58); Ridgecrest, California, U.S.
- Occupations: Novelist; short story writer; music journalist
- Writing career
- Genres: Science fiction, fantasy, Speculative fiction, Music journalism
- Literary movement: Urban Fantasy
- Website: markteppo.com

Mark Teppo (born May 21, 1968) is an American author of contemporary fantasy and science fiction. His work is strongly peppered with references to occult concepts, most commonly those of Hermeticism and Alchemy. Prior to his current tenure as a fiction writer Teppo was a music journalist working both as a staff reviewer and editor for various publications such as Earpollution, Igloo Magazine, Earplug, and OPi8.com. Teppo is also Chief Creative Officer of Subutai Corporation, whose first offering is the interactive fiction project The Mongoliad.

== Bibliography ==
- The Oneiromantic Mosaic of Harry Potemkin (2007) is an experimental, non-linear, hypertext novel formatted as an internet journal mixed with modern epistolary elements. It was originally published as a monthly serial in the online magazine Farrago's Wainscot, but is now available in an organized form at The Potemkin Mosaic.
- How the Mermaid Lost her Song (2007) - Short story in the online publication Strange Horizons.
- The One That Got Away (2008) - Short story in the World Fantasy Award-winning Paper Cities, published by Senses Five Press
- Lightbreaker (2009) is the first in a series of urban fantasy thriller novels published by Night Shade Books called the Codex of Souls. The series follows protagonist L. Michael Markham, an initiate of a Western esoteric tradition in our contemporary world.
- Heartland (2010) is the sequel to Lightbreaker.
- The Lost Technique of Blackmail and De Orso Meo Ad Veneficum (2010) - Short stories in the Hugo Award-winning Electric Velocipede serial anthology issue 19.
- The Mongoliad (2010) - Serial adventure novel in collaboration with Neal Stephenson, Greg Bear, "and friends".
- Angel Tongue (forthcoming) is the third installment of the Codex of Souls series, following Heartland.
- Earth thirst. Night Shade Books.

=== Critical studies and reviews of Teppo's work ===
- Heck, Peter (December 2013). "On Books". Asimov's Science Fiction. 37 (12): 107–111. Review of Earth thirst.
