= Malla Nunn =

Swaziland-born Australian writer, screenwriter and director (born 1963)

- Born: 1963 (age 62–63); Swaziland
- Education: University of Western Australia
- Writing career
- Language: English
- Years active: 2008–present
- Genres: Crime fiction Young Adult fiction
- Notable work: Emmanuel Cooper series
- Notable awards: 12 awards

Malla Nunn (born 1963) is a Swaziland-born Australian screenwriter, film director and author. Her works include the murder mysteries A Beautiful Place to Die and Let the Dead Lie, as well as the award-winning young adult novel, When the Ground Is Hard.

== Private life ==
Nunn was born in Swaziland in 1963 and moved to Perth with her parents in the 1970s. She attended the University of Western Australia graduating with a B.A. with a double major in English and History. She completed a M.A. in Theatre Studies at Villanova University in Philadelphia. While in America she met her husband-to-be and they live with their two children in Sydney.

== Career ==
Nunn wrote and directed several short films including the documentary Servant of the Ancestors in 1998 which screened at several festivals. It won Best Documentary Silver Images, Pan African, Zanzibar Film Festival, 2000. Her first book A Beautiful Place to Die was published in 2008. It is the first instalment in the Emmanuel Cooper series of novels, set in South Africa in the beginning of the apartheid era.

== Bibliography ==
=== Crime fiction ===
Emmanuel Cooper series

- A Beautiful Place to Die (2008)
- Let the Dead Lie (2010)
- Silent Valley (2012) also known as Blessed are the Dead
- Present Darkness (2014)

Other

- Contributor to If I Tell You... I'll Have to Kill You (Michael Robotham editor) (2013)

=== Young adult fiction ===
- When the Ground Is Hard (2019)
- Sugar Town Queens (2022)

== Awards ==
- 2009 Winner Davitt Award – Best Adult Novel – A Beautiful Place to Die
- 2011 nominated Ned Kelly Awards for Crime Writing – Best Novel – Let the Dead Lie
- Highly Commended – Ellis Peters Historical Crime Awards – Let the Dead Lie
- 2013 shortlisted Davitt Award – Best Adult Crime Novel – Silent Valley
- 2013 shortlisted Ned Kelly Awards for Crime Writing – Best Fiction – Silent Valley
- 2013 nominated Edgar Allan Poe Awards – Best Paperback Original – Blessed are the Dead (a.k.a. Silent Valley)
- 2015 shortlisted Ned Kelly Awards – Best Adult Crime Novel – Present Darkness
- 2015 shortlisted Davitt Award – Adult Fiction – Present Darkness
- 2019 winner LA Times Book Prize – Young Adult – When the Ground Is Hard
- 2020 winner Bank Street Children's Book Committee Josette Frank Award, Best Book of the Year with "Outstanding Merit" – When the Ground Is Hard
- 2020 shortlisted Children's Book Council of Australia Children's Book of the Year Award: Older Readers – When the Ground Is Hard
- 2020 shortlisted Davitt Award – Best Young Adult crime novel
- 2022 shortlisted Children's Book Council of Australia Children's Book of the Year Award: Older Readers – Sugar Town Queens
