= Anne Gracie =

Australian novelist

Anne Gracie is an Australian author of historical romance novels. Her books have been shortlisted for the RITA Award and she has twice won the Australian Romance Writer of the Year award and National Readers Choice Award (USA). She lives in Melbourne, Victoria.

== Bibliography ==
=== The Marriage of Convenience ===
- Marry in Haste (#1)
- Marry in Scandal (#2)
- Marry in Secret (#3)
- Marry in Scarlet (#4) – winner, Favourite Historical Romance, 2020 Australian Romance Readers Awards

=== The Chance Sisters ===
- The Autumn Bride (#1)
- The Winter Bride (#2)
- The Spring Bride (#3)
- The Summer Bride (July 2016) (#4)

=== The Devil Riders ===
- The Stolen Princess (#1)
- His Captive Lady (#2)
- To Catch a Bride (#3)
- The Accidental Wedding (#4)
- Bride By Mistake (#5)

=== The Merridew Sisters ===
- The Perfect Rake (#1)
- The Perfect Waltz (#2)
- The Perfect Stranger (#3)
- The Perfect Kiss (#4)
