= David J. Schwartz (science fiction writer) =

American novelist

- Born: September 22, 1970 (age 55)
- Occupation: Writer
- Writing career
- Genres: Science fiction; fantasy

David J. Schwartz (born September 22, 1970) is an American science fiction and fantasy writer, whose novel Superpowers was a finalist for the Nebula Award. Schwartz is also author of the Kindle Serial Gooseberry Bluff Community College of Magic: The Thirteenth Rib.

== Bibliography ==
=== Short fiction ===
Title	Year	First published in	Reprinted/collected in
Today's friends	2013	"Asimov's Science Fiction". Asimov's Science Fiction. Vol. 37, no. 7. July 2013. pp. 74–82.	
