= Ekaterina Sedia =

Russian fantasy writer (born 1970)

- Born: Ekaterina Holland; July 9, 1970 (age 56); Moscow, Russia
- Education: Rutgers, The State University of New Jersey-Camden
- Occupations: Novelist, botany and plant ecology professor
- Writing career
- Pen name: E. Sedia
- Genres: Fantasy, steampunk, urban fantasy
- Notable work: The Alchemy of Stone
- Website: ekaterinasedia.com

Ekaterina Sedia (born July 9, 1970) is a Russian fantasy writer. She immigrated to the United States and attended college in New Jersey to obtain her Ph.D. Her most famous work is The Alchemy of Stone, a steampunk novel that examines sexism and class bigotry. Sedia's other novels include The Secret History of Moscow, According to Crow, Heart of Iron, and The House of Discarded Dreams. She has also written several short fiction stories, poems, and nonfiction books, as well as edited anthologies of short stories. Several of her publications have been nominated for awards and/or have made a well-known reading list. In addition, Sedia was the editor for Jigsaw Nation and the World Fantasy Award-winning Paper Cities: An Anthology of Urban Fantasy. In addition to writing, she teaches ecology and evolution courses as a professor at Stockton University in Galloway, New Jersey.

== Background and early life ==
Ekaterina Sedia was born on July 9, 1970 in Moscow, Russia, as Ekaterina Holland. At age 21, Sedia moved to the United States to pursue advanced degrees. She currently teaches plant ecology and botany at Stockton University and lives in New Jersey with her husband Christopher Sedia and their cats. In her spare time, she blogs about fashion, food, cats, books, television, and feminism.

== Education ==
Sedia did her undergraduate work at Moscow State University. She later moved to Boston and worked at MIT’s Department of Brain and Cognitive Science as a research assistant. After that she moved to New Jersey and went to graduate school at Rutgers University-Camden, which is where she got her Ph.D. in ecology and evolution in 2001. Today she works at Stockton University teaching plant ecology and evolution.

== Writing ==
Sedia has written novels, short stories, and essays, and has also edited several anthologies. Her work features folklore, fantasy, urban fantasy, and steampunk aesthetics. She has occasionally published under the name E. Sedia.

=== Novels ===
==== According to Crow (May 2005) ====
In this story set in Sium, Josiah lives in a world where even though the war is over it is still not great times. The war had been over for seventeen years: however, there is no doubt the Meran Empire would expand. Josiah meets Caleb and they become friends. The two boys leave the country for fear of being persecuted and they find a strange world. A war is about to happen and Josiah must choose sides and potentially betray his heritage.

==== The Secret History of Moscow (November 2007) ====
The Secret History of Moscow is a fantasy novel set in the underworld of capitalist Russia. Galina lives in Moscow with her sister who gives birth in a bathroom. She then turns into a jackdaw and flies away. At first Galina is reluctant to report anything because of her history of mental illness. She then meets an alcoholic artist named Fyodor who claims he knows where the bird people go. Galina finally tells Yakov about this strange transformation and he too says he has seen something similar. Fyodor then takes them to a magical doorway to underground Moscow where creatures from Old Russian folklore live. They resurrect a dead body who then tells them his old boss might be responsible for the weird things that are going on.

==== The Alchemy of Stone (July 2008) ====
In The Alchemy of Stone skilled alchemist named Mattie, who is a living doll, finds herself in a conflict between gargoyles mechanics, and alchemists. The city is under threat of revolution and Mattie learns of secrets that could change the balance of power in the city. Loharri, Mattie's creator learns of this and this upsets him. He has the key to Mattie's heart literally and will do what it takes to stop her.

==== The House of Discarded Dreams (November 2010) ====
The House of Discarded Dreams is set in New Jersey and is considered urban fantasy. College student Vimbai moves out and away from her controlling mother. She moves into a house on the beach with two other roommates where strange things start to happen. Maya is followed by a pack of dog like animals and Felix has a pocket universe instead of hair. Vimbai's dead grandmother returns as a ghost and starts doing house work. The house one day floats off to sea and starts expanding. Vimbai must find a way home and on her journey she unexpectedly learns about herself culturally.

==== Heart of Iron (July 2011) ====
Heart of Iron takes place in Russia in 1852. Sasha an eighteen-year-old is enrolled into a university thanks to her aunt. At first, Sasha is concerned with sexism until she starts to notice that the Chinese students are disappearing. A boy with strange powers named Jack helps Sasha stop a kidnapping and this when she learns that a war could break out between China and Russia or China and England or both.

=== Editing work ===
Sedia was an intern non-fiction editor for Clarkesworld Magazine, in the fall of 2008.

She is also editor of the Award-winning Paper Cities: An Anthology of Urban Fantasy (2008), and other collections including Circus Fantasy: Fantasy Under the Big Top (2012), Jigsaw Nation (2006), and Running with the Pack (2010).

=== Awards ===
- World Fantasy Award winner for Paper Cities: An Anthology of Urban Fantasy (2009)
- James Tiptree, Jr. Award (Honor List): The Alchemy of Stone (2009)
- Locus Award:
  - 10th place - The Alchemy of Stone (2009)
  - 13th place - The Secret History of Moscow (2008)
  - 15th place - Heart of Iron (2012)
  - 18th place - The House of Discarded Dreams (2011)
- Analog Readers Poll Winner for "Alphabet Angels" (2006)
- Sidewise Award for Alternate History (nomination): Heart of Iron (2012)"

== Academic career ==
Sedia is an associate professor of biology at Stockton University, in Galloway, New Jersey.

Sedia specializes in the characteristics of the New Jersey Pine Barrens and how the population of lichens, mosses, and grasses affect the forests and the succession of the forest. She coauthored an influential paper on the differential effects of lichens, mosses, and grasses on respiration and nitrogen mineralization, how it promotes an alternate plant community, and decomposition of litter in the New Jersey Pinelands.
