= Incandescence (novel) =

2008 novel by Greg Egan

- First edition
- Author: Greg Egan
- Language: English
- Genre: Science fiction
- Publisher: Gollancz
- Publication date: 15 May 2008
- Publication place: United Kingdom
- Media type: Print (Hardback & Paperback)
- Pages: 304
- ISBN: 978-0-575-08162-8
- OCLC: 192027449

Incandescence is a 2008 science fiction novel by Australian author Greg Egan. The book is based on the idea that the theory of general relativity could be discovered by a pre-industrial civilisation.

== Plot summary ==
The novel has two narratives in alternate chapters. The first follows two citizens of the Amalgam, a Milky Way-spanning civilisation, investigating the origin of DNA found on a meteor by the Aloof. The Aloof control the galactic core and, until the novel begins, have rejected all attempts at contact by the Amalgam. The second narrative is set on a small world known as the Splinter, and covers the attempts by its inhabitants to understand the environment within which their home exists. As the story progresses, it becomes clear that the Splinter orbits a collapsed star within its accretion disk and is subject to various dangers. The two stories come together in a complex twist which involves a kind of past/future first contact role reversal.

Much of the narrative explores the effects of orbital dynamics around a high mass object and requires an understanding of Newtonian gravitation and at least a basic familiarity with general relativity and its application to black holes and neutron stars to be compelling. Understanding the story's wider frame of reference and the Splinter's encounter with the Wanderer are tied in with this.

The Amalgam is explored in three other short stories, Riding the Crocodile, Glory, and Hot Rock.

== Criticism ==
One review compared Incandescence to "a not particularly enthralling lecture on the process of scientific discovery, combined with the physics of a black hole". Another reviewer described much of this criticism as "trite received opinion" and said the book had "hints of greatness and pleasing moments" but its structure was "a failed literary experiment" and ultimately rather dull.

On June 6, 2008, British writer Adam Roberts released a review criticizing Incandescence for its awkward prose and weak characterization. In response, Egan dissected the review, going so far as to call it "probably the first genuine hatchet job I've ever received." In particular, he accuses Adam Roberts of malicious nitpicking and straw man argument, and suggests that Roberts should have known he would be unfairly biased against the book and refused to review it:

But if someone aspires to be taken seriously as a reviewer, they either need to read the entire book, carefully, and give at least as much thought to what they've read as a twelve-year-old would when sitting a reading comprehension test, or — if that prospect is far too unpleasant to bear — they should decline to review the book. [...] In short, Roberts has as much of a good time as I'd have at the Bayreuth Festival, and as little worth reporting about the experience. The mystery is why he bought the ticket in the first place; a previous encounter with Schild's Ladder should have warned off any but the most masochistic of science-haters.

— Greg Egan

== Notes ==
- The names of the directions in the Splinter (shomal/junub for above/below the plane of the orbit, rarb/sharq for in/opposite of the direction of orbit and garm/sard for closer/farther to the Hub) are derived from the Arabic words for North (شمال shemaal), South (جنوب janoob), East (شرق sharq), and West (الغرب gharb) via Persian as well as from the Persian words for hot (داغ dagh) and cold (سرد sard).
