= List of dark ambient artists =

The following is a list of notable artists who compose, or have composed, dark ambient music at some point in their careers.

== #, A ==
- 0010x0010
- 156
- 1476
- Θ (Theta)
- Abu Lahab
- Actress
- Adonxs
- AeTopus
- Agalloch
- Giulio Aldinucci
- Alio Die
- All Hail the Transcending Ghost
- Altar of Plagues
- Alva Noto
- Amber Asylum
- Kristian Eidnes Andersen
- Martin Stig Andersen
- Peter Andersson
- Anenzephalia
- Antimatter
- Aphex Twin
- Apollon
- Arcana
- Arditi
- Art Zoyd
- Ascension of the Watchers
- Ataraxia
- aTelecine
- Atrium Carceri
- Attrition
- Aube
- Austere
- Autopsia
- Autumn Tears
- Daniel Avery
- The Axis of Perdition
- Nigel Ayers

== B ==
- Christoph de Babalon
- Angelo Badalamenti
- Bad Sector
- Kelly Bailey
- Aidan Baker
- Blixa Bargeld
- Bark Psychosis
- Barn Owl
- William Basinski
- Bass Communion
- Bastard Noise
- Tyler Bates
- Bobby Beausoleil
- Beequeen
- Michael Begg
- Beherit
- Bell Witch
- Belong
- John Bergin
- Eraldo Bernocchi
- Harry Bertoia
- Maurizio Bianchi
- Big City Orchestra
- Biosphere
- Birchville Cat Motel
- Joseph Bishara
- Black Dice
- The Black Dog
- Blackhouse
- Black Rain
- Black Tape for a Blue Girl
- Blood Incantation
- Bloodyminded
- Blut Aus Nord
- Der Blutharsch
- The Body
- The Body Lovers / The Body Haters
- Bohren & der Club of Gore
- Boris
- Brighter Death Now
- Eric Brosius
- Burzum

== C ==
- Cabaret Voltaire
- Ethel Cain
- The Caretaker
- Kim Cascone
- Ben Chatwin
- Cindytalk
- Cisfinitum
- Cities Last Broadcast
- Coil
- Continuum
- Controlled Bleeding
- CTI
- Cultus Sabbati

== D ==
- Deathprod
- Decree
- Demdike Stare
- Deutsch Nepal
- D2s1

== E ==
- Einstürzende Neubauten
- Endura
- HEXA: Lawrence English and Jamie Stewart
- Brian Eno
- Esoteric

== F ==
- Jeffrey Fayman
- Dominick Fernow
- Fever Ray
- Final
- Robert Fripp
- Peter Frohmader
- Ben Frost

== G ==
- Roopam Garg
- Gnaw Their Tongues
- Godspeed You! Black Emperor
- Martin Grech
- Jeff Greinke

== H ==
- Paul Haslinger
- Jon Hassell
- The Haxan Cloak
- Simon Heath
- Tim Hecker
- Hecq
- Aubrey Hodges
- Hwyl Nofio

== I, J ==
- David Jackman
- Jarboe
- Jóhann Jóhannsson

== K ==
- Edward Ka-Spel
- Kammarheit
- The Knife
- Thomas Köner
- Kreng
- David Kristian

== L ==
- Lab Report
- Lifelover
- Andrew Liles
- Love Spirals Downwards
- Lull
- Lustmord
- Lycia
- David Lynch

== M ==
- Main
- Daniel Menche
- Merzbow
- Mesektet
- Midnight Syndicate
- Mortiis
- Murcof
- Mz.412

== N ==
- Nadja
- Natural Snow Buildings
- Nebulon
- Neptune Towers
- Phill Niblock
- Nine Inch Nails
- Nocturnal Emissions
- Noisegate
- NON
- Nordvargr
- Not Your Average Hippy
- Nox Arcana
- Nurse with Wound

== O ==
- Pauline Oliveros
- Oranssi Pazuzu
- O Yuki Conjugate

== P, Q ==
- Painkiller
- Charlemagne Palestine
- Pan American
- Pantha du Prince
- Sandro Perri
- PGR
- James Plotkin
- Popol Vuh
- Portal
- Psychick Warriors ov Gaia
- Fatima Al Qadiri

== R ==
- Raison d'être
- Rapoon
- The Residents
- Graeme Revell
- Trent Reznor
- Robert Rich
- Bill Rieflin
- Steve Roach
- Rome
- Sam Rosenthal
- Atticus Ross
- Ruptured World

== S ==
- Ryuichi Sakamoto
- Karl Sanders
- Matthew Schultz
- Scorn
- Seirom
- Steven Severin
- Shackleton
- Soap&Skin
- Spektr
- SPK
- Alan Splet
- Stars of the Lid
- Storm Corrosion
- Andy Stott
- Stratvm Terror
- Sunn O)))
- Swans

== T ==
- Teho Teardo
- Techno Animal
- Toroidh
- Trepaneringsritualen
- Triangular Ascension
- Trust Obey

== U, V ==
- Darrin Verhagen
- Vision Eternel
- VNV Nation

== W ==
- Wardruna
- Steven Wilson
- Adam Wingard
- Wrekmeister Harmonies
- Wumpscut

== X - Z ==
- Luca Yupanqui
- Akira Yamaoka

== See also ==
- List of ambient music artists
- List of drone artists
- List of experimental musicians
- List of industrial music bands
- List of noise musicians
