= List of fictional immortals =

This is a list of notable fictional immortals. According to literary scholars and psychologists, immortal characters in fiction appeal to consumers, in part to ease their existential anxiety while also encouraging contemplation of how to live fully during their finite lifetimes.

== A ==
- Agamemnon
- Ainur (Middle-earth)
- Alexander Corvinus
- Richard Alpert (Lost)
- Alucard (Hellsing)
- Amanda (Highlander)
- Angel (Buffy)
- Angelique Bouchard Collins
- Aphrodite (Xena and Hercules)
- Apocalypse (character)
- Aragami (film)
- Arawn Death-Lord
- Archer & Armstrong
- Architect (The Matrix)
- Ares (Hercules and Xena)
- Armand (The Vampire Chronicles)
- Ashildr (Doctor Who)
- Atalanta (Pantheon)
- Avatars (Charmed)
- Ayesha (novel)
- Azazel (Supernatural)

== B ==
- Barbas (Charmed)
- Kurt Barlow
- Baš Čelik
- Bicentennial Man (film)
- Maureen Birnbaum, Barbarian Swordsperson
- The Boat of a Million Years
- Tom Bombadil (Middle-Earth)
- Brunnen-G
- Bungle (Rainbow)

== C ==
- C.C. (Code Geass)
- Princess Cadance
- Callisto (Xena)
- Captain Scarlet (character)
- Carl Brutananadilewski
- John Carter of Mars
- Casca (series)
- Castiel (Supernatural)
- Princess Celestia
- Celestial Toymaker
- Chia Black Dragon
- Chucky (Child's Play)
- Chử Đồng Tử
- Mort Cinder
- Claudia (The Vampire Chronicles)
- Coeurl
- Barnabas Collins
- Quentin Collins
- Coop (Charmed)
- Michael Corvin
- Marcus Corvinus
- Edward Cullen
- Esme Cullen
- Carlisle Cullen
- Emmet Cullen

== D ==
- Damien Darkblood
- Darius (Highlander)
- Darla (Buffy the Vampire Slayer)
- Dawn (comics)
- Deadpool
- The Deaths of Ian Stone
- Demona
- The Doctor
- Doomguy
- Claudia Donovan (Warehouse 13)
- Drusilla (Buffy the Vampire Slayer)

== E ==
- Errand of Mercy
- Eru Ilúvatar
- Eve (Angel)

== F ==
- The Fairy with Turquoise Hair
- Hugh Fitzcairn (Highlander)
- Maryann Forrester (True Blood)
- Four Horsemen (Highlander)
- Frankenstein's monster
- Frylock

== G ==
- Hob Gadling
- Gamzee Makara (Homestuck)
- Gandalf
- Garlic Jr.
- Ghost Rider
- Thánh Gióng
- Mister Gone
- Godzilla
- Thalia Grace (Percy Jackson)
- Dorian Gray

== H ==
- Jasper Hale
- Rosalie Hale
- Jessica Hamby
- Han Chieh (Agent from Above)
- Han Li (A Record of Mortal's Journey to Immortality)
- Jack Harkness (Doctor Who)
- Heggra
- Hidan (Naruto)

== I ==
- Duncan Idaho (Dune)
- Imhotep (character)
- Immortal (Highlander)
- The Immortal (short story)
- Immortal Rain
- Isaac and Miria

== J ==
- Jareth
- Jazinda
- Jeepers Creepers (2001 film)
- John the Apostle (Mormonism)
- Davy Jones (Pirates of the Caribbean)

== K ==
- Kai (LEXX)
- Kaim Argonar
- Kane (Command & Conquer)
- Kane (fantasy)
- Yasunori Katō
- Kayako Saeki
- Rama Khan
- Nick Knight (Forever Knight)
- Koschei
- Karl Ruprecht Kroenen
- Freddy Krueger
- Kurgan (Highlander)
- Kratos (God of War)

== L ==
- La Belle Dame sans Merci
- Nicolas de Lenfent
- Tabitha Lenox
- Lestat de Lioncourt
- Liễu Hạnh
- Lilith (30 Days of Night)
- Lazarus Long (Methuselah's Children)
- Locke the Superman
- Long Live Walter Jameson (Twilight Zone)
- Lord Fear
- Lorien (Babylon 5)
- Princess Luna (My Little Pony)

== M ==
- Macbeth (Gargoyles)
- Connor MacLeod (Highlander)
- Duncan MacLeod (Highlander)
- Helen Magnus (Sanctuary)
- Emilia Marty/Ellian MacGregor/Elina Makropulos (The Makropulos Affair)
- Man in Black (Lost)
- Mao (Mao)
- Master (Buffy the Vampire Slayer)
- Master (Doctor Who)
- Rex Matheson (Torchwood)
- Kenny McCormick
- The Medallion
- Melkor
- Merlin
- Mermaid Saga
- Ming the Merciless
- Miri (Star Trek)
- Mnemosyne (anime)
- The Modern World (novel)
- Daniel Molloy
- Adam Monroe
- Dr. Henry Morgan (Forever)
- Mumm-Ra
- Michael Myers (Halloween)

== N ==
- Three Nephites (Mormonism)
- Nero
- No Present Like Time
- Nome King

== O ==
- Oberon
- Oberon's children
- Ōgon Bat
- John Oldman (The Man from Earth)
- Eben Olemaun
- Stella Olemaun
- The Omega Glory
- Oracle (The Matrix)
- Orlando

== P ==
- Pamela Swynford De Beaufort
- Pandora (1998 novel)
- Kenneth Parcell
- Paris (Pantheon)
- Pazuzu (The Exorcist)
- Peter Pan
- Pinhead (Hellraiser)
- Plato's Stepchildren
- Louis de Pointe du Lac
- Puck (A Midsummer Night's Dream)
- Pug (fictional character)
- List of Puppet Master characters

== Q ==
- Q (Star Trek)
- Q Continuum (Star Trek)
- Queen of the Nile (The Twilight Zone)

== R ==
- Juan Sánchez Villa-Lobos Ramírez (Highlander)
- Ra's al Ghul
- Rat King
- Jesse Reeves
- Return to Tomorrow
- Perry Rhodan
- Ben Richards (The Immortal)
- Michael Roa Valdamjong
- Romãozinho
- Richie Ryan (Highlander)
- Ryuk (Death Note)
- Roger (American Dad!)

== S ==
- Takeo Saeki
- Toshio Saeki
- Sailor Moon (character)
- Santanico Pandemonium
- Vandal Savage
- The Seer (Charmed)
- Selene (Underworld)
- Master Shake
- She: A History of Adventure
- Shinigami (Death Note)
- Signum (Nanoha)
- Skeleton Man
- Slappy the Dummy
- Arvin Sloane (Alias)
- Sons of the Dark
- Sorceress of Castle Grayskull
- The Source (Charmed)
- Space Ghost
- Space Seed
- Spike (Buffy the Vampire Slayer)
- Springtrap
- Starscream
- Stingy Jack
- Struldbrug
- Sun Wukong
- Bella Swan
- Salem

== T ==
- Tản Viên Sơn Thánh
- Tarzan (Tarzan's Quest)
- Thirteen Ghosts
- Tiffany Valentine
- Tom Bombadil
- Torquemada (comics)
- Triad (Charmed)
- Tuck Family (Tuck Everlasting)
- Cole Turner
- Will Turner

== V ==
- Vandal Savage
- Velasca
- Vicente (30 Days of Night)
- Vita (Nanoha)
- Jason Voorhees

== W ==
- Wandering Jew
- White Witch
- Who Mourns for Adonais?
- Mayor Richard Wilkins (Buffy the Vampire Slayer)
- Winzy (The Mortal Immortal)
- Wisdom's Daughter
- Wolf in the Fold
- Nick Wolfe (Highlander: The Raven)
- Wonder Woman
- Wormhole Aliens (The prophets - Star Trek: Deep Space Nine)
- Wowbagger the Infinitely Prolonged
- Wraith (Stargate)
- Leo Wyatt (Charmed)

== Y ==
- Sadako Yamamura
- The Year of Our War
- Nathan Young

== Z ==
- Zamasu (Dragon Ball Super)
- Zorak

== See also ==
- Immortality in fiction
- List of Highlander characters
