= Radio Rivendell =

- Broadcast area: International
- Frequency: Live Stream

Programming
- Format: Internet Radio

Ownership
- Owner: Anders Dahlgren

History
- First air date: 2001

Links
- Website: www.radiorivendell.com

Radio Rivendell is a non-commercial, non-profit Internet radio station dedicated to playing fantasy music.

== History ==
Radio Rivendell is an Internet radio station dedicated to playing dark ambient, orchestral, neofolk, video game music, and fantasy music. The station is named after the Elven outpost Rivendell, a fictional realm created by J. R. R. Tolkien.

Streamed 24 hours a day in a variety of formats, the station has been online since 2001. It plays music mainly from royalty-free soundtracks to role-playing video games and up-and-coming independent artists who submit their fantasy music to be played online. Along with the music is an online discussion forum. Listeners who register for free can post to the forum, rate the music, and vote in the annual "Fantasy Awards".

Based in Sweden, the station began when Anders Dahlgren (screen name "Lord Elrond") and his friends wanted ambient background music to supplement their role-playing game (RPG) sessions. After trying various CDs, Dahlgren began to experiment with broadcasting music over the Internet using a SHOUTcast server. Soon, listeners from around the world were tuning in.

In 2005, Swedish label Waerloga Records asked Radio Rivendell to help recruit artists for their dark fantasy compilation CD, A Tribute to Uglakh. In 2007, the station once again paired with Waerloga to produce the first Radio Rivendell Compilation, an anthology of 16 fantasy tracks. Radio Rivendell Compilation, vol. 2: The Book of War was released in April 2008. This time the 17 tracks were linked by a single storyline of an epic battle between a dark lord and a noble captain.

On January 9, 2008, Sci Fi Weekly, the ezine of T.V.'s Sci Fi Channel, named Radio Rivendell its "Site of the Week".

On March 12, 2009, Dahlgren's alter-ego Gargrim The Liar released his debut CD Stories of Long Forgotten, together with The Challenge by Swedish band Anabasis, in a double CD compilation from Waerloga Records called Two Worlds. Artwork includes a cover illustration by noted fantasy artist John Howe.

On August 16, 2010, Radio Rivendell released an official iPhone Application.

The station is financed mainly by donations and the sale of compilation cds.

== Albums ==
Since 2005, Radio Rivendell has collaborated with Waerloga Records on a series of compilation cds.

A Tribute to Uglakh (2005) musicians include: Za Frûmi, Cryo, Balaghan, Alvskugga, Autumn tears, Musterion, Encryption, Patrice Deceuninck, OverCoat, Atrium Carceri, Rising Shadows, Vurpa, The Soil Bleeds Black, Vox Vulgaris, Unto Ashes, Abnocto, Sagor & Swing, Volstoj, and Vagrant's Steps.

Radio Rivendell Compilation (2007) musicians include: Markus Holler, Erdenstern, Sean Beeson, Wilbert Roget, II, Gargrim The Liar, Dimitrij Volstoj, Sibelian, Tom W Hall, Abnocto, Balaghan, Lost Kingdom, Rising Shadows, Tincolindo, Project Morfeo, Morgan the bard, and Helen Trevillion.

Radio Rivendell Compilation, vol. 2: The Book of War (2008) musicians include: Sean Beeson, Zmei Gorinich, Erdenstern, Sully Koba, A journey of the mind, Unto Ashes, Gargrim The Liar, Sibelian, Markus Holler, Dimitrij Volstoj, Za Frûmi, Lost Kingdom, Anabasis, Peter Szwach, Encryption, Ataraxia, and Dråm. Story by Simon Kölle and Kris Swank.

Two Worlds: Anabasis & Gargrim The Liar (2009) musicians include: Gargrim The Liar, Anabasis. Cover art by John Howe.
