= Waerloga Records =

Swedish record label

Waerloga Records is a small Swedish record label focused on dark ritualistic fantasy music. Records are available through mailorder and several stores worldwide. The label also have a Mailorder Store selling related releases, rare soundtracks etc.

== Bands on the label ==
- Za Frûmi
- Encryption
- Abnocto
- Daniel & Mikael Tjernberg
- Lost Kingdom
- Anabasis
- Gargrim the Liar
- Aardia
- Simon Kölle

Other releases sold by Waerloga are in alphabetic order: Alvskugga, Atrium Carceri, Autumn Tears, Balahgan, Cryo, Dimitrij Volstoj, Erdenstern, Gargrim the Liar, Helen Trevillion, Lost Kingdom, Markus Holler, Morgan the bard, Musterion, Overcoat, Patrice Deceuninck, Project Morfeo, Rising Shadows, Sagor och Swing, Sean Beeson, Sibelian, The Soil Bleeds Black, Tincolindo, Tom W Hall, Unto Ashes, Vagrants steps, Volstoj, Vox Vulgaris, Vurpa and Wilbert Roget, II

Waerloga Records has recently collaborated on a series of compilation CDs with fantasy-based Swedish internet radio station, Radio Rivendell, including A Tribute to Uglakh (2005), Radio Rivendell Compilation (2007), and Radio Rivendell Compilation, vol. 2: The Book of War (2008). Artists contributing to these CDs include many of those listed in the paragraph above, as well as others.

== See also ==
- List of record labels
