= Ptah (disambiguation) =

Ptah is a god in Egyptian mythology.

Ptah may also refer to:

- 5011 Ptah, a near-Earth asteroid discovered in 1960
- Ptah, a crater on Ganymede, a moon of Jupiter.
- Ptah-Du-Auu, an Egyptian priest who lived during his kingdom's 4th dynasty
- Merit-Ptah, an Egyptian female doctor of the 2nd dynasty, or possibly a 20th century fabrication
- Ptahil, creator of the material universe in Mandaeism
- Ptahil (album), an album released by Atrium Carceri
- Ptah, the El Daoud, an album released by Alice Coltrane
- P'Taah, one of the aliases of musician Chris Brann
- Phosphotungstic acid-haematoxylin stain, shorthand usage of PTAH

== See also ==
- PTA
