= PTAS =

PTAS or Ptas may refer to:

- Polynomial-time approximation scheme, an approximation algorithm in computer science
- Pesetas, Spanish currency
- PTAS reduction, an approximation-preserving reduction in computational complexity theory
- Preferential trading area, another term for a trade bloc

== See also ==
- PTA (disambiguation)
