= Austerity (disambiguation) =

Austerity is a policy of deficit-cutting, which by definition requires lower spending, higher taxes, or both.

Austerity or Austere may also refer to:

== Music ==
- Austere, a now-defunct Australian black metal duo that featured Tim Yatras as a member
- Austere (EDM group), an ambient electronic music group from Portland, Oregon
- Austere (EP), a 2002 EP by Sparta
- "Austere" (song), a 2008 song by The Joy Formidable

== Steam locomotives ==
- Hunslet Austerity 0-6-0ST
- SR Q1 class
- WD Austerity 2-8-0
- WD Austerity 2-10-0

== See also ==
- 1980s austerity policy in Romania
- Asceticism, a lifestyle characterized by abstinence and austerity from various sorts of worldly pleasures often with the aim of pursuing religious and spiritual goals
- Austerity in Israel
- Special Period, Cuba
