= Immortality in fiction =

Immortality applied as an element in works of fiction

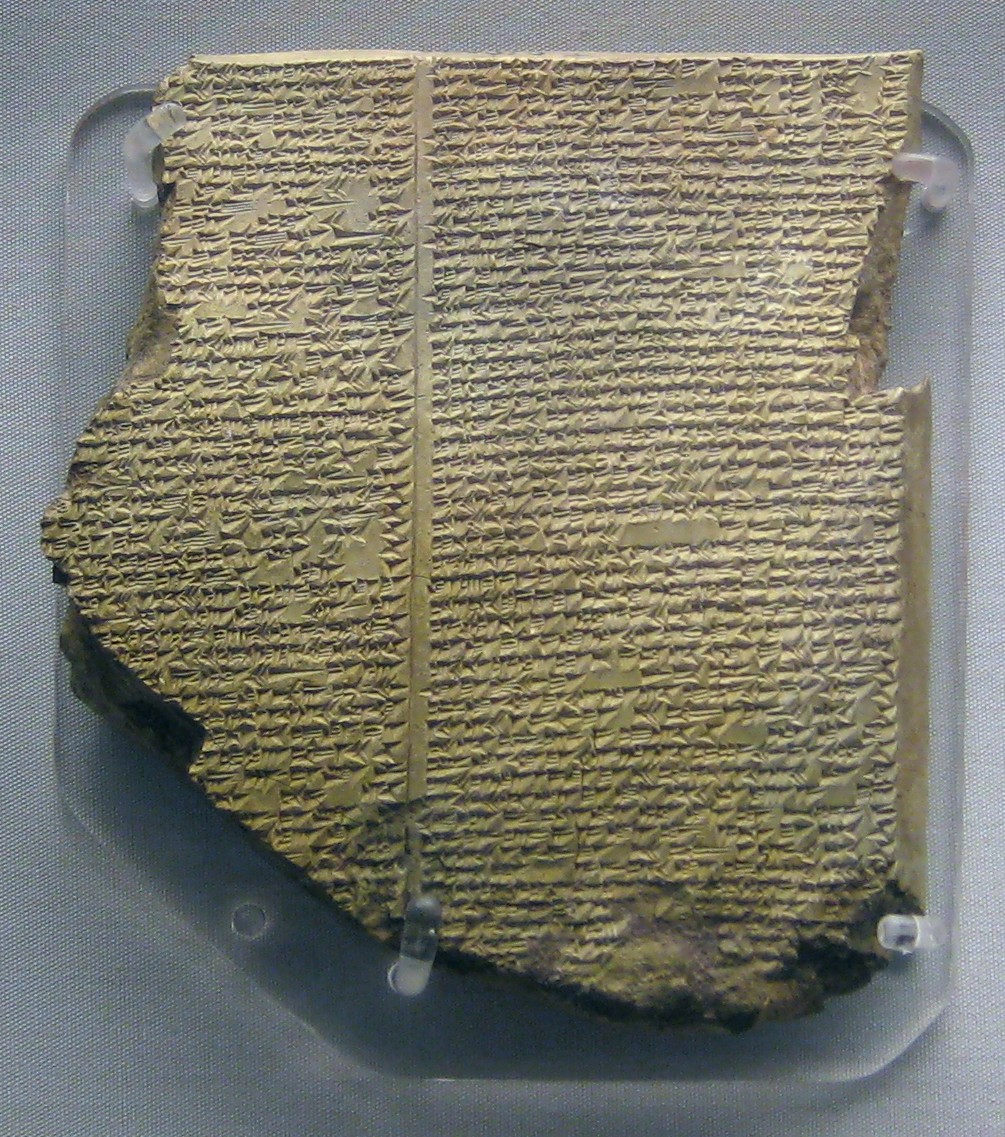
The Epic of Gilgamesh is the earliest known appearance of the concept of immortality in fiction.

Immortality is a common theme in fiction. The concept has been depicted since the Epic of Gilgamesh, the oldest known work of fiction. Originally appearing in the domain of mythology, it has later become a recurring element in the genres of horror, science fiction, and fantasy. For most of literary history, the dominant perspective has been that the desire for immortality is misguided, albeit strong; among the posited drawbacks are ennui, loneliness, and social stagnation. This view was challenged in the 20th century by writers such as George Bernard Shaw and Roger Zelazny. Immortality is commonly obtained either from supernatural entities or objects such as the Fountain of Youth or through biological or technological means such as brain transplants.

== History ==
The oldest known fictional account of immortality is also the oldest surviving work of fiction: the Epic of Gilgamesh, an ancient Sumerian tale from c. 2100 BCE. Several Greek myths of antiquity depict mortals such as Ganymede and Tithonus being granted everlasting life by the gods. Influenced by Taoist philosophical thought, Chinese fiction has featured immortality since at least the 1500s. Several historical figures have been portrayed as immortals after their deaths, including Nicolas Flamel and the Count of St. Germain. In Arthurian literature, Sir Galahad attains immortality through the Holy Grail. In medieval Europe, the Christian legend of the Wandering Jew emerged, wherein a man is cursed to live forever for a slight against Jesus. This story was then reworked over and over again by numerous authors across the centuries, well past the end of the Middle Ages and into the 1800s, with Johann Wolfgang von Goethe and Alexandre Dumas each making their own version which both remain unfinished. The 1800s also saw several Gothic stories of the downsides of immortality. Progress in the field of medicine inspired science fiction stories about immortality in the late 1800s and early 1900s; most of these took a dim view of the prospect of eternal life but more positive attitudes also appeared. By the 1930s, opinions were divided into camps with favourable and unfavourable views on immortality, with authors such as Neil R. Jones and Laurence Manning writing stories where it presents opportunities and others such as D. D. Sharp and Damon Knight depicting it as a cause of stagnation. This division continued at least until the 1960s. Following research into biotechnology and cryonics, the conception that not having to die of old age might soon be a medical reality gained popularity—reflected in the non-fiction works The Prospect of Immortality by Robert Ettinger from 1964 and Conquest of Death by Alvin Silverstein from 1979—and since at least the 1980s, there has been a trend of more analytical treatments of immortality in fiction, as well as contes philosophiques.

== Types ==
Struldbruggs, immortals without eternal youth

Depictions of immortality vary in a number of ways. The common feature across all types is indefinitely prolonged lifespans. The absence of ageing—i.e. eternal youth—is typically also involved, though some exceptions such as the Greek myth of Tithonus and the Struldbruggs of Jonathan Swift's 1726 novel Gulliver's Travels exist. It may or may not entail being insusceptible to dying from injuries; to distinguish between the concepts, immortality without this property may be referred to by other terms such as emortality, a term used by Alan Harrington and Alvin Silverstein, or postmortality, a term used by Michael Hauskeller. Carol Zaleski distinguishes between several different types of immortality, principally physical immortality—or "everlasting longevity"—and immortality of the soul, where the latter is further subdivided by other features such as whether it is inherent or needs to be acquired. It is mainly physical immortality that appears in fiction, immortality of the soul being mostly found in the domains of religion and philosophy.

The most common form of immortality is that of one individual living a single life, but there are also stories featuring multiple beings fusing into an immortal entity—such as Greg Bear's 1985 novel Blood Music—and stories of one individual living multiple lives in succession in a manner akin to reincarnation. Complete immunity to death is uncommon outside of religious contexts and is usually non-corporeal in nature. Science fiction occasionally features immortality not of living beings, but of the entire universe by overcoming the issues caused by entropy preventing self-perpetuation; the 1972 novel The Gods Themselves by Isaac Asimov is one example.

Undeath, seen for instance in zombies and vampires, is sometimes considered a form of immortality, and sometimes viewed as a separate concept. Occasionally, vampires are considered immortal in contrast to zombies being viewed as undead. Vampiric immortality is characterized by being conditional, inasmuch as continued access to human blood is necessary to sustain it. Zombie immortality, on the other hand, is characterized by the loss of personhood.

Works of fiction featuring immortality can be classified by the number of immortals: one, several, or everyone. Works with lone immortals can be further subdivided into those where the immortality is a secret and those where it is not. Conversely, the 1990 novella Outnumbering the Dead by Frederik Pohl features a lone mortal in a world where everyone else is immortal, as does the 2009 film Mr. Nobody.

== Narrative function ==
Authors often use immortality as a theme in fictional narratives to explore its consequences on society and the individual as a thought experiment. For many of these stories, the purpose is to serve as a cautionary tale. It is also used for social commentary and as the basis for both utopian and dystopian fiction. In other works it functions as a MacGuffin, providing motivation for characters as a goal to strive towards. Immortality is sometimes used to enable telling stories that span a period of time longer than a normal human lifespan without replacing the main characters. Occasionally, it is only a background feature used to suggest high levels of scientific and technological advancement.

== Means ==
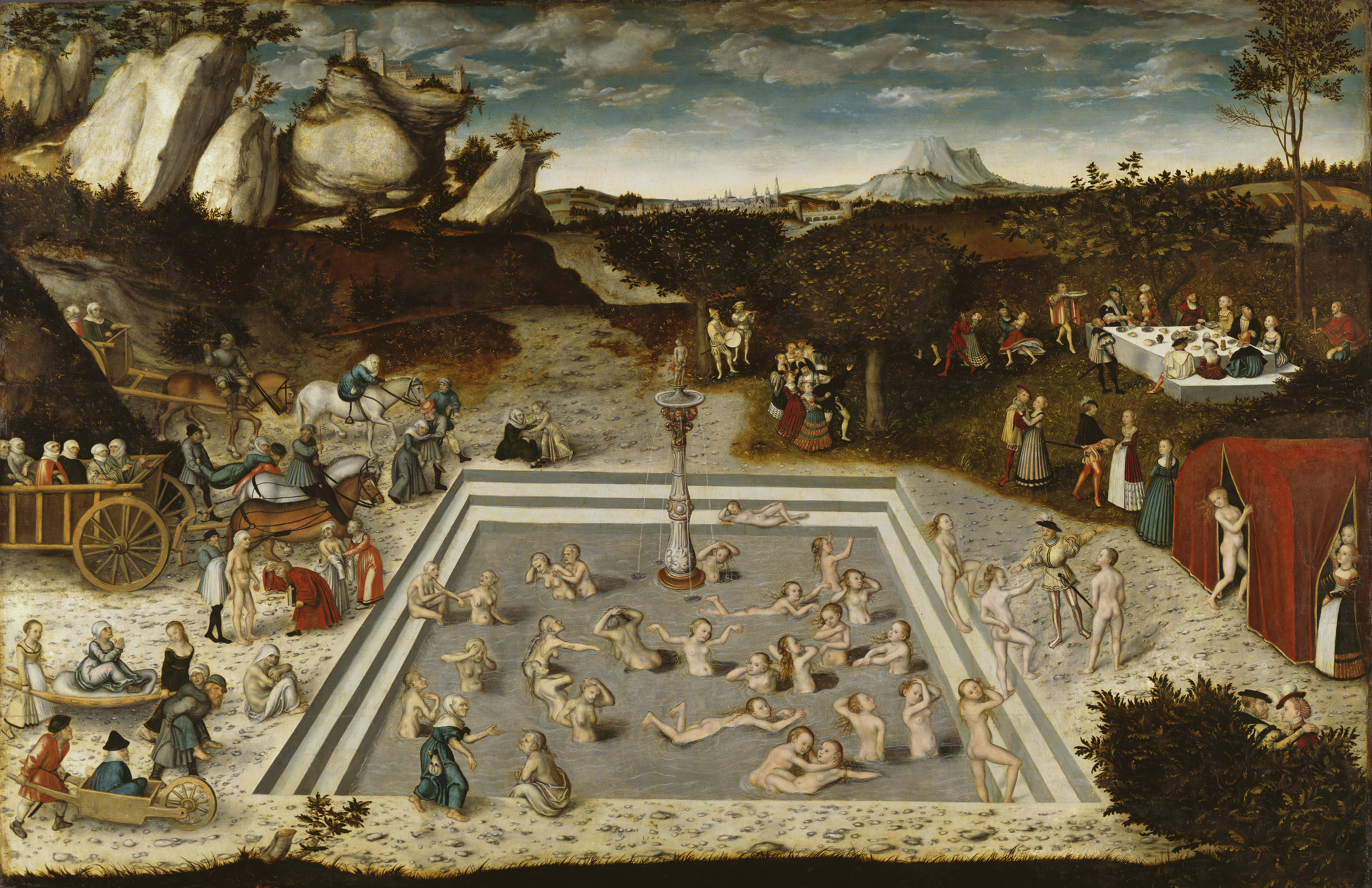
The Fountain of Youth is a traditional means of obtaining immortality.

The means by which immortality is obtained are varied, ranging from the traditional Fountain of Youth and elixir of life to advanced medicine and technology. Some authors assume that scientific progress will eventually lead to immortality, and for this reason humans living in the far future are often depicted as having attained this goal, including in Arthur C. Clarke's 1956 novel The City and the Stars. A common motif is that of immortality obtained through the deaths of others. Examples include numerous vampire stories where the vampires' immortality is sustained by drinking human blood, the 2011 film In Time where lifetime is transferred from the multitude of poor to the wealthy elite such that the immortality of the few depends on the deaths of the many, and Norman Spinrad's 1969 novel Bug Jack Barron where the source of immortality is derived from the tissues of murdered children.

=== Biological and medical ===
Immortality is accomplished by selective breeding and eugenics in works like the 1942 novel Methuselah's Children by Robert A. Heinlein and the 1930 novel Last and First Men by Olaf Stapledon. Prior to the first successful blood transfusions, some stories in the late 1800s featured the idea that such procedures would have a rejuvenating effect granting extended lifespans, including Robert Duncan Milne's A Man Who Grew Young Again from 1887; Georges Eekhoud's 1884 story Le coeur de Tony Wandel (Tony Wandel's Heart) uses heart transplants in a similar manner. Blood is also the source of immortality in James E. Gunn's 1962 novel The Immortals, where a genetic mutation gives rise to blood that confers immortality, which others consequently seek to obtain. Other works have also occasionally depicted immortality as being obtained congenitally or unintentionally; certain fantasy creatures such as the Elves in the legendarium of J. R. R. Tolkien are inherently immortal, the title character of the 2007 film The Man from Earth is an otherwise ordinary human who stopped ageing for unknown reasons some 14,000 years ago, and René Barjavel's 1973 novel Le Grand Secret revolves around the discovery of a highly contagious virus that confers immortality on those who are infected. In the 2005 short story "The Reincarnated Giant" by Chinese author Wang Jinkang, immortality is attainable by replacing aged body parts one at a time. Symbiosis with other lifeforms, typically alien ones, causes immortality in some stories. Examples include George R. R. Martin's 1974 short story "A Song for Lya", F. Paul Wilson's 1976 novel Healer, and Anne McCaffrey's 1982 novel Crystal Singer. Drugs that extend life indefinitely by stopping the process of ageing are depicted in James Blish's 1956 novel They Shall Have Stars, Frank Herbert's 1965 novel Dune, and Poul Anderson's 1966 novel World Without Stars, among others.

=== Technological ===
Immortality is accomplished by way of medical nanobots in Jeffrey Carver's 1989 novel From a Changeling Star. In Joe Haldeman's 1974 novel The Forever War, immortality is caused by paradoxes arising from time travel. Immortality of the mind is sometimes accomplished by periodically moving it to a new physical body, transferring either just the consciousness as in A. E. van Vogt's 1948 novel The World of Null-A or transplanting the entire brain as in Michael G. Coney's 1974 novel Friends Come in Boxes; the new body is a clone of the original person in some works such as John Varley's 1977 novel The Ophiuchi Hotline and an entirely different person in others such as the 2017 film Get Out. Similarly, personality traits are transferred from one person to another using the malaria parasite as a vector to attain a form of immortality in Indian author Amitav Ghosh's 1995 novel The Calcutta Chromosome.

==== Digital ====
A common theme in cyberpunk is digital immortality, achieved by transferring a person's consciousness to a computer. One version of this concept involves the uploaded mind being conscious inside the machine, as in William Gibson's Sprawl trilogy starting with the 1984 novel Neuromancer. Attitudes towards this kind of existence vary between and within stories. The argument that it should be no more unappealing than having artificial body parts is made in Damien Broderick's 2002 novel Transcension, while in John Crowley's 1979 novel Engine Summer it is viewed as a type of imprisonment. In Frederik Pohl's 1977–2004 novel series the Heechee Saga, one character enjoys the capabilities afforded by having vast computational power available directly to the mind, whereas another dreads the prospect of serving the entirety of a millennia-long prison sentence. In Greg Egan's 2002 novel Schild's Ladder the digital existence is so convincing it can be mistaken for the physical world, and Egan's 1994 novel Permutation City raises the issue of whether an uploaded mind is the same person or merely a copy. Another version of the concept is seen in Arthur C. Clarke's The City and the Stars, where the uploaded minds are kept in storage without consciousness for transfer to a new body as one becomes available and then uploaded again when the body dies, allowing for an unlimited number of sequential lifetimes.

==== Cryonics ====
Cryonic freezing is used as a means to extend life until such a time that immortality is expected to be available in some stories such as Brian Stableford's 1986 short story "And He Not Busy Being Born...". Science fiction writers have generally had a pessimistic outlook on this idea, foreseeing various problems; immortality does not become available within the promised time frame in Clifford D. Simak's 1967 novel Why Call Them Back from Heaven?, everything works as intended but society has changed for the worse in the intervening period in Anders Bodelsen's 1969 novel Freezing Point (Frysepunktet), and the preserved bodies are exploited for their organs in Larry Niven's 1973 short story "The Defenseless Dead".

=== Supernatural and magical ===
The alchemical substance known as the philosopher's stone is credited with being able to grant everlasting life in stories such as William Godwin's 1799 novel St. Leon. In Natalie Babbitt's 1975 novel Tuck Everlasting, a family becomes immortal after drinking from a magical spring. Magic users are often immortal, and magic itself may be the cause of their immortality. The magical Land of Oz in L. Frank Baum's Oz series confers immortality on those living there, and similarly the towns of Tukwan and Levensvale in Ghanaian author Kojo Laing's 1988 magical realist novel Woman of the Aeroplanes are immortal by virtue of existing outside of ordinary time. Immortality is sometimes bestowed upon humans by deities (as in the Greek myth of Ganymede) or aliens (as in Clifford D. Simak's 1963 novel Way Station), or received through a deal with the Devil; the title character of Oscar Wilde's 1890 novel The Picture of Dorian Gray has a portrait that ages in his stead as the result of inadvertently making such a deal. The legend of the ghost ship the Flying Dutchman involves immortality being handed down as divine retribution for the captain's blasphemy. Several stories exist in which universal immortality is caused by the personification of Death being (temporarily) incapacitated in some way, including T. F. Powys' 1931 novel Unclay and the 1939 film On Borrowed Time.

== Outcomes ==
The outcomes of immortality range from a blessing to a curse for the individual, and from utopian to dystopian for society. Science fiction tends to explore the means by which immortality is attained and occasionally the consequences for individual people, whereas fantasy usually delves more into the enduring societal effects and questions of morality.

=== Negative ===
For the most part, immortality is portrayed as strongly desired yet not truly desirable, and the stories it appears in commonly function as a kind of cautionary tale. Some stories such as Argentinian author Jorge Luis Borges' 1947 short story "The Immortal" and Patrick O'Leary's 2002 novel The Impossible Bird go so far as to show immortals seeking to regain their mortality. Says Brian Stableford, "When the immortal condition seems perfectly satisfactory in itself, however, the world tends to be found wanting".

==== Physical and psychological ====
Overwhelming ennui or restlessness is often depicted as an inevitable consequence of everlasting life. Satirical treatments of the lengths immortal beings might go to in order to stave off boredom are found in Michael Moorcock's 1970s The Dancers at the End of Time series and Douglas Adams' 1982 novel Life, the Universe and Everything; in the latter, the character Wowbagger the Infinitely Prolonged spends eternity travelling the universe to insult every living being to their face in alphabetical order. Another issue faced by immortals in some works is physical deterioration, either due to ongoing natural senescence or as a direct side-effect of immortality itself, the latter appearing in Aldous Huxley's 1939 story After Many a Summer Dies the Swan where the immortals slowly transform into ape-like creatures and Bob Shaw's 1970 novel One Million Tomorrows where immortality causes impotence. While remaining forever childlike in spirit as well as body makes J. M. Barrie's Peter Pan carefree and joyful, it also leaves him self-centred and unable to form meaningful lasting relationships. On the other hand, the mismatch of having an ageing mind in an eternally youthful body is a cause of distress in multiple stories of child vampires, and the 1996 novel Holy Fire by Bruce Sterling similarly portrays regaining youth in old age by means of rejuvenation as having unsettling effects on the psyche. A different psychological side-effect of immortality depicted in some works such as the aforementioned In Time, the works of Roger Zelazny, and Andrei Irkutov's 1924 short story "Immortality" is an increased fear of death, immortal life being "too precious to risk". The Nameless One, the player character in the 1999 Dungeons & Dragons video game Planescape: Torment, has amnesia along with immortality; injuries that would have been fatal were it not for his immortality instead cause him to lose consciousness to later awaken without any memories. Regularly recurring (and thus, functionally, anterograde) amnesia is a side-effect of immortality in a different way in John R. Pierce's 1944 short story "Invariant", the consequence of restoring both the body and the mind to a previous state, while one-time (and thus functionally retrograde) amnesia is a side-effect of an immortality treatment in Christopher Priest's 1981 novel The Affirmation, and continuous loss of the oldest memories due to the brain's storage capacity being exceeded appears in Michael Flynn's 1994 short story "Melodies of the Heart".

==== Religious ====
In Richard Cowper's 1983 short story "The Tithonian Factor", it is discovered that the afterlife is real, to the chagrin of those who had already acquired immortality when the discovery was made. Similarly, the aforementioned Le Grand Secret depicts a character having a strong aversion to the prospect of immortality because it would preclude the reincarnation necessary to attain enlightenment according to their Hindu faith. Immortality also conflicts with reincarnation in the 1967 short story "The Vitanuls" by John Brunner; the lack of death results such a shortage of souls that children are eventually born without a soul.

==== Social and political ====
In works where immortality is not universal, the immortal ones encounter the drawback of outliving their loved ones, depicted for instance in Mary Shelley's 1833 short story "The Mortal Immortal", whereas fictional societies with universal immortality are inherently susceptible to overpopulation, as seen in Le Grand Secret and Richard Wilson's 1965 short story "The Eight Billion". Authors often couple immortality with infertility to get around the latter problem. On the other hand, the absence of reproduction among immortals is also depicted as causing population-wide problems in some works—one example being societal stagnation in Algis Budrys' 1954 short story The End of Summer—and in David H. Keller's 1934 novel Life Everlasting the people demand an antidote to restore mortality and fertility both. Neil Bell's 1930 novel The Seventh Bowl depicts dire societal consequences when immortality drugs are introduced—not due to immortality itself, but rather due to the actions of those in power in response to the new technology as they seek to further their own goals. In the 1888 novel The Inner House by Walter Besant, these problems are combined: a life-extending treatment intended to provide additional yet still limited time for a select few instead results in the emergence of an authoritarian society where everyone's life is prolonged indefinitely and strict population control is enforced where the only births that are allowed are those replacing accidental deaths, resulting in social stagnation in the centuries that follow. In José Saramago's 2005 novel Death at Intervals, the unexpected cessation of all death in a society accustomed to its presence causes demographic problems, economic disruption, and shortages of both resources and space. In Moroccan author Mohammed Aziz Lahbabi's 1974 novel The Elixir of Life, the invention of the titular elixir results in exacerbated inequality, class conflict, and social unrest, in part because the poor are convinced that only the social elite will receive the elixir. In Egyptian author Tawfiq al-Hakim's 1947 short story "In the Year One Million", a future society that has eliminated death and disease is also devoid of love and the arts, leading the populace to rise up to reverse these developments in order to regain meaning; al-Hakim's 1958 play Voyage to Tomorrow was based on the short story and expands on its themes.

==== Moral ====
In works of horror, the cost of immortality is typically the loss of one's humanity. The moral cost of attaining immortality is viewed as unacceptable in some works where it hinges on the deaths of others. In Larry Niven's 1967 short story "The Jigsaw Man", immortality is achieved by organ transplants, but there is a chronic shortage of organs. For this reason, organs are harvested from executed criminals, which leads to use of the death penalty being expanded to include a wider variety of crimes to meet the demand, eventually including traffic violations.

==== Alienation ====
Alienation is a common consequence of immortality. Immortals in otherwise mortal societies often feel the need to hide their immortality lest they be locked up in a laboratory for study. This problem is faced by the immortal group of people in the aforementioned The Immortals by James Gunn as well as in the 1970 television series The Immortal inspired by Gunn's novel. The lone immortal title characters in the aforementioned The Man from Earth and the 2015 film The Age of Adaline additionally experience the loneliness of having to uproot their lives and move every ten years or so to keep the people around them from noticing that they do not age. In the 1974 novella "Born with the Dead" by Robert Silverberg, immortality is attained by being resurrected after death, and those that have gone through that procedure become estranged from the rest of society due to the emotional effects.

=== Positive ===
There are also works with enthusiastic or outright utopian visions of immortality, such as the 1928 novel My First Two Thousand Years by Paul Eldridge and George Sylvester Viereck which portrays the life of a lone immortal as being a position of privilege. In these positive depictions, immortality is typically not universal. A notable exception is George Bernard Shaw's 1921 story Back to Methuselah, which was repudiated by Karel Čapek who included a counterargument in the preface to his 1925 play The Makropoulos Secret. Eden Phillpotts' 1916 story The Girl and the Faun takes the position that the costs of immortality are outweighed by its benefits.

Soviet author Andrei Irkutov envisioned the advent of a proletarian revolution as a result of an immortality treatment being invented in his 1924 short story "Immortality". In the story, immortality is granted to those in power and their enforcers, whereas the workers have no interest in it as they do not wish to carry on their labour forever. Consequently, the immortals dare not fight back against the revolution for fear of losing their immortal lives.

In feminist science fiction, immortality presents an opportunity for women to overcome the constraints imposed on them by patriarchal structures. In the 1978 novel Up the Walls of the World by Alice Sheldon (pen name James Tiptree Jr.), an immortal cyborg uses her powers to promote feminist values. Octavia E. Butler's 1980 novel Wild Seed contrasts the different forms of immortality of its two immortal characters representing masculinity and femininity, respectively; the former relies on killing other people and taking over their bodies whereas the latter is a regenerative kind of immortality which can be used to help others. In both Up the Walls of the World and Wild Seed, immortality is portrayed as desirable provided that it is combined with love and togetherness.

=== Other ===
Other works take a more dispassionate and analytical view of immortality. The immortal life of The Man from Earth is portrayed as neither a curse nor a blessing, in contrast to writer Jerome Bixby's previous work on immortality—the 1969 Star Trek episode "Requiem for Methuselah". Robert Reed's 2004 alternate history work A Plague of Life examines the consequences of universal immortality on human evolution. Kate Wilhelm's 1983 novel Welcome, Chaos depicts the effects of immortality on the then-ongoing Cold War. Poul Anderson's 1989 novel The Boat of a Million Years posits that rather than immortals being stagnant and mortals changing, both can be either.

While there are a large number of stories where immortality enables the unscrupulous to consolidate power, the 1954 novel They'd Rather Be Right (a.k.a. The Forever Machine) by Mark Clifton and Frank Riley envisions a scenario where that cannot happen. In the story, there is a computer which can confer immortality on individuals. In doing so, it also alters their minds in a way that removes negative qualities and preconceived notions. The end result is that most people turn it down because they are not willing to give up their prejudices.

Jack Vance's 1956 novel To Live Forever reflects the author's belief that immortality is not inherently either good or bad, but rather that it depends on the surrounding circumstances. In the novel, immortality is only granted to those who have made the greatest contributions to society in order to avoid overpopulation. As a result, citizens spend their lives struggling to prove themselves worthy of this reward, and those who have received it subsequently lead cautious lives so as not to risk losing their hard-earned deathlessness to violence or accidents. An alternative to the constraints of this society is proposed within the story: using immortality to explore the cosmos.

With regard to the effect of immortality on one's personality, a couple of works have been suggested to demonstrate immortals being enabled to develop their masculine and feminine sides alike, and in contrast to the more common depiction of immortals as overcome with ennui, the works of Roger Zelazny portray them as insatiably curious. Zelazny likewise eschews the notion that stagnation is an inevitability for immortals, taking the opposite view that previous experiences enhance future ones and that there is consequently always more to learn and experience in order to grow as a person.

== See also ==
- List of fictional immortals
- Reincarnation in popular culture
- Transhumanism in fiction
- Xianxia – Chinese fantasy genre
