= Rivendell (disambiguation) =

Rivendell (also named Imladris) is a fictional place in the works of J.R.R. Tolkien.

Rivendell may also refer to:

- Radio Rivendell, an internet radio station which features mainly fantasy music from popular fantasy movies and computer games
- Rivendell Bicycle Works, a bicycle manufacturer and retailer based in Walnut Creek, California
- Rivendell Child, Adolescent and Family Unit located in Concord West, Australia
- "Rivendell", a song by Rush from Fly by Night
