= Reliquiae =

Reliquiae may refer to:

- Relics, objects of religious significance from the past
- Reliquiae (band), a German medieval folk rock band
- Reliquiae (album), a 2012 album by Atrium Carceri
