= Souyuan =

Studio album by Atrium Carceri
- Released: November 18, 2008
- Recorded: Sweden
- Genre: Dark ambient, Experimental
- Label: Cold Meat Industry
- Producer: Simon Heath

Atrium Carceri chronology
Ptahil (2007)	Souyuan (2008)	Phrenitis (2009)

Souyuan is the fifth album by Swedish dark ambient project Atrium Carceri. It was released on November 18, 2008, through Cold Meat Industry

== Reviews ==
"Though this album has the Carceri sound written all over it, it’s also a bit different. There is a fair share of rhythmic structures to be found, which isn’t strange with his work, but somehow it feels different. The sounds are more experimental and subliminal, with an occasional IDM-like approach. And it also has a more industrial feel than the other releases. The total atmosphere is like being in a disturbing asylum, like ‘Seishinbyouin’. Supposedly he did about three years to create this work, also with the aid of test listeners and observing their reactions. This seems a somewhat unusual process, but if it's true it sure did work! The sound is very scary with a lot of things happening in the background. And it's again an album where the musician behind it all is also a great storyteller; it does really feel that it's going somewhere, not just mere sounds, just like his other albums. A sonic movie of sorts"

== Track listing ==
No.	Title	Length
1.	"Perfect Tundra"	2:45
2.	"Alternate Sides"	2:08
3.	"A New Silence"	3:19
4.	"Identity Theft"	4:35
5.	"Curtain"	5:41
6.	"Spawning Pool"	3:27
7.	"Memory Lapse"	3:33
8.	"3 Holy Spires"	8:25
9.	"Communication"	5:42
10.	"First Steps"	4:10

== Personnel ==
- Simon Heath
