= Phrenitis (album) =

Studio album by Atrium Carceri
- Released: December 02, 2009
- Recorded: Sweden
- Genre: Dark ambient, Experimental
- Label: Cold Meat Industry
- Producer: Simon Heath

Atrium Carceri chronology
Souyuan (2008)	Phrenitis (2009)	Reliquiae (2012)

Phrenitis is the sixth album by Swedish dark ambient project Atrium Carceri. It was released on December 2, 2009, by Cold Meat Industry.

== Description ==
Phrenitis takes the listener to a twisted place where the walls between worlds are razed. The ruinous cities of wars long past, where time itself is but a prisoner and the warlords roaming their purgatorial halls are free to destroy the very foundations of the natural order.

'Phrenitis' is the 6th album of Atrium Carceri and is yet another step of the ever increasing Atrium Carceri wake up call. Simon Heath shows himself and the world, yet again, that no man is ever truly the master of their art unless they strive to evolve with it. The soundscapes he has created bypass the conscious mind, taking the listener deep into his pristine nightmare. The evolution of sound is spot-on and sets Atrium Carceri apart from other lazy dark ambient acts by being a truly diverse piece, replete with details upon details to make the illusion complete, and haunting compositions to make the mind yearn."

== Track listing ==
No.	Title	Length
1.	"Faces Of War"	5:30
2.	"Inside The City"	3:29
3.	"Surfacing"	2:44
4.	"Hypnosis"	2:53
5.	"Floating"	2:49
6.	"Eraser"	10:36
7.	"At The End Of Time"	4:24
8.	"Time Freeze"	5:50
9.	"The Circle Of 12"	4:05
10.	"Through The Loop"	4:08
11.	"The Way Back"	4:15
12.	"Sub Surface"	4:13
13.	"Reunion"	5:49
14.	"Resistance"	5:28

== Personnel ==
- Simon Heath
