= Ptahil (album) =

Album of Atrium Carceri

Studio album by Atrium Carceri
- Released: February 02, 2007
- Recorded: Sweden
- Genre: Dark ambient, Experimental
- Label: Cold Meat Industry
- Producer: Simon Heath

Atrium Carceri chronology
Kapnobatai (2005)	Ptahil (2007)	Souyuan (2008)

Ptahil is the fourth album by Swedish dark ambient project Atrium Carceri. It was released on February 2, 2007, through Cold Meat Industry.

== Reviews ==
According to a review:

The fourth album from composer Simon Heath (Sweden) ventures beyond the vestiges of your mortality, granting a fleeting glance at the world beyond the veil. As ever, Simon has reinvented the genre as well as himself with a unique ambience created from his ever-increasingly complex and obscure techniques of mental dissolution and musical innovation.

Atrium Carceri emerges from the vapours with yet another stunning release entitled Ptahil (fetahil). The obsidian citadel stands stoic, its forceful gaze forever over streets running rampant with the councils bidders, while the citadel of glass attracts the mindless reincarnates grasping at anything physical while their memories slowly burn away in the womb of their eternal home. The comforts of quiet lives forever washed away by a miasmic tidal wave of necrotic flesh, sagging, protean forms and the chill of the grave. This is a place where steel rusts and is forgotten, where flesh and the fleeting forms it inhabits are forever changed. Ptahil sees all, and forgets naught. Let your mind be stripped to the pulpy, undulating core with this darkened voyage into domains both dreadful and serenely beautiful.

== Track listing ==
No.	Title	Length
1.	"Quarantine" (Voice – Antonia Simonovic)	1:59
2.	"Entrance"	3:53
3.	"A Place to Call Home"	10:44
4.	"Observatory"	5:35
5.	"Memory Leak"	1:38
6.	"Reincarnation Chamber"	2:42
7.	"A Path Through Remembrance"	4:07
8.	"Static of the Kapnobatai"	10:18
9.	"Reborn"	4:01
10.	"The Council of Seven"	2:02
11.	"Meltdown"	3:01
12.	"Inside the Womb"	3:28
13.	"End Titles"	3:21

== Personnel ==
- Simon Heath
