= Alistair Rennie =

Scottish writer

- Education: University of Aberdeen; University of Edinburgh; University of Glasgow
- Known for: Novel, music, short stories
- Notable work: HardWeird (short story collection), BleakWarrior (novel), Exoplanetary (album), Archeoplanetary (album), Interplanetary (album), Shore Rituals (album), Xenoplanetary (album), Void Rituals (album)
- Website: alistairrennie.com

Alistair Rennie is a Scottish author of weird fantasy and horror fiction, known for his weird fantasy novel, BleakWarrior, published by Blood Bound Books in 2016, and his short story collection, HardWeird, published by Blood Bound Books in 2024. He lives in Edinburgh, Scotland, and has lived for ten years in Bologna, Italy. He is the creator of the dark ambient music project Ruptured World which released its first album, Exoplanetary, on the dark ambient music label Cryo Chamber (Simon Heath) in August 2018. Ruptured World has since released several albums, including Archeoplanetary (August 2019), Interplanetary (June 2020), Shore Rituals (April 2021), Xenoplanetary (January 2023), Void Rituals (February 2024) and Spacefold (October 2026). Rennie has also released an electronic music album under the name Exosferics, called Demiurgic Velocities of Arcane Signals, which was released in 2024 by the US-based record label Shady Ridge Records.

== Education ==
A former painter and decorator, Rennie studied literature at the University of Aberdeen and the University of Edinburgh and holds a PhD in literature based on the work of Robert Louis Stevenson and Canadian critic Northrop Frye. He also holds an M.Sc. in Sound Design and Audiovisual Practice from the University of Glasgow and a PhD in Music from the University of Aberdeen.

== Career ==
Rennie has published numerous short stories in several acclaimed anthologies and magazines, including the New Weird anthology, Weird Tales magazine, Electric Velocipede, Mythic Delirium and Shadowed Realms.

Author Jeff VanderMeer (who, together with Ann VanderMeer, published some of Rennie's earliest works) has said of him: "Without having any wish to start a new moment or movement, I'd call him kind of 'Next Weird'. His work is transgressive and hard-edged and yet sometimes also experimental, while the influences seem to be everything from, well, authors typified as New Weird to mainstream literary to graphic novels."

Rennie is also a musician and a creator of electronic dark ambient music. Under the name of Ruptured World, he released his first album, "Exoplanetary", with the dark ambient music label Cryo Chamber, run by Simon Heath of Atrium Carceri, in August 2018. Ruptured World released a second album with Cryo Chamber, called Archeoplanetary, in July 2019, and has since released several albums, including Interplanetary (June 2020), Shore Rituals (April 2021), Xenoplanetary (January 2023), Void Rituals (February, 2024) and Spacefold (October 2026). Rennie is also an electronic music producer who goes under the name of Exosferics. Exosferics released its debut album Demiurgic Velocities of Arcane Signals on Shady Ridge Records in September 2024.

== Bibliography ==
=== Short stories ===
- "Il Duca di Cesena" (2006), short story, in Electric Velocipede Issue #10 (edited by John Klima), Spilt Milk Press.
- "The Coup de Grâce" (2006), short story, in Shadowed Realms Issue #11 (edited by Angela Challis), Brimstone Press.
- "The Gutter Sees The Light That Never Shines" (March 2008), short story, in The New Weird (edited by Ann & Jeff VanderMeer), Tachyon Publications, ISBN 978-1-892391-55-1.
- "Recalled to the Wrath of Penda" (March 17, 2008), short story, in Fabulous Whitby (edited by Liz Williams & Sue Thomason), Fabulous Albion, ISBN 978-0-9558462-0-5.
- "BleakWarrior Meets the Sons of Brawl" (September–October 2008), short story, in Weird Tales Vol. 63, No. 4., Issue #351 (edited by Ann VanderMeer), Wildside Press, ISBN 978-1-4344-5032-6.
- "A Doom of My Own" (Winter 2008), short story, in Electric Velocipede Issue #15/16 (edited by John Klima).
- "A Little Piece of Me Will Die" (2012), short story, in Schlock Magazine.
- "The Carpet Seller's Recommendation" (June 15, 2013), short story, in Horror Without Victims (edited by D. F. Lewis), Megazanthus Press, ISBN 978-1-291-45143-6.
- "The Fear Seeker" (August 27, 2017), short story, in Walk on the Weird Side (NecronomiCon 2017 Anthology, edited by Joseph S. Pulver Sr.), LASC Press.
- "TerrorSluts for Eternity Versus the Ungodheads of the Interdimensionals" (May 1, 2017), short story, in DOA III (edited by Marc Ciccarone & Andrea Dawn), Blood Bound Books, ISBN 978-1-94025026-7.
- "The Island Brushed by Ghosts" (November 27, 2018), short story, in Mechanical Animals: Tales at the Crux of Creatures and Tech (edited by Selena Chambers & Jason Heller), Hex Publishers, ISBN 978-0-9997736-7-3.

=== Books ===
- BleakWarrior. Blood Bound Books. 2016. ISBN 978-1940250236.
- HardWeird. Blood Bound Books. 2024. ISBN 978-1940250670.

== Discography ==
=== Major releases ===
==== Studio albums ====
- Exoplanetary (2018)
- Archeoplanetary (2019)
- Interplanetary (2020)
- Shore Rituals (2021)
- Xenoplanetary (2023)
- Void Rituals (2024)
- Demiurgic Velocities of Arcane Signals (2024)
- Spacefold (2026)
