= Za Frûmi =

Swedish music group

- Origin: Sweden
- Genres: Dark ambient, Dark folk
- Years active: 2001–present
- Website: http://waerloga.com/portfolio/za-frumi/

Za Frûmi is a Swedish music group that was formed in 2000. The Group creates dark, fantasy-inspired music.

== History ==
Za Frûmi came about in 2000 and was formed by Simon Heath, Donald Persson, Simon Kölle; Donald Persson left in 2001. This kind of fantasy/dark waves/neo folk music, the Za Frûmi project, has never been tried before. The band is on the Waerloga records label, along with their other side project, Abnocto.

Simon Kölle also has his other side project, Musterion. Simon Heath has Atrium Carceri and Knaprika which he does with ex-Za Frûmi member, Donald Persson.

== Concept ==
Za Frûmi has two different branches with three CDs released in the first and two in the second. The first branch is called The Za Frûmi saga and is inspired by orcs and their language. It's almost possible to say that this branch is radio theatre with music, but the music is very important. Flutes, drums, ambient sound effects and Nordic folk music could be heard. The dialogue is in the orcs' language, called Black Speech.

The other branch is called Za Frûmi Legends and is 100% instrumental fantasy inspired music. The group released two albums in this branch. The first one is more general for the genre with dwarven wars, music from an Inn, trollish woods, haunted castles and cults. The second CD is inspired by two vampires.

The band can be heard on several compilations and the band has received tributes and been praised in the media all over the world; Wired magazine is one example.

== Members ==
- Simon Kölle (Abnocto, Musterion)
- Simon Heath (Abnocto, Atrium Carceri, Knaprika)

=== Former members ===
- Donald Persson (Za Shum Ushatar Uglakh and Tach - Chapter 2), until 2002.

== Discography ==
=== The Za Frûmi saga ===
The Za Frûmi saga consists of three albums by the band. The third was released on January 12, 2007. The saga is composed of a mixture of fantasy-inspired music and spoken dialogue, similar to radio theatre.

The first chapter of the saga: "Za shum ushatar Uglakh" (translated "The Great Warrior Uglakh") was released in 2000, and focuses on the adventures of a group of orcs, dagalush (smaller form of a goblin/orc) khapul (thin, orc-like creature), and slaves, who encounter a vampire. In "Tach" (translated "Bone"), the second chapter of the saga, which was released in 2001, the group begins a quest to find a bone staff, which has been divided into three parts. The chapter ends suddenly, mid-action, and was not resolved until the release of "Shrak ishi za migul" (translated "Gathering in the Mist") in January 2007.

- Za Shum Ushatar Uglakh (2000, Tarki records and later on re released on Waerloga records)
- Tach (2001, Waerloga records)
- Shrak Ishi za Migul (2007, Waerloga records)

=== Za Frûmi Legends ===
- Legends Act 1 (2002, Waerloga records)
- Legends Act 2 - Vampires (2004, Waerloga records)
- Legends Act 3 - Cults (2008, Waerloga records)
- Legends Act 4 - Orders (2008, Waerloga records)

=== Waerloga Compilation ===
- A Tribute to Uglakh (2005, Waerloga record)
