= Trepaneringsritualen =

Swedish industrial and dark ambient project

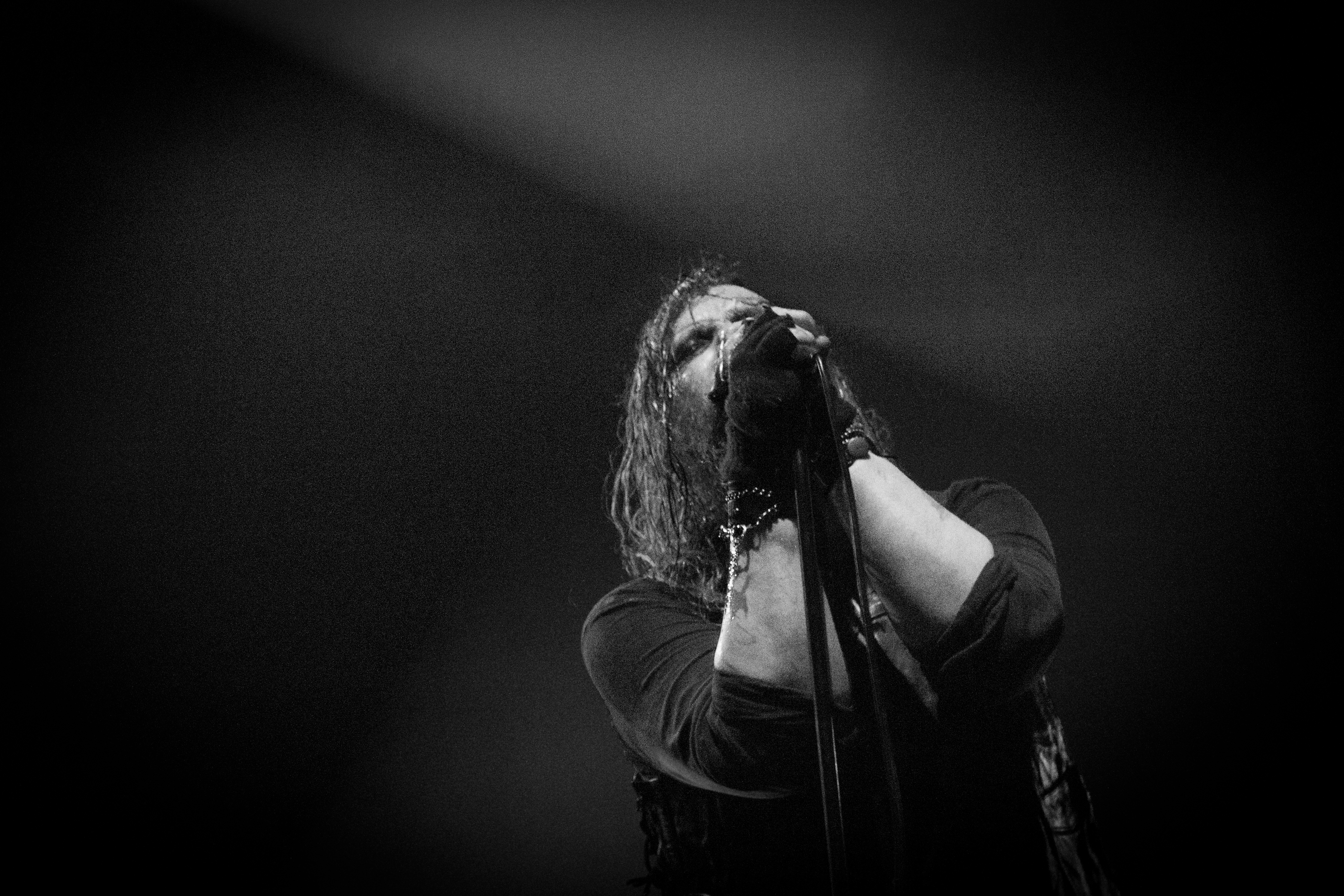
- Trepaneringsritualen performance at Tongeren MetalFest 2016

Background information
- Also known as: T × R × P
- Origin: Gothenburg, Sweden
- Genres: Industrial; dark ambient
- Years active: 2008-present
- Labels: Cold Spring; Tesco Organisation; Old Europa Cafe; Cyclic Law
- Members: Thomas Martin Ekelund; Peter Johan Nÿland
- Website: https://www.de-za-kh-a-da-sh-ba-a-ha-v.se/

Trepaneringsritualen is an industrial and dark ambient project created in 2008 by Swedish artist Thomas Martin Ekelund.

== Style and themes ==
Pitchfork defined the project as "heavy ritual ambient" with "an almost psychedelic quality" Orlando Weekly described it as "an immersive experience with few equals in the world of experimental music, a pagan assault on all the senses"

The name Trepaneringsritualen is a reference to the surgical intervention in which a hole is drilled or scraped into the human skull known as trepanning.

Ekelund has referred to English punk rock band Crass as his most important influence for teaching him "the importance of irreverence of form, and that music isn’t confined to the guitar-bass-drums paradigm".

== Members ==
- Thomas Martin Ekelund (2008–present)
- Peter Johan Nijland (2017–present)

== Discography ==
=== Studio albums ===
- Ritualer, blot och botgöring (2008)
- Veil the World (2011)
- Deathward, to The Womb (2012)
- Deathstench / Trepaneringsritualen – Deathstench / Trepaneringsritualen (2013)
- Perfection & Permanence (2014)
- Trepaneringsritualen & Sutekh Hexen – One Hundred Year Storm (2014)
- T × R × P // Body Cargo – T × R × P // Body Cargo (2016)
- Kainskult (2017)
- Rituals (2017)
- Mz.412 / Trepaneringsritualen – X Post Industriale / Rituals 2015 e.v. (2017)
- Oberhausen Ritual – Live at Maschinenfest 2016 E.V.(2017)
- ᛉᛦ – Algir; eller Algir i Merkstave (2019)
- Kainskult Remixed (2021)
- The Totality Of Death (A) (2024)
- The Totality Of Death (Ω) (2024)

=== Other aliases ===
Thomas Ekelund has also released a lot of music as Dead Letters Spell Out Dead Words, including several different releases called No Words, as well as records under the name Teeth.

== See also ==
- List of dark ambient artists
- List of ambient music artists
