= The Year of Our War =

2004 novel by Steph Swainston

- First edition
- Author: Steph Swainston
- Cover artist: Les Edwards
- Language: English
- Series: The Castle books
- Genre: Fantasy novel
- Publisher: Gollancz
- Publication date: April 2004
- Publication place: United Kingdom
- Media type: Print (Hardcover)
- Pages: 304 pp
- ISBN: 0-575-07005-6
- OCLC: 59270718
- Followed by: No Present Like Time

The fantasy novel The Year of Our War (2004) is the first book by British author Steph Swainston. It is often given as an example of the New Weird literary genre.

== Plot introduction ==
The novel is set in the Fourlands, a country in danger of being overrun by large hostile Insects, and follows the exploits of Jant, also called "the Messenger" or "Comet". As a half-breed of two humanoid species Jant is the only person who can fly, which makes him an indispensable part of the Emperor's Circle of about 50 immortals, an elite group of (mostly) warriors who do not age (but, despite the name, are capable of being killed).

So far, four sequels has been published: No Present Like Time (2005), The Modern World (2007), Above the Snowline (2010) and Fair Rebel (2016).

== Plot summary ==
With the support of the Castle immortals, the Awian king Dunlin Rachiswater leads an assault into the Insect-held Paperlands. However, Dunlin's attack fails and he is killed, leaving his unstable brother Staniel as king. Before Dunlin dies, Jant gives him the drug scolopendium, which allows him to live on in an alternate world known as the Shift. Jant regularly uses the drug to access the Shift and is addicted to it, a fact he tries to hide from the Emperor and other immortals.

Jant and the Archer, Lightning, return to the Castle, leaving the Strongman Tornado and his girlfriend Vireo guarding the front at Lowespass Fortress.

While escorting his brother's body for burial, Staniel's force is attacked by Insects and many of his men are killed. Paranoid, he begins drafting troops from across Awia for his own guard, leaving the country unprotected. In response, several other manors withdraw their troops for defence, leaving the front undermanned. Insects begin to roam unchecked in great numbers, causing towns to be abandoned.

At the Castle, Governor Swallow Awndyn petitions the Emperor to be made immortal on the strength of her musical talents, but he refuses her, unconvinced that music can be used to protect the Fourlands from Insects. Devastated, she leads her troops to the front to prove herself. Though she is desperate to be accepted into the Circle, she consistently refuses Lightning's proposals of marriage, wanting to gain immortality on her own merit.

At the front, Swallow's force observes the Insects building a strange bridge into the sky. Soon after they are attacked and routed with severe losses. They retreat to Rachiswater Palace, but find that Staniel has closed the gates against them. In the ensuing massacre, Swallow is gravely wounded and she, Lightning and Jant barely escape.

Jant receives word from Vireo and Tornado that they are running out of supplies, as the Insects begin to build a wall around Lowespass Fortress. Insects are appearing across Awia and elsewhere, threatening to overrun the Fourlands completely.

Amidst this crisis, a feud develops between the immortal Sailor Shearwater Mist and his wife Ata when she devises a plan to rescue Tornado and Vireo's forces by sailing up river. She issues a challenge for his position of a Sailor. In the ensuing conflict, Mist is killed and the Emperor offers Ata his position in the Circle if she is successful in relieving Lowespass.

While under the influence of scolopendium, Jant learns that Dunlin has united the people of the Shift and driven the Insects out of many of their territories, causing their migration in huge numbers to the Fourlands through the sky bridge. Dunlin agrees to halt his attacks for four weeks, in order to give the Castle a chance to save Awia.

Rescuing Lightning and Swallow from being overrun by Insects, Jant and Ata set sail for Lowespass, while the other immortals attempt to rally the people of the Fourlands to hold the Insects at bay. Ata's forces engage the Insects in a desperate battle, holding them off long enough to break out Tornado and destroy the bridge, but Vireo is killed.

As the troops celebrate the rescue of the Fourlands, Lightning assures Jant that, in the life of an immortal, their trials will in time make the best stories.

== Awards and nominations ==
The book won the 2005 Crawford Award and the author was nominated for the John W. Campbell Award for Best New Writer.

== Reviews and sources ==
- Infinity Plus review
- SF World review
- Page at Orion Books
- Interview with Steph Swainston about The Year of Our War
