= Reliquiae (album) =

Studio album by Atrium Carceri
- Released: March 18, 2012
- Recorded: Sweden
- Genre: Dark ambient, Experimental
- Label: Cold Meat Industry
- Producer: Simon Heath

Atrium Carceri chronology
Phrenitis (2009)	Reliquiae (2012)	Void (2012)

Reliquiae is the seventh album by Swedish Dark ambient project Atrium Carceri. It was released on March 18, 2012, through Cold Meat Industry

== Track listing ==
No.	Title	Length
1.	"Floating Above The City"	2:28
2.	"Unveiled"	3:44
3.	"Approaching The Coven"	4:01
4.	"Knowledge Of The Few"	5:20
5.	"Acolyte"	3:41
6.	"Injection"	4:38
7.	"Third From The Centre"	2:49
8.	"Portal Key"	1:58
9.	"Manufactured Minds"	4:23
10.	"Her Blessing"	4:57
11.	"Rusty Red Memory"	3:26
12.	"The Long Walk"	4:14
13.	"Through The Tunnels"	3:42
14.	"A Factory Of Souls"	2:33
15.	"Recovering Fragments"	3:40
16.	"Synchronization"	3:18
17.	"Disassembling The Creator"	3:23
18.	"Truth Revealed"	3:33
19.	"Goddess"	3:55

== Personnel ==
- Simon Heath
