= PTA =

PTA may refer to:

== Organizations ==
- Andalusia Technology Park (Spanish: Parque Tecnológico de Andalucía), a science park in Málaga, Spain
- Pakistan Telecommunication Authority, an agency in Pakistan responsible for communication networks.
- Parent–teacher association, an organization of parents, teachers, and staff at a school
- Passenger transport authority, a United Kingdom local government authority
- Public Transport Authority (Denmark)
- Public Transport Authority (Western Australia)

== Science and medicine ==
- 1,3,5-Triaza-7-phosphaadamantane, organic compound
- Percutaneous transluminal angioplasty, surgical procedure
- Peritonsillar abscess
- Persistent truncus arteriosus, congenital heart disease
- Pharmacy technical assistant
- Phosphate acetyltransferase, enzyme
- Phosphotungstic acid, acid catalyst and stain
- Physical therapist assistant
- Plasma thromboplastin antecedent, blood enzyme
- Plasma transferred arc, coating technology
- Post-traumatic amnesia, state of confusion following a traumatic brain injury
- Pulsar timing array, technique to detect gravitational waves
- Pure tone audiometry, hearing test
- Purified terephthalic acid, organic compound used to make polyester

== Other uses ==
- Paul Thomas Anderson, American filmmaker
- a possible mnemonic symbol for Peseta, the former Spanish currency
- Postal code for Pietà, Malta
- Planes, Trains and Automobiles, a 1987 American film by John Hughes
- Pohakuloa Training Area, a military training facility
- Point of total assumption, a contract term
- Port Talbot Parkway railway station in Wales (station code)
- Preferential trading area, a type of trading bloc
- Pretoria, the administrative and de facto capital of South Africa
- Prevention of Terrorism Act, the name of several countries' Acts of Parliament
- Program test authority, after a construction permit but before a broadcast license

== See also ==
- Ptah (disambiguation)
