= 0010x0010 =

Dutch-born audiovisual artist

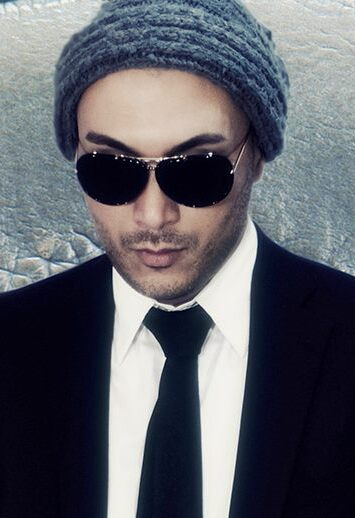
- Born: Raymond Tijssen; Helmond, Netherlands
- Other name: T3TSUO 303, GDPRDX,
- Occupations: Audio/visual artist; music producer; director; photographer; DJ
- Known for: Techno, Ambient, Mixed Media, Video Art, Computer Art, Sound Art, Installation Art
- Style: Surrealism, Avant Garde, Futurism
- Website: 0010x0010.com

Raymond Tijssen, known as 0010x0010, is a Dutch-born audiovisual artist currently living in Los Angeles.

== Early years ==
In his early years, being inspired by underground techno, he released a series of vinyl records under various pseudonyms (only one using his real name) and he performed live acid techno sets at underground parties such as Acid Rain at Amsterdam Graansilo. During the recording sessions for one of the tracks he produced for ex Soul II Soul and The Shamen singer Victoria Wilson James's album on Sony Music, it was suggested that he audition for the "De Bende van Venlo", a theatre piece based on a true crime story. He was cast in one of the lead roles and performed over thirty European shows.

== Los Angeles ==
After the theatre experience, Universal / Island Records won the label-bidding and signed him as an artist and producer. He released one single and one video before he left the label due to creative differences and moved from London to Los Angeles to work on his art, film, photography and editing career.

In late 2015, he finished working as the visual supervisor of a documentary about Russian director Andrei Tarkovsky based on his diaries Time within Time, starring Tonino Guerra.

In 2016, he released two EPs (as 0010x0010 and T3TSUO 303) on his Generation Acid label which both landed in the Beatport Techno Top 100 charts. The May 2017 released acid techno album |||Ø||| made it to the techno and house top 10 charts on both Beatport and Juno Records.

In June 2018, he opened the Hong Kong art gallery Nido Asia with the pop up exhibition "Collixion 中" featuring Audio Visual installations and an interactive live show in collaboration with local Hong Kong artist Quistography.

Meanwhile, his techno music releases "Alien Love Syndrome" and "Stranded on Neptune" were in heavy club and festival rotation after being played by Dax J and DJ Rush for their Boiler Room (music project) TV sets and his dark trip hop song "She'll never be me" featuring vocalist Shexist was used in a prominent scene in the 2016 film Compulsion. The song also appeared on the "We are not alone" playlist curated by Ellen Allien. During his traveling through Asia and Europe, he started to record his album "MØDVLXXR" using strictly modular synthesizers. He finished the album at his studio in Los Angeles and it was released in July 2019 to support his new exhibition "MØDVLXXR" that premiered the same month at Museum of Contemporary Art in Bangkok and was opened by Boonchai Bencharongkul. Both album and exhibition received positive reviews and support from radio and magazines. After exhibiting his A.I. driven "Intelligent Artifacts" at W1 Curates, in the basement and on the shop-front of the Flannels store, Oxford Street, London, the entire exhibition collection was sold via Xumiiro Gallery for a seven figure price to the largest shareholder of Asia Aviation. In October 2023, Samsung announced a collaboration with 0010x0010 to create visual art utilizing their flagship screen "the Wall". On 17 October 2023, the Samsung x 0010x0010 "Algorithmic Organisms" world tour curated by Xumiiro Gallery began at The Museum of Contemporary Art (MOCA) Bangkok.
