= The Modern World (novel) =

2007 book by Steph Swainston

- Author: Steph Swainston
- Language: English
- Series: The Castle books
- Genre: Fantasy novel
- Publisher: Gollancz
- Publication date: April 2007
- Publication place: United Kingdom
- Media type: Print (Hardback & Paperback)
- Pages: 336 pp
- ISBN: 978-0-575-07007-3
- OCLC: 72148537
- Preceded by: No Present Like Time

The Modern World (published as Dangerous Offspring in the US) is a 2007 fantasy/science fiction novel by the British author Steph Swainston and is a sequel to The Year of Our War (2004) and No Present Like Time (2005).

== Plot introduction ==
The novel is set in the Fourlands, a country in danger of being overrun by large hostile Insects, and follows the exploits of Jant, also called "the Messenger" or "Comet". As a half-breed of two humanoid species, Jant is the only person who can fly, making him indispensable to the Emperor's Circle of about 50 immortals. It is an elite group of (mostly) warriors who do not age but can still be killed despite their name.

== Plot summary ==
At Slake Cross near the border with the Insect-held Paperlands, the immortals are gathered to oversee the latest plan to retake lost territory. Frost, the immortal Architect, has constructed a gigantic dam which will allow them to flood and drain the surrounding area. The Insects, unable to swim, can be driven back and land reclaimed.

Jant learns that Cyan, the 19-year-old daughter of his friend Lightning, the archer, has gone missing in the city of Hacilith. Jant, familiar with the city's underworld from his youth, agrees to search for her.

In Hacilith, he locates Cyan but she refuses to return with him, having tired of her life as a secluded noblewoman. That night, Jant discovers Cyan unconscious in the throes of the drug scolopendium, and takes her to the immortal doctor, Rayne.

There he is approached by the Vermiform, a creature from the alternate world of the Shift, which Jant has previously accessed through the use of scolopendium. The Vermiform tells Jant that Cyan has entered the Shift and together they rescue her from the Gabbleratchet, a strange monster which constantly shifts between worlds in a bizarre hunt. On the run from the creature, the Vermiform shows them many worlds which have fallen to the Insects. When they escape back to the real world, Cyan reluctantly agrees to join her father at Slake Cross.

On his flight back to the dam, Jant is shocked to feel the Circle break three times, each indicating the death of an immortal. At the dam he finds a chaotic scene; the Insects, previously unable to fly, have taken to the air in a mating flight, and are laying their eggs in the lake, killing any who approach. Holed up in their defenses, the immortals theorise that the presence of standing water has triggered an instinct to breed.

Jant returns to the palace to inform the Emperor San of the threat. To the astonishment of all, the Emperor orders all the armies of the Fourlands to be called into action, and prepares to leave the palace to go to the front - an event said to mean that the end of the world is approaching.

At the front, the armies begin to gather, and the immortals realise that if the eggs are allowed to hatch the Insects' numbers will be unstoppable. They agree to try to fight their way to the winch tower, which will allow the lake to be drained. During the counsel session, in a bid to gain her father's attention, Cyan challenges Lightning for his position in the Circle. The Emperor agrees that the challenge may go ahead if they survive the crisis.

The armies advance towards the lake but soon find themselves cut off, and attacked by the newly-hatched larvae, which ravenously devour anything before them. Lightning orders a retreat, but Frost manages to break through to the dam itself. There she and her crew manage to collapse the dam, killing themselves in the process but washing away the Insects and their eggs.

With the crisis passed, Lightning holds a ceremony at his estate for Cyan's challenge. Though the spectators expect him to win easily, he deliberately misses his shot, giving up his place in the Circle and becoming mortal again.

As the immortals return to relative normality, Jant reflects on whether he has, despite himself, become part of the establishment. Traumatised by recent events and frightened of losing his closest friend, he reveals that he has begun to use the drug scolopendium once again.

== Sources and reviews ==
- Swainston on "the Modern World"
