= Not Your Average Hippy =

Pseudonym used by recording artist Scott Turner,

Not Your Average Hippy is the pseudonym used by Scott Turner, an American ambient recording artist, for his solo ambient releases. Not Your Average Hippy is a deep exploration into tonality, lush soundscapes, and dark environmental sonic canvas.

The music of Not Your Average Hippy can be found on both Blue Water Records and Earth Mantra in addition to other labels and compilations. His music has been aired on all manner of online and FM radio stations, and used in an episode of The Sopranos in Season 6.

== Discography ==
=== Albums ===
- The NYAH EP – Blue Water Records (July, 2004)
- Stones - Blue Water Records (November, 2004)
- Man's Best Friend - Blue Water Records (January, 2006)
- Warm Ground Dark Sky – Earth Mantra (2008)

=== Compilations ===
- The Space Collaboration, V1.0 - Ambient Collective (2005)
- Drone Download Project, Year 2 – (2005)
- Organbient, Longform Ambient Compilation Vol. 1 - Blue Water Records (2006)
- Places of Importance - Ambient Collective (2006)
- Drone Download Project, Year 3 – (2006)
- Ambient Collective, Best of Volume One - Ambient Collective (2007)
- Copal River - Scott Turner (Not Your Average Hippy) and Darrell Burgan (of Palancar) (July 16, 2008)

=== Other ===
- Sopranos in Season 6 – HBO (2007)
