= Rising Shadows =

Swedish neoclassical dark wave band

- Origin: Stockholm, Sweden
- Genres: Neoclassical dark wave, world music, folk music, art rock
- Years active: 1996-present
- Label: Twilight Records
- Members: Fredrik Klingwall; Linda-li Dahlin
- Past members: Guillaume Le Huche

Rising Shadows is a neoclassical dark wave band formed in Stockholm, Sweden by composer Fredrik Klingwall in 1996.

== Biography ==
Rising Shadows was originally started by Fredrik Klingwall as a one-man project under the name 'Shadow of the Concealed'. The project released one demo and then changed the name into Rising Shadows in 1997. From 1999 the project was more or less on hold until vocalist Linda-li joined in 2004.

In 2006 their debut album Falling Deep Within was released by Argentinian label Twilight Records. The album featured songs rich with medieval and Nordic folk influences. They also appeared on two compilation issued by fantasy label Waerloga Records.

For the recordings of the second album Found In The Cold they were joined by former Katatonia bassist Guillaume Le Huche. Found In The Cold was released by Twilight Records in late 2008. Guillaume subsequently left the band during the recordings of the third album Finis Gloriae Mundi.

== Members ==
=== Current ===
- Linda-li Dahlin - vocals (2004-)
- Fredrik Klingwall - keyboard (1996-)

=== Former members ===
- Guillaume Le Huche - bass (2008–2010)

=== Session ===
- Mattias Olsson - Percussion on Finis Gloriae Mundi (2010)
- KG Westman - Sitar on Finis Gloriae Mundi (2010)
- Daniel Cannerfelt - Electric guitar on Finis Gloriae Mundi (2010)
- Stefan Granberg - Bouzouki on Finis Gloriae Mundi (2010)

== Discography ==
=== Albums ===
- Falling Deep Within (2006)
- Found in the Cold (2008)
- Finis Gloriae Mundi (2010)

=== Contributions ===
- A Tribute To Uglakh (Waerloga, "Vacui") (2005)
- Radio Rivendell (Waerloga, "Dead Cold") (2006)
- In The Dark Room Vol.1 (Darkroom Magazine, "Falling Deep Within (different mix)") (2008)
