= Steph Swainston =

British writer (born 1974)

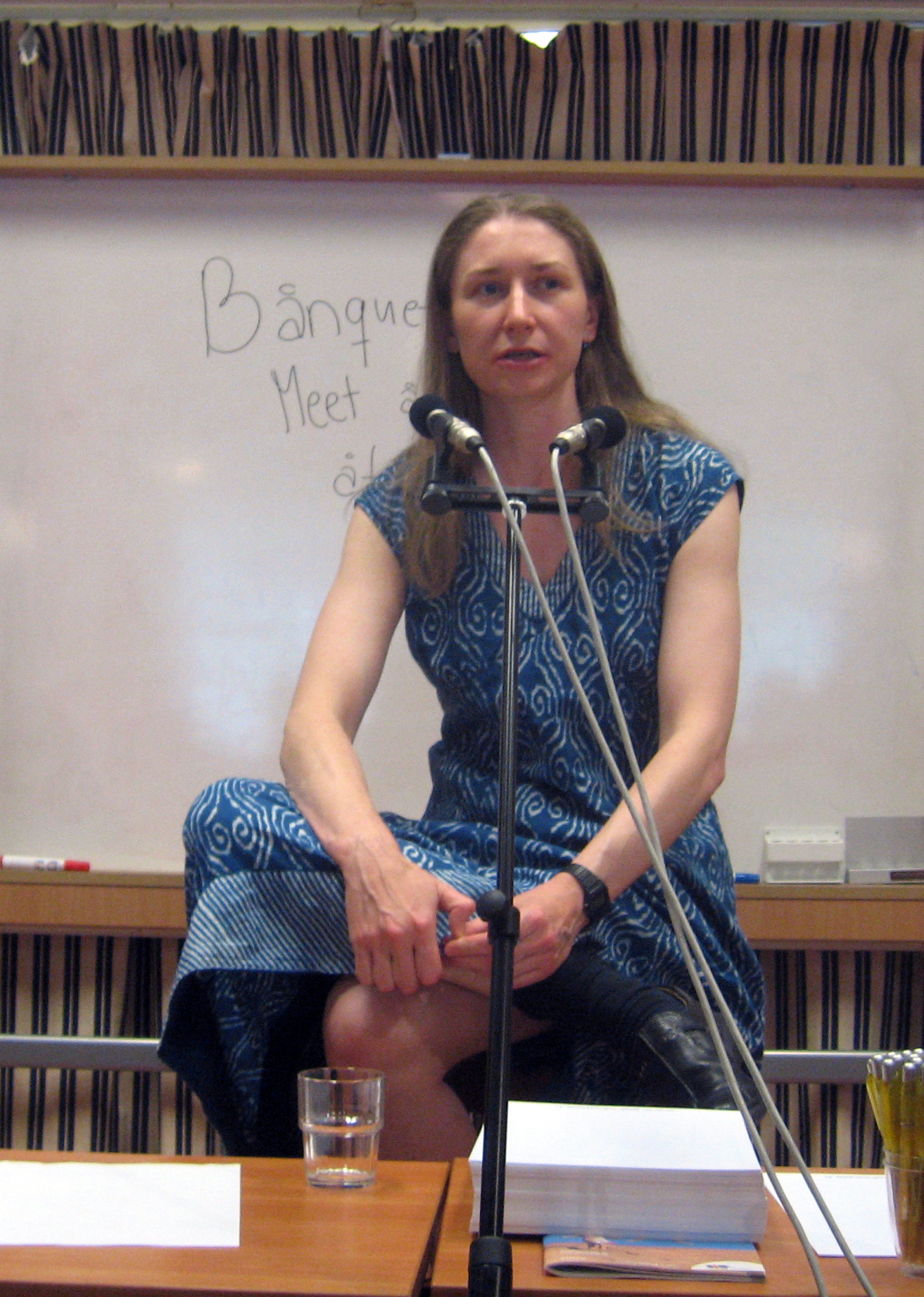
- Swainston at Åcon in 2009
- Born: Stephanie Jane Swainston; 1974 (age 51–52) Bradford, Yorkshire, England
- Occupation: Novelist
- Genre: Literary fantasy New Weird

Website
- stephswainston.co.uk

Stephanie Jane Swainston (born 1974) is a British literary fantasy/science fiction author, known for the Castle series. Her debut novel, The Year of Our War (2004), won the 2005 Crawford Award and a nomination for the John W. Campbell Award for Best New Writer.

== Biography ==
Swainston was born in Bradford, West Yorkshire, in 1974. She attended St Joseph's Catholic College, Bradford, followed by Girton College, Cambridge, and the University of Wales. Outside writing, Swainston has had a broad range of occupations, which include bookseller, archaeologist, lock keeper, information scientist, and pyrotechnician.

Swainston's novels to date take place in the Fourlands, which the author has described as a secret childhood paracosm, further influenced by aspects of her later adult life, including the competitive academic world. The novels centre on the life of the Circle, an elite group of immortals created and sustained by the Emperor, a near god-like figure engaged in a prolonged conflict with insect-like creatures, apparently from another world. Told in the first person, the novels follow the life of Jant, a winged humanoid with a distinctly flawed personality. The Castle series is also marked by the existence of multiple worlds, including the fantastic, baroque "Shift".

The novels have been labeled by others as New Weird fantasy. Swainston has argued against labeling writers, including herself, within genres, on the basis that good fantasy and mainstream literature form a continuum. She has been critical of the conservative nature of much commercial fantasy writing. Her writing, unlike most works classified as traditional fantasy, depicts drug use and graphic sex scenes, alongside the hyper-realistic depiction of warfare. Swainston describes her work as appealing to the ongoing deep structures of universal storytelling, as literature written as much in response to the author's own needs than as a response to specific market requirements.

Swainston took a break from writing in 2011 to become a chemistry teacher, but subsequently returned to writing. Her fifth novel, Fair Rebel, was published in 2016.

== Bibliography ==
=== Novels ===
- The Year of Our War (Gollancz SF, 2004) ISBN 978-0-575-07642-6
- No Present Like Time (Gollancz SF, 2005, hardcover) ISBN 978-0-575-07006-6
- The Modern World (Gollancz SF, 2007, hardback) ISBN 0-575-07007-2
- Above the Snowline (Gollancz SF, 2010, hardcover) ISBN 978-0-575-08158-1
- Fair Rebel (Gollancz SF, 2016, paperback) ISBN 978-0575081697

==== Omnibus editions ====
- The Castle Omnibus (collects "The Year of Our War", "No Present Like Time" and "The Modern World") (Gollancz SF, 2009, paperback) ISBN 978-0-575-09125-2

=== Collection ===
- Wrought Gothic and Other Scenes (Air and Nothingness Press, 2016, paperback) ISBN 978-0-9679429-7-1
- Turning Point (collection) (Air and Nothingness Press, 2018, paperback) ISBN 978-0-9991953-1-4
- Velocity's Aftermath (collecting "Wrought Gothic", "Aftermath" and "Turning Point") (Air and Nothingness Press, 2023, paperback) ISBN 979-8-986-81957-0

=== Short fiction ===
- "The Wheel of Fortune" (included in The Best British Fantasy 2013, Salt Publishing, 2013, paperback) ISBN 978-1907773358
- Aftermath (an excerpt from a book-length sequel to Fair Rebel entitled The Savant and the Snake, and other material) (Air and Nothingness Press, 2016, paperback) ISBN 978-0-9679429-8-8
- "Velocity" (included in The Best of British Fantasy 2018, NewCon Press, 2019) ISBN 978-1912950188
