= D2s1 =

Russian music producer and composer

d2s1 Евгений Георгиевич Макаров
- Also known as: D2s1; Teddyambient; uglysoul; bad person
- Born: Evgenii Georgievich Makarov
- Origin: Russia
- Genres: Ambient; dark ambient; electronic; experimental; Dreamcore; Alternative rock and indie rock
- Occupations: Record producer; composer
- Years active: 2023–present
- Labels: Independent; The System; Kurate Music

Evgenii Georgievich Makarov (Евгений Георгиевич Макаров), known professionally as d2s1, is a Russian electronic music producer and composer. Active since the early 2020s, he gained substantial online traction with minimalist, ambient tracks such as "5469" "forgive me", "fish", and "unwanted".

Makarov's work is characterized by eerie, melancholic soundscapes combining elements of dark ambient, electronic, and experimental sound design. Within online music subcultures, his work is frequently associated with internet microgenres such as "discomfortcore" and "traumacore", characterized by themes of isolation and psychological unease. This auditory atmosphere is mirrored across his digital releases by a distinct minimalist visual identity, predominantly featuring cover art depicting desolate, snow-covered roads and barren landscapes photographed during the blue hour, evoking concepts of liminal spaces.

== Career ==
d2s1 began producing music independently, focusing on electronic and eerie soundscapes. His early releases were self-produced and distributed on digital platforms. Over time, he developed a distinctive style characterized by minimal rhythms and unsettling textures.

== Songs ==
Song	Release date
Carotid Artery	July 21, 2023
Euphoria	August 18, 2023
Reincarnation	September 11, 2023
I’m my own designer	December 1, 2023
my name is Miles	February 2, 2024
Anxiety depression	March 1, 2024
It gets dark in winter	March 1, 2024
Fish	May 7, 2024
without you	May 20, 2024
Fish (remixes)	May 30, 2024
ash	June 25, 2024
i hate^my friends	August 16, 2024
Forgive me	August 19, 2024
Blades	October 4, 2024
Forgive me (remixes)	October 14, 2024
syamozero	November 22, 2024
Unwanted	December 20, 2024
5469	January 24, 2025
5469 (remixes)	January 29, 2025
Meowsic	March 8, 2025
Meowsic *kness	March 14, 2025
Pointless	March 21, 2025
Please help me	March 28, 2025
You	June 6, 2025
Iwannadie	June 20, 2025
=(	July 11, 2025
It never mattered	July 25, 2025
---	August 11, 2025
Mistake	August 29, 2025
Why	October 17, 2025
Soon	October 31, 2025
wasting	November 14, 2025
1	January 20, 2026
me	February 22, 2026
not me	March 2, 2026
?	March 27, 2026
i hate d2s1	March 27, 2026
silly song	April 3, 2026
you (remixes)	April 6, 2026
sad song	April 17, 2026
who am i	April 24, 2026
snow	May 1, 2026
hi	May 15, 2026
Cannibal	July 5, 2026
#5469	August 28, 2026
