= Helen Trevillion =

English independent musician

Helen Trevillion is an English independent musician. After releasing her songs for free for several years (winning two Fantasy Awards from Radio Rivendell for her work), she released her first album in 2007. Inside Myself / Once Upon A Time was produced and recorded by Trevillion herself. It was sold via online music stores such as iTunes and CD Baby. Physical copies were also available.

In 2008, she composed the soundtrack to the independent adventure game The Strange and Somewhat Sinister Tale of the House at Desert Bridge; the soundtrack was received positively.
