= Kammarheit =

Swedish dark ambient project

- Origin: Sweden
- Genres: Dark Ambient
- Years active: 2000 - present
- Labels: Cyclic Law, Cryo Chamber
- Members: Pär Boström
- Website: http://www.kammarheit.com

Kammarheit is a Swedish dark ambient project. The only member of this project is Pär Boström, who is a resident of Umeå, Sweden. It currently runs on the label Cyclic Law.

== Discography ==
=== Official Albums ===
- Asleep and Well Hidden (2003)
- The Starwheel (2005)
- The Nest (2015)
- Thronal (2020)

=== Unofficial Albums ===
- Shockwork (2000)
- Among The Ruins (2001)
- At The Heart Of Destruction (2001)
- Somewhere Concealed (2002)
- The Downfall And The Arising (2002)
- The Northern Hymn (2002)

=== Compilations ===
- Nord Ambient Alliance (2002)
- LIVE AKTION – Klabböle Kraftverk (2002–2004)
- Unearthed (2015) all six of the 'unofficial' albums above)
- Triune (161st Cycle) (2020)

=== Other Releases ===
- Of Dawn And Of Ice, Split EP with Phelios (2009)

== Cities Last Broadcast ==
Cities Last Broadcast is the side and lone project of Pär Boström. Its debut album, The Cancelled Earth was released through Cyclic Law, with every later album released under Cryo Chamber. His typical style is experimental and consists of field recordings, old reel-to-reel tape recorders, tape loops, piano and acoustic, and de-tuned instruments played through a pile of effect pedals, all combined in a modern studio with modern mixing techniques. Miles To Midnight is described as a "Dark Jazz Ambient album" with live jazz drums, tape loops, piano and bass.

=== Official Albums ===
- The Cancelled Earth (2009)
- The Humming Tapes (2016)
- The Umbra Report (2021)

=== Collaborations with other artists ===
- Black Corner Den (with Atrium Carceri) (2017)
- Miles To Midnight (with Atrium Carceri and God Body Disconnect) (2018)
- Black Stage of Night (with Atrium Carceri) (2019)
- Phantasmora (with Fractalyst) (2024)

=== Compilation Singles ===
- Cabinet (Eudoxus by Various Artists) (2016)
- Static (Terra Relicta Presents: Vol. I Dark Ambient by Various Artists) (2016)
- Mirrorlike (Where Words Fail, Music Speaks - A Compilation For Ania Mehring by Various Artists) (2016)
- Voiced (Vol.1 Dark Ambient by This Is Darkness) (2017)
- Unbidden (Vol.2 Nothingness by This Is Darkness) (2019)
- Each Night (Tomb Of Wights by Cyro Chamber) (2021)
