= No Present Like Time =

2005 novel by Steph Swainston

- First edition
- Author: Steph Swainston
- Cover artist: Emma Wallace
- Language: English
- Series: The Castle books
- Genre: Fantasy novel
- Publisher: Gollancz
- Publication date: April 2005
- Publication place: United Kingdom
- Pages: 317 pp
- ISBN: 0-575-07006-4
- OCLC: 156710504
- Preceded by: The Year of Our War
- Followed by: The Modern World

The fantasy/science fiction novel No Present Like Time (2005) by Steph Swainston is the sequel to the critically acclaimed The Year of Our War (2004).

== Plot introduction ==
The novel is set in the Fourlands, a country in danger of being overrun by large hostile Insects, and follows the exploits of Jant, also called "the Messenger" or "Comet". As a half-breed of two humanoid species Jant is the only person who can fly, which makes him an indispensable part of the Emperor's Circle of about 50 immortals, an elite group of (mostly) warriors who do not age (but, despite the name, are capable of being killed).

== Plot summary ==
A young soldier, Wrenn, challenges the immortal Swordsman Gio Serein and defeats him to earn his place in the Circle. Though the Emperor San acknowledges Wrenn's victory, Gio is bitter at again becoming mortal, and has to be ejected from the Castle.

Along with Lightning the Archer and Jant the Messenger, Wrenn is chosen to accompany the Sailor Mist on her voyage to the newly discovered island of Tris, three months' journey from the Fourlands. San hopes that Tris will join the Empire, bringing with it new culture and innovation.

During the journey, Jant discovers a live Insect in the hold, which Mist plans to show to the people of Tris. With the stress of the voyage and worries of his wife's infidelity, Jant begins to use the drug scolopendium again, which allows him access to the bizarre alternate world known as the Shift. There he learns of many strange creatures, including the sea kraits - colossal sea snakes, whose environment is threatened by Insect expansion.

Arriving at Tris, the immortals find an idyllic democracy with a rich culture and history. As the ruling council debates their offer, they trade with the townspeople, finding that gold is plentiful. During the night, the Insect breaks free. Wrenn, armed only with a rapier, is unable to stop it; the Insect kills several Trisians and escapes into the sewers. Horrified, the council rejects membership of the Empire and the immortals sail back to the Fourlands in disgrace.

When they arrive home they find the land in turmoil. The rejected Gio has raised an army which he leads in rebellion against the Castle. With their crew dispersed, the four immortals travel across land to report to the Emperor. They encounter Gio in a forest, but he escapes, badly wounding Lightning in the process.

Gio's forces attack the Castle but are driven off by the Strongman Tornado and the Horse Master Hayl. Jant is sent the spy on Gio and learns that he plans to take his remaining forces to Tris.

Jant, Mist, Wrenn and the wounded Lightning set sail after him. Arriving at Tris they find Gio entrenched with a strong force. Jant attempts to poison him but fails, causing Gio's forces to attack. During the battle, Mist is killed when Gio's men overrun her position. He seeks out Wrenn and in the ensuing duel he is also killed, though Wrenn is severely wounded. Though their leader is dead, Gio's forces continue to fight. Jant, seeing that the situation is desperate, uses scolopendium to enter the Shift. There, he convinces the sea kraits to reside to the seas around the Fourlands; their arrival puts an end to the fighting and Tris is saved.

When the survivors return, the Emperor chides Jant for his unilateral action, but allows him to keep the riches he has gained from the voyage. Reconciling with his wife, Jant vows to give up scolopendium once again.

== Sources and reviews ==
- Review at infinity plus
- SF Crowsnest review
- Page at Orion Books
- Interview with Steph Swainston about the book
