= Austere (EDM group) =

US musical group

- Origin: Portland, Oregon, United States
- Genres: Ambient, Drone, minimalism
- Years active: 1998 – present
- Labels: Sound-O-Mat Recordings (2001–present); Hypnos (2006–2011); Blue Water Records (2007–2010); Dark Duck Records; Drone Download Project (2001–2008) relaxedMACHINERY (2010–2012)
- Members: anonymous
- Past members: anonymous

Austere is an anonymous electronic music group known for producing work in a range of styles including classical minimalism, psybient, ambient, dark ambient, drone, glitch-ambient, and downtempo drum and bass. The group began collaborating in 1997, with their first release issued on January 1, 1998. Although they maintain anonymity, they are loosely based in Portland, Oregon, through an affiliation with Sound-O-Mat Recordings.

The two members of Austere have lived in several locations, including New York City, North Chatham in the United Kingdom, Portland, Seattle, Brighton, and San Francisco.

Their recordings in the classical minimalism genre, such as "Convergence", "Eco", "Pulse", and "Vox", draw influence from Steve Reich’s process music, particularly as described in his 1968 essay "Music as a Gradual Process".

Austere has collaborated with artists including Abstract Audio Systems from New York City, In The Now from Brighton, and Stephen Philips of Dark Duck Records.

The group has contributed music to various video and film projects. They provided the soundtrack for "The Thin Horizon", an independent film by Michael Peters of Artifexwerks in Forest Grove, Oregon. A track from the Dark Duck Records Drone Download Project was used in the independent film "Claude's Room". Their music has also been featured in several music videos, including "Abandon" and "Tiny Danser".

Members of Austere have also pursued solo projects under the names The Mystifying Oracle and Freq. Magnet. Freq. Magnet has released three full-length CDs, a DVD, and a track on a Hypnos compilation album.

== Discography ==
Austere discography
- Studio albums: 13
- Extended plays: 4
- Soundtrack albums: 2
- Live albums: 1
- Singles: 10
- Video albums: 2
- Collection: 1

The discography of Austere includes thirteen studio albums, four EPs, and ten compilation appearances. Several of these compilation contributions have been released through Hypnos. The group has also released a six-hour compilation box set that includes previously released material as well as three unreleased tracks.

== Albums ==
Released	Title	Other information	Label
18 January 1998	Convergence (CD)	Originally a CDR released by the band. Reissued on CD by Sound-O-Mat Recordings in 2005.	Sound-O-Mat Recordings (SOM#01)
October 1999	Monodia (CDR)	Limited edition of 50 and 15 promo copies (65 total), long out-of-print.	Sound-O-Mat Recordings (SOM#02)
February 2000	fade (CDR)		Sound-O-Mat Recordings (SOM#03)
October 2000; reissued 2006	Curio (CDR)	First limited edition of 50 with gold foil. Reissued by Sound-O-Mat Recordings in 2006.	Sound-O-Mat Recordings (SOM#05)
March 2003	Remission (CDR)	"Unreleased" in January 2004, replaced by Remittance CD.	Sound-O-Mat Recordings (SOM#06)
December 2004	Remittance (CDR)	A "re-release" of Remission with two changed tracks and a remastering job. Free copies were offered to those who bought Remission via a "replacement kit".	Sound-O-Mat Recordings (SOM#08)
2005	Eco (CD)	Artwork by Cat Rayburn. First CD design done by someone other than one of the band members.	Sound-O-Mat Recordings (SOM#09)
2005	faded (CDR)	A "demix" collaboration between Austere and Stephen Philips of Dark Duck Records, using their original CD release fade.	Sound-O-Mat Recordings (SOM#10); co-released by Dark Duck Records.
2007	Pulse (CDR)	The third of their Steve Reich inspired process music releases.	Hypnos Secret Sounds (hss10).
August 2007	rirrom ("mirror") (CDR)	All information on CD package is backwards, printed on "mirror-like" material, and can be read by holding up to a mirror.	Blue Water Records ().
10 February 2008	Solyaris (CD)	The first on Hypnos main label.	Hypnos (hyp2753).
18 January 2009	The Sound of Silence I: An "Unnatural History" of Rare and Unreleased Tracks (box set with MP3 player)	Box set comes with all tracks in 320Kbs CBR MP3 format on a SanDisk flash card in an MP3 player. Released exactly ten years after band's first release.	Sound-O-Mat Recordings (SOM#11).
13 January 2012	Euterpe (CD)	The first on relaxedMACHINERY art /music / community label.	relaxedMACHINERY (rM_0021).

== EPs ==
Year	Title	Other information	Label
August 2000	distance (CDR)	A collaboration with In The Now	Sound-O-Mat Recordings (SOM#04)
2004	evergone (CDR)	A collaboration with Abstract Audio Systems from New York City, New York.	Sound-O-Mat Recordings (SOM#07)

== Compilations ==
Year	Title	Other information	Label
2001	Diapason	Drone Download Project Year 1 (data 2xCD)	Dark Duck Records (DDP #1)
2001	Whainer	CD-only bonus track on the Drone Download Project Year 1 (data 2xCD)	Dark Duck Records (DDP #1)
2003	Tea-Totaled	Drone Download Project Year 2 (data CD)	Dark Duck Records (DDP #2)
2004	The Hills Are Alive	Track on Full Cold Moon: A Tribute to Jhonn Balance (MP3)	Dark Winter
2005	Big Bang into Particle Acceleration	Track on Space Collaboration (MP3)	The Ambient Collective
2005	Wend	Drone Download Project Year 3 (data CD)	Dark Duck Records (DDP #3)
2006	The Cuce	Track on Orgambient: Long Form Ambient Vol. 1	Blue Water Records
2007	Alchemy (Gold Into Lead demix)	Track on Lena - Alchemy of Fingers and Dark CDS	Hypnos
2007	Puissant	Drone Download Project Year 4 (data CD)	Dark Duck Records (DDP #4)
2008	Fasciculate	Drone Download Project Year 5 (data CD)	Dark Duck Records
2008	Crystil	Track on Messages from a Subatomic World CD	Hypnos

== Soundtracks ==
Film	Studio	Year	Producer
Fast 'n' Bulbous - A Tribute To Captain Beefheart (Song "Electricity")	unknown	1988	none
The Thin Horizon	Artifexwerks	2006	Artifexwerks
Claude's Room	unknown	2008	unknown

== DVDs ==
=== short form ===
Year	Title	Director	Album
2006	faded DVD	Austere	faded

=== Releases ===
1. Convergence – self-released, 1998; reissued by The Sound-O-Mat, 2004
2. Monodia – self-released limited edition of 100, 1999
3. fade – self-released, 2000
4. Curio – first limited edition of 50 with gold foil, 2000; second unlimited edition, 2006
5. distance (with In The Now), 2002
6. Remission – Sound-O-Mat Recordings, 2003; "unreleased" in 2004
7. evergone (with Abstract Audio Systems), 2004
8. Remittance – Sound-O-Mat Recordings, 2004
9. Eco – Sound-O-Mat Recordings, 2005
10. faded (with Stephen Philips) – Sound-O-Mat Recordings, 2005; co-released by Dark Duck Records
11. faded DVD – Sound-O-Mat Recordings, 2006
12. Pulse – Hypnos "Secret Sounds" imprint, 2007
13. mirror – Blue Water Records, 2007
14. The Sound of Silence I: An Unnatural History of Rare and Unusual Tracks – Sound-O-Mat Recordings, 18 Jan 2008
15. Solyaris – Hypnos, 2008

=== Compilations ===
Each is a single track title followed by the compilation it appeared on.

1. Diapason on The Drone Download Project Year 1 – Dark Duck Records
2. Whainer (CD-only bonus track) on The Drone Download Project Year 1 – Dark Duck Records
3. Tea-Totaled on The Drone Download Project Year 2 – Dark Duck Records
4. The Hills Are Alive on Full Cold Moon: A Tribute to Jhonn Balance – Dark Winter
5. Big Bang into Particle Acceleration on Space Collaboration – The Ambient Collective
6. Wend on The Drone Download Project Year 3 – Dark Duck Records
7. The Cuce on Orgambient: Long Form Ambient Vol. 1 – Blue Water Records
8. Alchemy (Gold Into Lead demix) on Lena – Alchemy of Fingers and Dark – Hypnos
9. Puissant on The Drone Download Project Year 4 – Dark Duck Records
10. Fasciculate on The Drone Download Project Year 5 – Dark Duck Records
11. Crystil on Messages from a Subatomic World – Hypnos

All Austere releases are distributed by the ambient label Hypnos Records. In 2007, the band signed with both Hypnos Records and Blue Water Records.
