= Autumn Tears =

International dark wave project

- Origin: Billerica, Massachusetts, United States
- Genres: Dark wave
- Years active: 1995–present
- Labels: Dark Symphonies; The Circle Music
- Past members: Erika Swinnich
- Website: autumntears.bandcamp.com

Autumn Tears is an international neoclassical dark wave studio project formed in September 1995 by Erika T. Swinnich and Ted Tringo.

== History ==
Erika Swinnich, a vocalist and Ted Tringo, a keyboardist and pianist player, created Autumn Tears in Billerica, Massachusetts. After rehearsing and creating songs for the album, they released their debut CD, Love Poems for Dying Children… Act I in April 1996. They released the album under the label Dark Symphonies through West Sound Studio.

They released a second album, The Garden of Crystalline Dreams – Love Poems for Dying Children: Act II in May 1997.

In May 1997, Autumn Tears released their follow-up album, Love Poems for Dying Children...Act II: The Garden of Crystalline Dreams which sold more than 10.000 units. After this, Swinnich left the act to pursue her novel writing and was replaced by Jennifer LeeAnna, who made her debut in The Intermission.

Absolution, a mini-CD, was released in July 1999. The band then released Love Poems for Dying Children, Act III: Winter and the Broken Angel, the third and final full-length album to the Acts trilogy in June 2000. During this time, Swinnich also rejoined as a full-time member.

Autumn Tears released Eclipse in 2004 and Swinnich left again to form her own band. The Hallowing was released in June 2007, after which the band went on hiatus until 2018. Tringo then stated the hiatus was because he wanted to study music and composition.

They returned in 2018 with The Origin of Sleep, featuring a more classical style with using live classical musicians. More albums followed in succession in the following years, which include Colors Hidden Within The Gray (2019), The Air Below The Water (2020) and The Glow of Desperation (2021).

In February 2022, Autumn Tears released a split album with Zeresh called Widowing.

== Members ==
=== Current lineup ===
- Ted Tringo – Composition, arrangements, lyrics, piano:
- Caroline Joy Clarke – Lead and backing vocals, vocal and lyric arrangements
- Darren Clarke – Lead and backing vocals, vocal and lyric arrangements
- Tamar Singer – Lead and backing vocals, vocal and lyric arrangements
- Anne "Anaé" Laurent – Lead and backing vocals, vocal and lyric arrangements
- Agnete Mangnes Kirkevaag – Lead and backing vocals, vocal and lyric arrangements
- Ann–Mari Edvardsen Alexis – Lead and backing vocals, vocal and lyric arrangements
- Dawn Desireé Smith – Lead and backing vocals, vocal and lyric arrangements
- Bróna Mcvittie – Lead and backing vocals, vocal and lyric arrangements
- Nathan Nasby – Lead and backing vocals, vocal and lyric arrangements
- Ffion Elisa Williams – Lead vocals and vocal arrangements
- Soroush Abedi – Composition, accompaniment, arrangements and percussion
- Artur Silveiro – Composition, accompaniment, arrangements and percussion
- Jess Townsend – Violin, viola
- Tom McCluskey – Cello
- Sanja Smileska – Violin, viola
- Sanja Smileska – Viola
- Mercedes Bralo – Harp
- Val Cortoni – Hammered dulcimer
- Kelly O'Donohue – Trumpet, trombone
- Oli Parker – Trumpet
- Matt Giella – Trumpet
- Josué García García – Trumpet
- María Gabriela Soto – Trombone
- Austris Apenis – French horn
- Claude Lumley – French horn
- Giulia Cacciavillani – Flute, piccolo
- Alia Fay – Wooden traverse flute, tin whistle
- Sasko Temelkoski – Clarinet
- Carolina Prado Sánchez – Oboe
- Callum Edwards – Snare drum

=== Past members ===
- (1995–2004) Erika (Swinnich) Tandy – Lead and backing vocals, composition and keyboards.

== Discography ==
=== Albums ===
- Love Poems for Dying Children - Act I (1996)
- Love Poems for Dying Children... Act II: The Garden of Crystalline Dreams (1997)
- Love Poems for Dying Children - Act III - Winter and the Broken Angel (2000)
- Eclipse (2004)
- The Hallowing (2007)
- Colors Hidden Within The Gray (2019)
- The Air Below The Water (2020)
- The Glow of Desperation (2021)
- Widowing (2022)
- Guardian of the Pale (2023)
- Crown Of The Clairvoyant (2025)

=== Singles & EP ===
- Absolution (1999)
- The Origin of Sleep (2018)
