= Atrium Carceri =

Swedish musical project

- Origin: Sweden
- Genres: Dark ambient, experimental, industrial
- Labels: Cold Meat Industry, Cryo Chamber
- Members: Simon Heath
- Website: cryochamberlabel.com

Atrium Carceri is a Swedish musical project by Simon Heath, initially released by industrial record label Cold Meat Industry. Fourteen full-length albums have been released so far, as well as fourteen collaboration albums together with other artists of the genre. In 2011 Atrium Carceri left Cold Meat Industry and started the Dark Ambient label Cryo Chamber. Simon Heath also released eleven albums under the name of his side project Sabled Sun.

== Style and themes ==
Atrium Carceri is typically described as dark ambient, black ambient and ambient industrial music. Similar to projects like Lull and Lustmord, Atrium Carceri uses synthesizers, sound effects, samples from films and anime, piano and other instrumentation to create slow rhythms, bitter melodies and complex textures generally based on themes of desolation, loneliness (solitary confinement) and environmental decay. Atrium Carceri has been praised by music critics and embraced by a cult audience for its atmospheric depth. According to Heath himself, each of Atrium Carceri's solo releases are centered around specific 'story arcs' within a 'grand story,' and following the releases of Reliquiae and Void in 2012, has made a flowchart detailing the story progression up to that point. The exact nature of the concept behind this 'grand story' has been intentionally left ambiguous by Heath, who's said it's "up to the listener and his/her interpretation" to piece together this story. The most popular video on Cryochamber is Songs for an empty world with over 3 million views. The Channel is mostly notable for its Winter Ambient Videos.

== Discography ==
Studio albums (as Atrium Carceri)

- Cellblock (2003)
- Seishinbyouin (2004)
- Kapnobatai (2005)
- Ptahil (2007)
- Souyuan (2008)
- Phrenitis (2009)
- Reliquiae (2012)
- Void (2012)
- The Untold (2013)
- The Old City – Leviathan (Official Soundtrack) (2015)
- Metropolis (2015)
- Archives 1–2 (2016)
- Codex (2018)
- Mortal Shell Soundtrack (2020)
- Forgotten Gods (2023)

Collaborations with other artists

- Sacrosanct (with Eldar) (2012)
- Cthulhu (Cryo Chamber Collaboration) (2014)
- Onyx (with Apocryphos and Kammarheit) (2015)
- Azathoth (Cryo Chamber Collaboration) (2015)
- Nyarlathotep (Cryo Chamber Collaboration) (2016)
- Echo (with Apocryphos and Kammarheit) (2017)
- Black Corner Den (with Cities Last Broadcast) (2017)
- Yog-Sothoth (Cryo Chamber Collaboration) (2017)
- Miles to Midnight (with Cities Last Broadcast and God Body Disconnect) (2018)
- Ur Djupan Dal (with Herbst9) (2018)
- Shub-Niggurath (Cryo Chamber Collaboration) (2018)
- Black Stage of Night (with Cities Last Broadcast) (2019)
- Hastur (Cryo Chamber Collaboration) (2019)
- Yig (Cryo Chamber Collaboration) (2020)
- Dagon (Cryo Chamber Collaboration) (2021)

As Sabled Sun

- 2145 (2012)
- 2146 (2012)
- Signals I (2013)
- Signals II (2013)
- Signals III (2013)
- Signals IV (2014)
- 2147 (2015)
- Signals V (2015)
- Signals VI (2015)
- 2148 (2016)
- 2149 (2021)
- 2150 (2024)

== See also ==
- List of dark ambient artists
- List of ambient music artists
