= Simon Heath =

Swedish composer (born 1977)

Simon Heath (born 1977 in Stockholm) is a Swedish composer and artist known for his work with Za Frûmi, Atrium Carceri, Abnocto, Krusseldorf and Mountain Realm. Heath also co-founded Za Frûmi with Simon Kölle and Donald Person. Heath has several other projects and also works on mastering other artists in the dark ambient scene. He is the founder of the dark ambient label Cryo Chamber.
