= This Census-Taker =

2016 novella by China Miéville

- First edition
- Author: China Miéville
- Cover artist: David G. Stevenson; Wusheng Wang; Photograph: Mt. Huangshan
- Language: English
- Genre: Speculative fiction novella
- Publisher: Pan MacMillan
- Publication date: February 2016
- Publication place: United Kingdom
- Media type: Print (hardcover)
- Pages: 160
- ISBN: 9781509812141
- OCLC: 908517395

This Census-Taker is a 2016 novella by British author China Miéville. It tells the story of a boy who witnesses a violent event, which he recalls initially as his mother killing his father, but later as his father killing his mother. Centred on the mysterious events surrounding the alleged murder, it is told alternately in the first and third-person by an unreliable narrator. The writing style is sparse, Kafkaesque and a departure from the detailed world-building of Miéville's prior work.

The book explores the uncertainty and trauma experienced by the boy and features secret messages and keys as motifs. Reviewers found the story creative and praised its eerie atmosphere, but were divided about the plot due to its open-endedness. NPR described the novella as "a beautiful chocolate that you bite into and find filled with blood", and The Scotsman found its unresolved nature tantalising, while The New York Times termed it "an exercise in haunting, lovely frustration".

== Background and setting ==
External videos
- Miéville interviewed by the novelist and scholar Jordy Rosenberg in 2017

This Census-Taker is China Miéville's eleventh book, following after nine novels and a novella. He has said he wishes to write in every genre, and his work has been labelled variously as fantasy, science fiction, horror and weird fiction. In a 2017 interview, Miéville felt he was entering a "middle period" in his writing and spoke of a new interest in novellas, which he found well-suited to explore trauma and "the unrepresentable". He expressed his enjoyment of fiction that is difficult to interpret, such as Franz Kafka's The Metamorphosis, and of "uneasy endings" that disorient readers. While noting a mixed response to This Census-Taker from some fans of his earlier work, Miéville described it as "the best thing I've done". He remarked that he liked the novella because he did not understand it himself; through it, he wished to communicate a feeling of estrangement and Sehnsucht.

The setting of the novella is an indeterminate town seemingly unrelated to any of Miéville's prior work. Three of his novels, King Rat, Kraken and Un Lun Dun, are set in a fictional version of London; The City and the City in a fictional Eastern Europe; Perdido Street Station, The Scar and Iron Council in a secondary world known as Bas-Lag; and Embassytown on a planet at the outskirts of the known universe. Some reviewers theorise that the town is part of Bas-Lag, a world with plant-like and aquatic inhabitants that the magazine Strange Horizons sees in the background of the novella.

== Plot summary ==
A boy witnesses a violent confrontation in his house. He flees downhill to a town and initially reports that his mother has killed his father, before amending his story and stating that his father killed his mother. Two volunteer law officials go up the hill to investigate, leaving the boy in the care of street urchins with whom he is friends. The volunteers return after seeing no evidence of violence and report a letter purportedly from the mother saying that she was leaving. They return the boy to his father's care.

The narrative shifts to the past. The relationship between the boy's parents was tense, and he occasionally witnesses the father killing animals and throwing the corpses into a crevasse in a nearby cave. The boy suspects that his father has also killed people in the same way. His mother grows crops, takes them to the town to trade and scavenges in the deserted areas of the settlement. In conversations with the boy, she says that his father came from a city, wanting to escape from it. His father makes keys for the townspeople who come to visit him, which have magical properties attributed to them.

The present-day boy fears his father, still believing that he has killed his mother and that he has hidden the body in the hole within the cave. He attempts to run away, crossing the bridge to the other half of the town with the street children. They are followed and after being beaten by an official, the boy is collected by the father. One day, a man with a gun identifying as a census-taker appears while the boy's father is away. He claims to be from the father's city and is responsible for locating and accounting for its inhabitants. He descends into the hole after hearing of the boy's belief as to his mother's fate, although what he finds is not revealed. He tells the boy to hide himself while he awaits his father's return. After some time, the census-taker reappears and drops something into the hole that the boy does not see. He offers the boy the chance to leave with him and become his associate, which the boy accepts.

Sections set in the future imply that the boy has been imprisoned and is recording the information that he has collected in three books. He had a predecessor who also worked with the census-taker, whose fate is unclear and may have been present in the town during the events of the past. A coded message within the book he is writing states that the census-taker was rogue.

== Style and themes ==
"A boy ran down a hill path screaming. The boy was I. ... [I]t seemed many times as if he would fall into the rocks and gorse that surrounded the footpath, but I kept my feet and descended into the shadow of my hill."

— First- and third-person shifts in This Census-Taker, p. 1.

This Census-Taker is told in a sparse, minimalist style that extends from its characters to its world: the protagonist is unnamed and his memories fractured, the setting bleak and spare. This is a marked change from the detailed, baroque world-building of Miéville's prior work. The scholar Carl Freedman sees the influences of Franz Kafka and Italo Calvino in the story, while Eric Sandberg feels that it highlights a general trend towards minimalism in Miéville's career. At the same time, Sandberg remarks that a love of language and wordplay is a key element of Miéville's writing, warning that "even his most restrained work can be (mis)characterized as 'dictionary‐drunk'". While some reviewers classify This Census-Taker as fantasy, Sandberg views it as crossing genre boundaries.

The novella revolves around themes of trauma and uncertainty. The narrator fluctuates between first- and third-person from the beginning of the story, his perception shaken by the violent event he has witnessed (the supposed death of his mother). His memory stays fragmented throughout, and at the end, his adult self is unsure if his mother is even dead or alive. According to Freedman, the protagonist's personal trauma is mirrored by the setting's "social trauma". Much of the town is dilapidated and filled with ruined machinery and buildings; there are hints that this is not a natural occurrence, but a result of war and military violence. The father's violence towards animals and disposal of bodies into a deep hole, among other events, add to the uncanny atmosphere. Nicoletta Vallorani sees the hole, where the mother's body supposedly lies, as a symbol of uncertainty. In her view, when the boy jumps over the hole at the end of the story, he accepts that his past trauma will never be explained; he moves on and thus comes of age.

Coded messages and keys are recurring motifs in the story. The census-taker instructs the boy to write three books: one relating to the census, a second book for readers, and a third, cryptic book for himself. The novella itself is implied to be the second book, and sections related to the census are sometimes narrated in the second person. The third book of the previous census-taker states:

The Hope Is So:
Count Entire Nation. Subsume Under Sets. –
Take Accounts. Keep Estimates. Realize
Interests. So
Reach Our Government's Ultimate Ends.

The capitalised letters spell out the message "this census-taker is rogue", and the boy appends a similar code that reads "I know". He however replaces "the hope" with "this hate", which he then crosses out. In a related motif, the boy's father is a key-maker whose keys do not open physical locks, but unlock desires, money and travel. Reviewers and readers have attempted to discern gaps in the story and its setting; some believe that it is set in Miéville's Bas-Lag universe.

== Reception ==
Several critics found the novella imaginative and lauded its atmospheric narrative. Speaking generally of Miéville's career, The Guardian said that he "forces a redefinition of what fantasy can be" with each book he publishes and highlighted This Census-Taker's focus on realism, with fantasy appearing at the edges and in the narrative style. The Telegraph similarly remarked on Miéville's "astonishing facility" for creativity and found the book eerie and atmospheric. Describing it as an exploration of trauma and narrative strategy, the Los Angeles Review of Books stated that the story had "moments of extreme and visceral violence" yet was evocative and haunting. NPR likewise summed it up as "a beautiful chocolate that you bite into and find filled with blood".

Reactions to the plot varied. The Spectator criticised the ending of the book as abrupt and confusing, while The New York Times termed it "an exercise in haunting, lovely frustration" due to the story's open-endedness. Finding the plot "maddeningly vague", The Millions faulted the novella as "a bad book by a very fine writer", and admired Miéville for venturing outside his comfort zone, if only to fail. A review in Slate likewise felt the plot was at times too obtuse and unfinished. On the contrary, The Scotsman found the unresolved questions tantalising and felt that puzzling them out was a main draw of the novella. In a similar viewpoint, Locus suggested that the ending would be haunting and provocative for the right reader, as did HuffPost, which said the novella was not for "the 'Inception'-averse", but that others would find it a "moody, ethereal read".

Miéville's prose also drew commentary; Slate described him as an "ambitious prose stylist". The reviewer felt his language was at times too purple, but praised how it added to the story's sense of uncertainty. A more negative view was offered by The Millions, which bemoaned Miéville's "murky descriptions". Conversely, several other critics found his writing subtle and understated. The Telegraph praised the language as "precise as the writing done by a monumental mason", while NPR compared it to "writing with diamonds".

The book was nominated for the 2017 Hugo and Locus Awards for Best Novella.

== Works cited ==
- Baker, Daniel (2019). "Staring into Black: China Miéville's This Census-Taker, the Fantastic, and Perceptual Coding". Journal of the Fantastic in the Arts. 30 (3): 352–372. ProQuest 2475534388.
- Freedman, Carl (2016). "China Miéville, This Census-Taker: A Novella". Foundation. 45 (125): 106–109. ProQuest 1860061587.
- Rosenberg, Jordy (18 January 2017). China Miéville, Conversation (YouTube). Lannan Foundation.
- Sandberg, Eric (2021). "China Miéville". In Bradford, Richard (ed.). The Wiley Blackwell Companion to Contemporary British and Irish Literature. Wiley-Blackwell. pp. 561–570. doi:10.1002/9781118902264.ch53. ISBN 978-1-119-65306-6. S2CID 241226002.
- Vallorani, Nicoletta (2020). "Of Borders and (W)holes. Porous Geographies of the Fantastic in China Miéville and Nora K. Jemisin". In Punter, David; Mancini, C. Bruna (eds.). Space(s) of the Fantastic. Routledge. doi:10.4324/9780367680305-11. ISBN 978-0-367-68030-5. S2CID 229399328.
