= Carl Freedman (writer) =

American writer and academic (born 1951)

- Born: 1951 (age 74–75); North Carolina, U.S.
- Occupations: Writer, academic
- Writing career
- Notable works: Critical Theory and Science Fiction (2000)
- Notable awards: Pilgrim Award (2018)
- Title: William A. Read Professor of English Literature

Academic background
- Education: Yale University
- Website: www.cfreedman.com

Carl Howard Freedman (born 1951) is an American writer, literary theorist and professor of English literature at Louisiana State University. He is best known for the non-fiction book Critical Theory and Science Fiction, and his scholarly work on the writer Philip K. Dick. Freedman's other works include a series of books on Isaac Asimov, Ursula K. Le Guin and Samuel R. Delany, and several essays and a book on China Miéville. In 2018, he won the Pilgrim Award for lifetime contribution to science fiction and fantasy scholarship.

== Life and career ==
Carl Freedman was born in North Carolina in 1951. He received his BA in English from the University of North Carolina at Chapel Hill and Oxford University, and his PhD from Yale University. He is currently the William A. Read Professor of English literature at Louisiana State University, where he was named a distinguished research master in 2013.

Freedman's most highly cited work is his 2000 book, Critical Theory and Science Fiction, where he examines the analytical potential of science fiction. He places science fiction above all other genres in terms of "historical concreteness and rigorous self-reflectiveness", and thus as the most sound genre for academic study. The book focuses on novels from five authors:

- The Dispossessed by Ursula K. Le Guin
- The Man in the High Castle by Philip K. Dick
- Solaris by Stanisław Lem
- Stars in My Pocket Like Grains of Sand by Samuel R. Delany
- The Two of Them by Joanna Russ

It presents the case that the above works constitute the "aesthetic and political core" of science fiction. Freedman employs the notion of science fiction as "cognitive estrangement", an idea popularized by academic Darko Suvin. This has been described as a Marxist and utopian approach to science fiction: by placing readers in a world different from their own, it challenges them to imagine alternatives to the status quo.

Freedman is also known for his essays on the writer Philip K. Dick, where he studies the prevalence of paranoia in Dick's works. His Literary Conversations series of books (2005–09) contain extended interviews with Isaac Asimov, Ursula K. Le Guin, and Samuel R. Delany. Freedman has also authored essays on Marxism and China Miéville. His 2015 book, Art and Idea in the Novels of China Miéville, studies six of his novels: King Rat; the three Bas-Lag books, Perdido Street Station, The Scar and Iron Council; The City and the City; and Embassytown. It has been described as "essential reading" for discussion of Miéville's work.

Other writers that have been the subject of Freedman's work include Robert A. Heinlein and Kim Stanley Robinson, with focus on their authorship of utopian science fiction. Freedman has also written books on U.S. electoral politics, and on film.

== Recognition ==
Freedman received the 1999 Pioneer Award for Excellence in Scholarship for his essay "Kubrick's 2001 and the Possibility of a Science-Fiction Cinema". In 2018, he was awarded the Pilgrim Award for Lifetime Achievement by the Science Fiction Research Association.

== Bibliography ==
=== As author ===
- George Orwell: A Study in Ideology and Literary Form, 1988
- Critical Theory and Science Fiction, 2000
- The Incomplete Projects: Marxism, Modernity, and the Politics of Culture, 2002
- The Age of Nixon: A Study in Cultural Power, 2012
- Versions of Hollywood Crime Cinema: Studies in Ford, Wilder, Coppola, Scorsese, and Others, 2013
- Art and Idea in the Novels of China Miéville, 2015

=== As editor ===
- Conversations with Isaac Asimov, 2005
- Conversations with Ursula K. Le Guin, 2008
- Conversations with Samuel R. Delany, 2009
