= Estate (2020 film) =

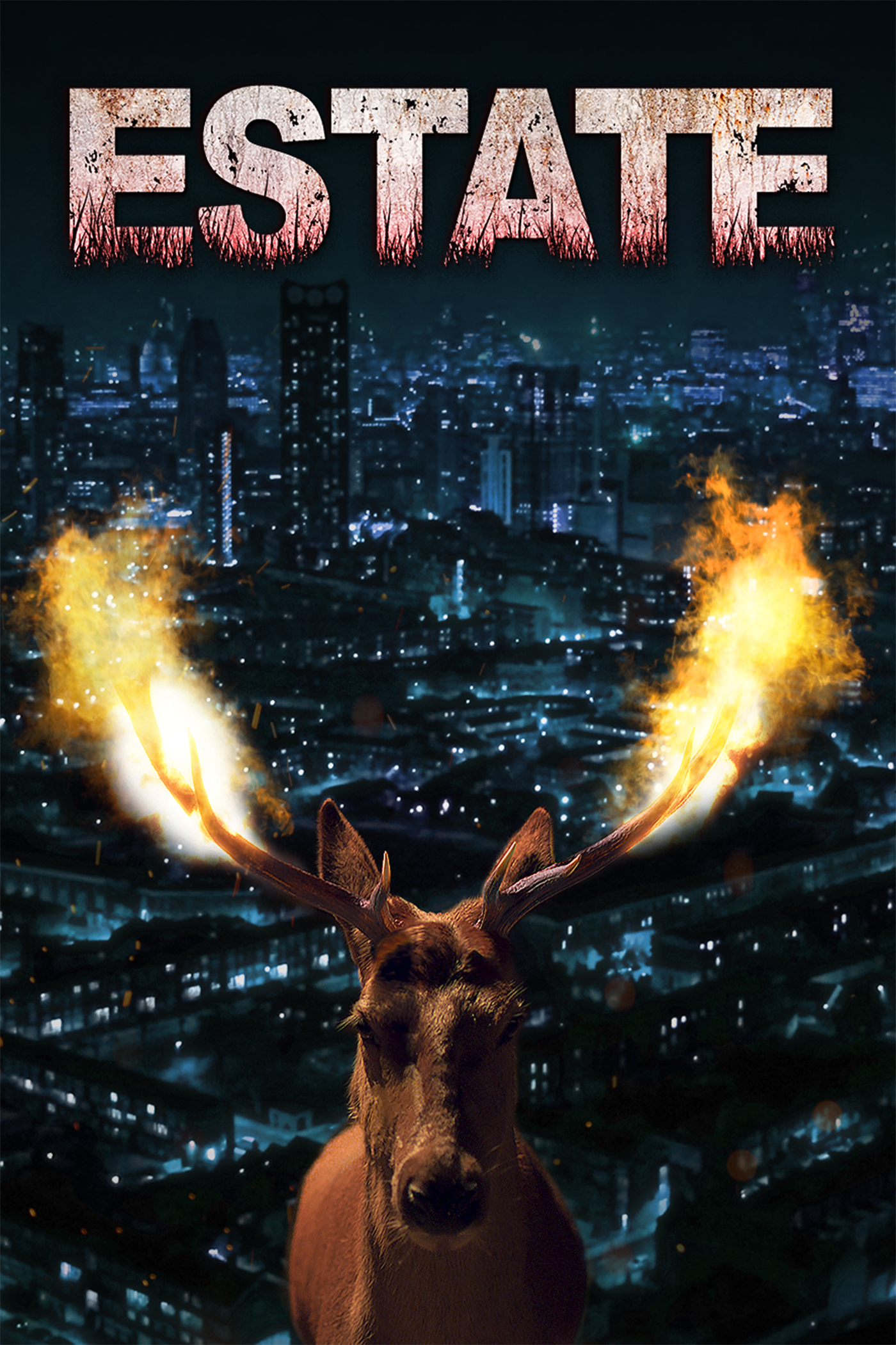
- Directed by: Tom Harberd
- Screenplay by: Tom Harberd
- Based on: Estate by China Miéville
- Produced by: Nicholas Goulden; Tom Harberd
- Starring: Samuel Anderson; Dominique Tipper; Martin McCann
- Release date: 14 August 2020
- Running time: 25 minutes
- Country: United Kingdom
- Language: English

Estate is a 2020 short film based on the short story of the same name by China Miéville, written and directed by Tom Harberd.

First published in The White Review, the original short story on which the film is based was republished in the 2015 collection Three Moments of an Explosion.

== Synopsis ==
Rick lives in an estate where he witnesses daily casual cruelty towards animals. His neighbors leave out poison for urban foxes while a man abuses his dog after losing at the slot machines. Rick reconnects with a former schoolmate Diane, with whom he discusses a mutual former acquaintance, Dan, who has returned to the estate.

They walk through the estate and come upon a basketball court where they witness Dan leading a strange pagan ritual where he marks several individuals before sending them in different directions. Dan himself then leaves when the ritual draws the attention of the police. Rick and Diane come across Dan shortly thereafter in the back alleys of the estate, where he briefly acknowledges Rick before turning his attention towards hunting a stag with flaming antlers.

Following the stag, Rick watches as the fire on its antlers grows in size and intensity; pieces of burning material start to drop from the antlers onto its body, but it doesn't seem to notice. The animal is struck by a speeding car when it pauses on a bridge. Not wanting the animal to suffer, Rick shoots it to death using a rifle that Dan was carrying. Dan then tries to talk to Rick about the power of violence, and the need to push people out of their comfort zones, before disappearing at the sound of approaching police sirens.

The following day Rick discovers that the stag's antlers had been soaked in flammable substances and drugged so it wouldn't feel the fire. This upsets him, however Diane states that she somewhat understands Dan's position. The event has a rippling impact on the community. Diane is inspired to resume painting wall murals, now depicting the stag, while pieces of the antler are being sold in a similar fashion to drugs. Rick purchases a piece after witnessing its impact on the abused dog, which turns on its abusive caretaker.

Later Rick notices that the antler is affecting the signal on his TV, as it introduces a strange kind of distortion to the signal. Placing it on the router allows him to view footage from a pagan ritual held a year prior in the countryside. Noticing that Dan was a participant, Rick leaves the estate the following morning to follow in Dan's footsteps and learn what he learnt.

One year later, Rick returns to the city, which has been beset with a number of animal-related events, such as animals breaking out of London Zoo and running through the streets. The piece of antler has now been fashioned into a whistle, and as Rick blows it, the foxes of the estate start to rise up against the people who were abusing them.

== Release ==
Estate was given a digital release via the official website and through Vimeo on August 14, 2020.

== Critical response ==
Critical reception for Estate has been positive. The film earned a 4 star review from Starburst Magazine's Alan Boon, who noted its polished cinematography and said that "there was plenty to like and admire" in the film, as well as that the film left "you wanting more from not only the director and his cast, but also from the world in which it is set." SFX Magazine highlighted the performance of "Samuel Anderson (Doctor Who's Danny Pink) who is appealingly soulful as the sensitive hero of this strange fable."

SciFiNow echoed the sentiments of both reviews, highlighting Anderson's acting and the cinematography in their review.
