= The Tain (novella) =

2002 fantasy novella by China Miéville

- The cover of the 2002 printing of The Tain.
- Author: China Miéville
- Cover artist: Les Edwards (using his Edward Miller pseudonym)
- Language: English
- Genre: Fantasy
- Publisher: PS Publishing
- Publication date: October 2002
- Publication place: United Kingdom
- Media type: Print (hardcover)
- Pages: 92
- ISBN: 1-902880-64-1
- OCLC: 58401127

The Tain is a fantasy novella by British author China Miéville.

== Publication history ==
It was first published by PS Publishing in 2002, accompanied by an introduction by M. John Harrison. It has since been featured in the 2004 anthology Cities, edited by Peter Crowther, as well as Miéville's 2005 short story collection Looking for Jake.

== Plot synopsis ==
The story follows Sholl, a man living in London soon after a convulsive onslaught by unearthly beings. Through introspective monologues on both sides of the fight, the reader learns of the history of the attacking imagos and "vampires", and the reasons behind the invasion.

== Reception ==
Infinity Plus describes it as "a story which uses the tropes of the fantastic to address the real world's injustices", and compares it to the work of Lucius Shepard."

Bookotron reviewed it:

With Mieville, the prose, as always, is the thing. He can turn a gorgeous phrase and send it skipping across the lexicons of the literary landscape like a mirror shard hurled at a mirror. He can conjure effortlessly, slip from the simple into the surreal with a weightless word or two. Mieville successfully avoids the trap that genre fiction sets for its best practitioners. He steps past the snare of genre-for-genre's-sake and easily writes what feels like simple fiction. Paradoxically, it's not at all simple, and the strangeness within unfolds in the reader's brain like the flavor of a fine wine exploding on the tongue.

Aaron Hughes reviewed the book for Fantastic Reviews:

Miéville credits Jorge Luis Borges for the concept of the imagos, but he handles the idea and its metaphoric implications absolutely brilliantly.

First, Miéville infuses the concept with his own unique brand of weird imagery, such as swarms of floating lips once caught in a compact mirror puckering for their lipstick and disembodied hands hooking thumbs together and fluttering like vultures over London and the eerily non-reflective Thames River. Miéville also elaborates cleverly on Borges' original idea, telling us for example that advance scouts from the tain have been among us for centuries, giving rise to the legend of vampires, since naturally they have no reflection.

Even more impressively, Miéville actually gets you to give a damn about it all. The idea of the world being attacked by the beings on the other side of the mirror is pretty cool, but also pretty goofy. It has no business in a story any more serious than a Lewis Carroll satire. But somehow China Miéville is able to pull it into a serious, moody, sometimes frightening drama and compel the reader to care about it, and he seems to do it with about as much ease as the rest of us compel the person in the mirror to mimic us.
