= Colin Barker =

British historian and sociologist (1939–2019)

- Born: 30 June 1939
- Died: 4 February 2019 (aged 79–80)
- Occupations: Sociologist, historian, writer

Colin Barker (30 June 1939 – 4 February 2019) was a British sociologist as well as a Marxist historian and writer. A former long-standing member of the Socialist Workers Party in Manchester, he was the author of numerous articles and works on Marxism, including a history of the Polish trade union Solidarity, Festival of the Oppressed.

== Biography ==
A Trotskyist, Barker was a member of the International Socialism Group in Oxford and Manchester from 1962. He was a Senior Lecturer in Sociology at Manchester Metropolitan University from 1967 to 2002 and an organiser of the periodic International Conference on Alternative Futures and Popular Protest there.

Barker regularly spoke at the Socialist Workers Party's annual Marxism event. In 2013, he joined opposition to the SWP Central Committee's handling of the allegations of rape made against 'Comrade Delta'. He left the organisation in 2014 and joined the newly formed Revolutionary Socialism in the 21st Century (rs21) group.

== Books ==
- The Power Game. London: Pluto, 1972. ISBN 978-0-902818-17-0.
- Festival of the Oppressed: solidarity, reform and revolution in Poland, 1980-81. London: Bookmarks, 1986. ISBN 978-0-906224-27-4.
- Revolutionary Rehearsals (editor) (1987).
- Marxism and Social Movements (co-editor). Leiden: Brill, 2013. ISBN 978-9-004211-75-9.
- Revolutionary Rehearsals in the Neoliberal Age (co-editor). Chicago: Haymarket, 2021. ISBN 978-1-642594-68-3
