= Railsea =

2012 novel by China Miéville

- Cover of the first US hardcover edition of Railsea
- Author: China Miéville
- Language: English
- Genre: Young adult fiction, weird fiction
- Publisher: Del Rey Books
- Publication date: 15 May 2012
- Publication place: United Kingdom
- Pages: 448
- ISBN: 978-0345524522

Railsea is a young adult novel written and illustrated by English writer China Miéville, and published in May 2012. Miéville described the novel as "weird fiction", io9 labelled its mix of fantasy and steampunk elements as "salvagepunk" and the story has been seen as an "affectionate parody" of Herman Melville's classic 1851 novel Moby-Dick, also drawing on Robert Louis Stevenson's adventure novels Treasure Island and Kidnapped.

== Setting ==
Railsea is set on a world whose lands are covered by endless interconnecting tracks of rails, known as the "railsea". The earth is colonised by ravenous giant naked mole-rats and other carnivorous giant forms of familiar animals, such as earwigs and antlions as well as stranger non-identifiable creatures that reside in the polluted sky. These threats mean that humanity are confined to 'islands' of harder rock through which the animals cannot burrow and the spaces between can only be safely traversed by use of trains.

== Plot ==
Sham ap Soorap is a young assistant doctor on a moletrain, captained by Abacat Naphi, that hunts giant moles for meat in a similar fashion to whaling. Naphi is especially obsessed with one mole named Mocker-Jack and after one encounter, they discover an abandoned train. Sham enters it, discovering a corpse and a camera buried in the ground. Sham and Naphi view the images and are shocked to see an image of a single rail leading off into the distance, an apparent impossibility as it is believed that the railsea is endless.

As rumours spread of Sham's discovery, his investigations lead him to Caldera and Dero Shroake. They are the son and daughter of two explorers who ventured to the furthest reaches of the railsea before disappearing. Sham tells them of the content of the camera, and they resolve to retrace their parents steps aboard their own train. Sham returns to the moletrain. Before it departs, he is captured by pirates who demand that he provide them with instructions as to how to reach the Shroakes as they believe that there is treasure to be found beyond the railsea.

After receiving a message from Sham, Naphi reluctantly abandons the chase for Mocker-Jack and sets out to find him. Sham convinces his former trainmates to assist the Shroakes, who are being sought by both pirates and the navy. They rescue them from their now almost incapacitated train and with a navy wartrain in close pursuit, venture out onto the lonely rail leaving the sea behind them. After a three way confrontation between the navy, Mocker-Jack and a robotic sentinel train that guards the exit of the railsea, the mole train escapes and Mocker-Jack falls into a chasm.

The moletrain crew decide to return with their valuable salvage to the known world, whilst Sham and the Shroakes press on by foot to see what lies beyond. They are joined by Naphi, who is now directionless following the death of Mocker-Jack. They reach the end of the line and find the ancient descendants of the railway controllers, confirming an ancient rumour; that the seemingly endless complexity of the railsea is nothing more than the result of rampant rail development by unscrupulous developers in the distant past. After reaching an ocean they take a boat, left by the Shroakes' parents, and sail out into the unknown.

== Reception ==
Railsea was generally well received by critics. USA Today's reviewer appreciated Miéville's mix of "emotional drama, Godzilla-esque monster carnage" and high adventure that would satisfy teenagers as well as Miéville's adult fans. Stephanie Burt remarked on Miéville's inventive language and world-building, and noted that the author's far-left politics are reflected in the slowly emerging history of Railsea's derelict world, which amounts to a "funny, far-reaching indictment of modern capitalism".

Several reviewers highlighted the metafictional nature of the novel. Writing for io9, Chris Hsiang noted that it abounds with "impish literary games", and praised its avoidance of either "dystopian romance tropes" or political sermonising in favour of a challenging, weird but still approachable language and structure. Others were more critical of Railsea's metafictional approach. Jason Heller of the A.V. Club wrote that while Miéville's swift and absorbing (if dense) prose and lean plot yielded a "brainy and thrilling" result, it would have been improved "if only he'd stopped less to comment on his own cleverness along the way".
