= Kraken (novel) =

2010 novel by China Miéville

- First edition
- Author: China Miéville
- Cover artist: Elisa Lazo Valdez
- Language: English
- Genre: Urban fantasy, Weird fiction
- Publisher: Macmillan
- Publication date: 7 May 2010
- Publication place: United Kingdom
- Media type: Print (Hardcover)
- Award: Locus Award for Best Fantasy Novel (2011)
- ISBN: 0-333-98950-3

Kraken is a 2010 fantasy novel by British author China Miéville. It is published in the UK by Macmillan, and in the US by Del Rey Books. Handed in at the same time as The City & the City, it was chosen to be published at a later date to give the former breathing room. The book bears the subtitle An Anatomy on the title page. It was the winner for the 2011 Locus Award for Best Fantasy Novel.

Miéville has described the book as "a dark comedy about a squid-worshipping cult and the end of the world. It takes the idea of the squid cult very seriously. Part of the appeal of the fantastic is taking ridiculous ideas very seriously and pretending they’re not absurd."

== Plot ==
An inexplicable event has occurred at the Natural History Museum, London—a forty-foot specimen of giant squid in formalin has disappeared overnight. Additionally, a murder victim is found folded into a glass bottle. Various groups are interested in getting the squid back, including a naive staff member, a secret squad of the London Metropolitan Police, assorted religious cults, and various supernatural and mostly dead criminal elements. The squid represents deity to the Church of Kraken Almighty. Did they liberate their god, or could it have been stolen by a rival cult? The only thing that they all agree upon is that the fate of this embalmed kraken is intimately tied to the end of the world.

== Characters ==
- Billy Harrow, an employee at the Darwin Centre at the British Museum of Natural History. Billy discovers the kraken missing beginning his adventure into a world of magic, squid cults, and sentient tattoos.
- Dane Parnell, a security guard at the museum and a member of the Church of God Kraken who seeks to protect Billy.
- Chief Inspector Baron, head of the FSRC (Fundamentalist and Sect-Related Crimes Unit) of the Metropolitan Police Service.
- WPC Kath Collingswood, a police officer of the FSRC who is aided in her investigations by an "aetherial animal companion." (Woman Police Constable was an anachronistic police rank at the time of the novel's publication.)
- Patrick Vardy, Ph.D., a psychologist who consults the FSRC as a "cult profiler".
- Marge Tilley, a young woman in search of her missing boyfriend.
- The Tattoo, a former member of the Kray twins' criminal organization who was transformed into a nameless, sentient tattoo during his rise to power as a gangleader.
- Goss and Subby, unstoppable centuries-old assassins in the employ of The Tattoo.
- The Chaos Nazis, thugs in the employ of The Tattoo.
- Grisamentum, a dead magician who was chief rival to The Tattoo, whose former associates are forming new alliances.
- The Londonmancers, neutral prognosticators and protectors of the City of London.
- Wati, a living Egyptian afterlife familiar who heads the UMA, the Union of Magicked Assistants, on strike.

== Reception ==
Kraken won the 2011 Locus Award for Best Fantasy Novel.

In a review for The Guardian, Damien G Walter says: "Kraken seems as though Miéville is taking a step back from the artistic agenda that has previously informed his writing, perhaps to flex creative muscles grown stiff in the constraining seriousness of the New Weird. And Miéville sets about his dark comedy with almost unseemly relish." Similarly, in a review originally published in The Sydney Morning Herald, James Bradley observes, "[Kraken is] Miéville’s most stylistically exuberant work to date, not just gloriously adjectival ... but wildly creative as well, marrying a marvellous ear for the rhythms of London English to the cracked semi-scientific jargon of occult literature."
