= Neil Davidson (historian) =

Scottish intellectual (1957–2020)

- Born: 9 October 1957; Aberdeen, Scotland
- Died: 3 May 2020 (aged 62)
- Education: Aberdeen Grammar School; Open University
- Occupations: Author, historian, sociologist, civil servant, political activist
- Employer(s): Scottish Office (1987–1999); Scottish Government (1999–2008); University of Strathclyde (2008–2013); University of Glasgow (from 2013)
- Notable work: The Origins of Scottish Nationhood (2000); Discovering the Scottish Revolution, 1692–1746 (2003); How Revolutionary Were the Bourgeois Revolutions? (2012)
- Awards: Isaac and Tamara Deutscher Memorial Prize; Andrew Fletcher of Saltoun Award

Neil Davidson (9 October 1957 – 3 May 2020) was a left-wing Scottish intellectual and activist, best known for his work in Marxist history and the modern history of Scotland. In 2003, his book Discovering the Scottish Revolution was awarded the Saltire Society's Andrew Fletcher of Saltoun Award and the Isaac and Tamara Deutscher Memorial Prize. He has been described as a 'working-class autodidact of a rare kind, and undoubtedly the foremost intellectual of his generation on the Scottish radical left.'

== Early life ==
Neil Davidson was born in Aberdeen to radiographer Dougie Davidson and secretary Margaret Davidson (née Farquhar). He had one sister, Shona, and the family initially lived in a two-bedroom flat without an indoor toilet, before moving into a council house in 1967. Davidson's family originated in the village of Monymusk, which he visited on holidays as a child, and this connection to rural Scotland would influence his later intellectual work.

He attended Aberdeen Grammar School.

== Career ==
=== Civil service ===
After leaving school, Neil Davidson became a clerk in the Grampian Health Board, where his father worked as a radiographer. During this time, father and son both attended the same meetings of their trade union, NALGO. In 1987, he passed the civil service exam and began working for the Scottish Office. In the civil service, he was a member of the Public and Commercial Services Union, chairing the Scottish Office branch.

After powers were transferred to the Scottish Government in 1999, Davidson remained in the Scottish civil service, eventually becoming policy adviser to the first minister of Scotland and the finance minister. According to one obituary, Alex Salmond, the first minister from 2007, 'was astonished to find that a member of his staff was a Marxist'.

=== Academic career ===
Neil Davidson obtained a degree from the Open University (OU) in 1992 after five years of study, and subsequently worked for the same university as a tutor during the 1990s. At his graduation, he refused to wear the traditional academic gown 'on the grounds that it was a preposterous archaism.' He subsequently gave tutorials in sociology for the OU. He also taught for the Workers' Educational Association.

After leaving the civil service, in 2008 Davidson was appointed at the University of Strathclyde. This was not a permanent position, and came with a significant drop in income. According to Gregor Gall, Davidson 'found it hard to enter academia because selection panels did not appreciate his work or its places of publication like Pluto.'

In 2013, he secured a permanent lectureship at the University of Glasgow. During his academic career, Davidson published almost one hundred academic articles. He was a member of the University and College Union.

== Scholarship ==
Neil Davidson began writing whilst working in the civil service in London in the 1980s, getting up early to read Marxist literature and write during the mornings. From the 1990s, drawing on the Marxist concept of uneven and combined development, Davidson sought to explore the reasons that Scottish nationalism had 'been so weak when Scottish national consciousness was so strong'. He published The Origins of Scottish Nationhood in 2000, and in 2003 received the Saltire Society's Andrew Fletcher of Saltoun Award and the Isaac and Tamara Deutscher Memorial Prize for Discovering the Scottish Revolution.

His subsequent Deutscher Memorial Lecture formed the basis of his 2012 magnum opus, How Revolutionary Were the Bourgeois Revolutions?, which 'comprehensively argued for the reinstatement of the concept of the "bourgeois revolutions" for the understanding of global modernity.'

== Politics ==
An active socialist, Neil Davidson had joined the Socialist Workers Party (SWP) by 1978, having first encountered their precursor organisation in 1976 through Rock Against Racism and then the Anti-Nazi League.

In the 1990s, Davidson was a founder of the Edinburgh Campaign Against War in Europe, opposing NATO's involvement in the Yugoslav Wars. One demonstration that he organised was addressed by a newly-elected Member of the Scottish Parliament, Nicola Sturgeon. In the 2000s, he was a member of the Scottish Socialist Party, after the SWP joined in 2001. He helped to organise protests at the G8 summit in Scotland in 2005.

Having remained a 'thrawnly independent-minded' member through the 2000s, he left the SWP in 2013 during the internal crisis over the leadership's handling of rape allegations and helped to found Revolutionary Socialism in the 21st Century (rs21) in 2014.

Davidson was a supporter of Scottish independence, helping to establish the Radical Independence Campaign. He participated in the left-wing RISE alliance, which contested the 2016 Scottish Parliament election.

== Personal life ==
Whilst living in London in the 1980s, Neil Davidson's flatmate was author Andrew Murray Scott. Davidson met his life partner Cathy Watkins whilst they were both working at the Scottish Office. They moved together to Wester Hailes, Leith, and finally Cauther Ha' in West Lothian. In September 2019, during an international conference in Glasgow where he had debated with historian Robert Brenner, Davidson was rushed to hospital and diagnosed with a brain tumour. He died eight months later.

== Select bibliography ==
- The Origins of Scottish Nationhood (Pluto Books, 2000), ISBN 9780745316086
- Discovering the Scottish Revolution 1692–1746 (Pluto Books, 2003) ISBN 9780745320533
- How Revolutionary Were the Bourgeois Revolutions? (Haymarket Books, 2012) ISBN 9781608460670
