= Revolutionary Socialism in the 21st Century =

Political organisation in Britain

- Abbreviation: rs21
- Leader: Collective leadership (Steering group)
- Founded: 2014
- Split from: Socialist Workers Party
- Membership (2016): 250
- Ideology: Marxism; Revolutionary socialism; Eco-socialism
- International affiliation: None

Website
- revsoc21.uk

Revolutionary Socialism in the 21st Century (also known as rs21) is a political organisation in Britain. It was initially founded to "facilitate debate and clarify revolutionary socialist ideas, support collective work in workplace struggle and social movements, and argue for revolutionary socialism and Marxism". Its members are involved in trade unionism, as well as campaigning "around housing, Palestine solidarity, migrant rights, and many other issues."

John Kelly, an academic at Birkbeck, University of London, described rs21 as "relatively open-minded" and "less concerned with disseminating party lines on a variety of issues" than other, similar groups.

== History ==
rs21 was founded in the midst of a 2013–14 crisis over allegations of rape in the Socialist Workers Party (SWP) and the subsequent response by the SWP's leadership. In January 2014, 166 former members of the SWP, including Neil Davidson, Dave Renton and Colin Barker, left the SWP and founded rs21, releasing a founding statement to set out their aims. Approximately 1,800 members left the SWP during the crisis, leading to the creation of a number of breakaway groups. By 2015, rs21 was the only such group remaining.

In December 2016, rs21 member Ian Allinson announced his candidacy for the position of general secretary within Unite the Union. rs21 members supported his campaign in the subsequent 2017 general secretary election, with Allinson ultimately coming in third place with 17,143 votes (13.2%).
