= Dave Renton =

British barrister and historian

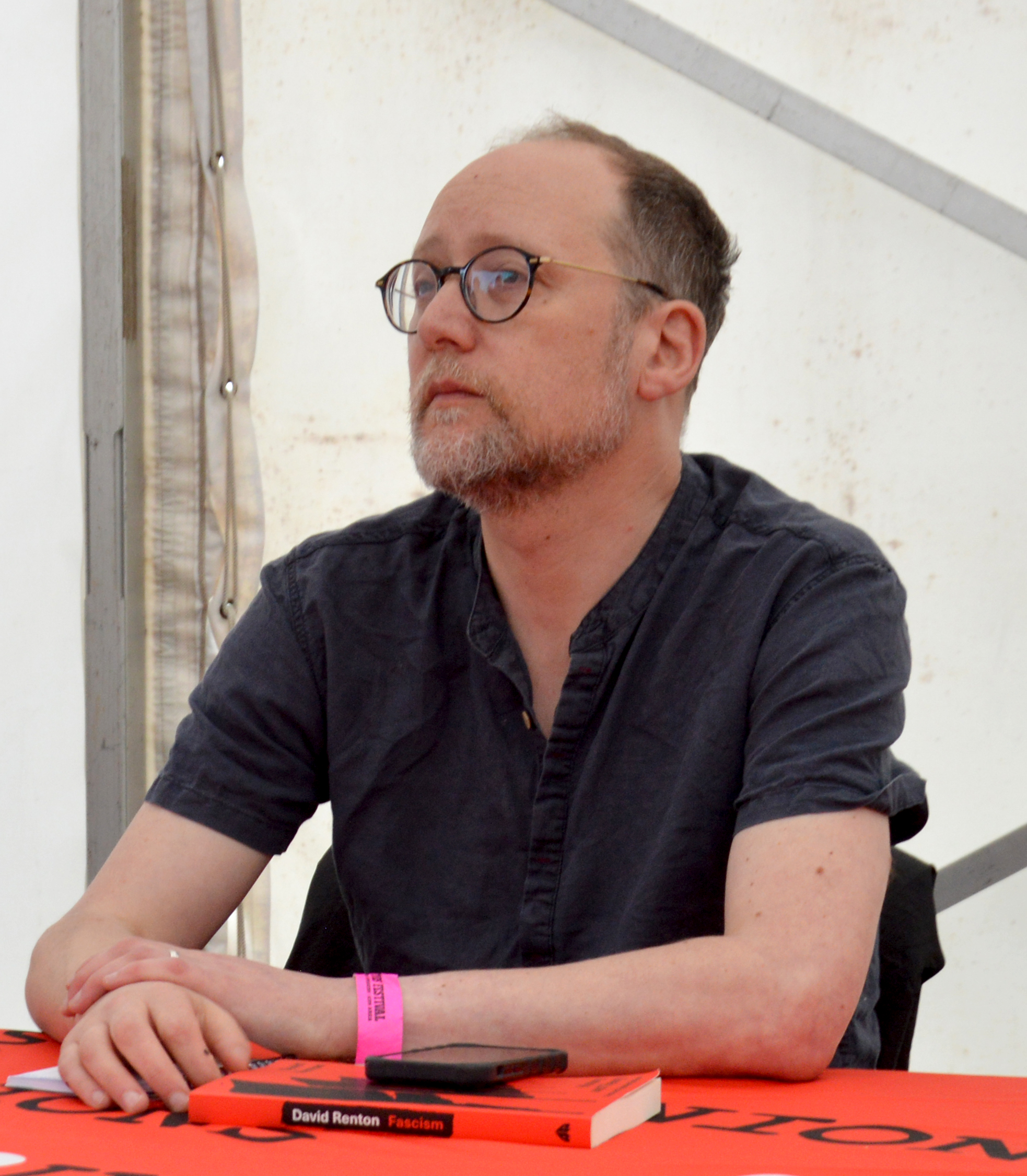
- Dave Renton in 2024
- Born: 1972 (age 53–54); London, England
- Occupations: Barrister, author, historian

Academic background
- Education: Eton College
- Alma mater: St John's College, Oxford; University of Sheffield
- Thesis: The attempted revival of British Fascism: Fascism and Anti-Fascism 1945-51. (1999)
- Doctoral advisors: Colin Holmes; Richard Thurlow

Academic work
- Discipline: History

David Renton (born 1972) is a British barrister, historian, and socialist. Renton has represented clients in a number of high-profile cases, especially concerning trade union rights and the protection of free speech.

Beginning his career as an academic historian, he has published over twenty books on the history and politics of fascism, anti-fascism, and the left. Renton is a former member of the Socialist Workers Party (SWP), and was a founding member of Revolutionary Socialism in the 21st Century (rs21) in 2014. He is also known for his writing for a range of left-wing publications as well as his blog, Lives; Running.

== Early life and education ==
Renton was born in London in 1972. His great aunt was the communist historian, Dona Torr. His grandfather was the shoe designer Kurt Geiger. One uncle was an activist in Equity, the actors' trade union, while another was the Conservative MP Tim Renton, Baron Renton of Mount Harry. He was educated at all-boys private boarding school Eton College where he became a member of the Labour Party. He then studied history at St John's College, University of Oxford.

== Academic career and writing ==
Renton received his PhD from the University of Sheffield for a thesis on fascism and anti-fascism in Britain after the Second World War.

Renton was an academic historian and sociologist, teaching at universities including Nottingham Trent, Edge Hill and Rhodes University and Johannesburg University in South Africa.

His PhD was turned into a book Fascism, Anti-Fascism and the 1940s, and is an account of the interactions between Oswald Mosley's Union Movement, its opponents in the 43 Group, and the police and courts. The historians Peter Davies and Derek Lynch described Renton as a "modern neo-Marxist historian whose Fascism: Theory and Practice is a useful guide to leftist interpretations of fascism." Never Again, his history of Rock Against Racism and the Anti-Nazi League, has been reviewed in The Spectator, The Herald and The Quietus.

== Law ==
Since 2009, Renton has practised as a barrister at Garden Court Chambers in London, in employment and housing law.

Renton's clients have included the Bank of Ideas and Dave Smith, a construction worker who in 2012 and 2013 sued Carillion (JM) Ltd for blacklisting, in the aftermath of the Consulting Association scandal. Renton represented Smith at the Employment Tribunal, Employment Appeal Tribunal, Court of Appeal and European Court of Human Rights. It was during Smith's Tribunal hearing that the information first came into the public domain that construction workers had been spied on by the police or security services.

In 2021, Renton represented Stan Keable of Labour Against the Witchhunt, at the Employment Appeal Tribunal, which held that Keable was unfairly dismissed for events occurring at the "Enough is Enough" protests against Jeremy Corbyn. The EAT upheld an order that Keable should be reinstated. In 2024, during protests against the genocide in Gaza, he represented the University of Birmingham student Mariyah Ali and other occupiers in contesting the university's right to expel the encampment.

Renton's book about working as a barrister during the COVID-19 lockdown, Jobs and Homes, was reviewed by Anna Minton in Prospect.

== Politics ==
Renton joined the Socialist Workers Party in 1991, but resigned in 2013 during the "Comrade Delta" crisis. Renton supported the female complainants against Martin Smith and became a prominent critic of the SWP leadership, publicly criticising their decisions in a series of posts published on his blog, Lives; Running. In January 2014, he helped to found Revolutionary Socialism in the 21st Century (rs21).

In 2012, Renton was one of the organisers of the 2012 Counter Olympics Network protest against the London Olympics and took part in protests highlighting the Olympics' role in the gentrification of East London.

In May 2014, he published a piece in the London Review of Books naming the individual who had been the police's principal suspect for the death of Blair Peach, and setting out deficiencies in the inquest which had prevented the jury from having access to findings of the police investigation in the killing.

== Selected publications ==
=== 1990s ===
- Red Shirts and Black: Fascists and Anti-Fascists in Oxford in the 1930s. Ruskin College, Oxford, 1996. ISBN 0-900183-19-5
- Fascism: Theory and practice. Pluto Press, London, 1999. ISBN 978-0-7453-1470-9

=== 2000s ===
- Fascism, Anti-Fascism and the 1940s. Palgrave MacMillan, Basingstoke, 2000. ISBN 978-0-312-22501-8
- Socialism in Liverpool: Episodes in a History of Working-class Struggle. Hegemon Press, 2000. (Editor) ISBN 978-0-9538098-0-6
- The Twentieth Century: A Century of Wars and Revolutions?. Rivers Oram Press, 2000. (edited with Keith Flett) ISBN 978-1-85489-126-6
- Marx on Globalization. Lawrence and Wishart, London, 2001. (Editor)
- This Rough Game: Fascism and Anti-fascism. Sutton, 2001. ISBN 978-0-7509-2515-0
- Classical Marxism: Socialist Theory and the Second International. New Clarion Press, 2002. ISBN 978-1-873797-36-5
- The Communist Party of Great Britain Since 1920. Palgrave Macmillan, Basingstoke, 2002. (With James Eaden) ISBN 978-0-333-94968-9
- New Approaches to Socialist History. New Clarion Press, 2003. (edited with Keith Flett) ISBN 978-1-873797-42-6
- Dissident Marxism: Past Voices for Present Times. Zed Books, London, 2004. ISBN 978-1-84277-292-8
- Sidney Pollard: A Life in History. Tauris, London, 2004. ISBN 978-1-85043-453-5
- Trotsky. Haus Publishing, London, 2004. ISBN 1-904341-62-4
- British Fascism, the Labour Movement and the State. Palgrave Macmillan, Basingstoke, 2005. ISBN 978-1-4039-3916-6 (Editor and contributor with Nigel Copsey)
- Colour Blind? Race and Migration in North East England. University of Sunderland Press, Sunderland, 2007. ISBN 978-1-873757-71-0
- When we Touched the Sky: The Anti-Nazi League 1977-1981. New Clarion Press, 2006. ISBN 978-1-873797-49-5
- CLR James: Cricket's Philosopher King. Haus Publishing, 2007.
- The Congo: Plunder and Resistance. Zed Books, London, 2007. (With Leo Zeilig and David Seddon) ISBN 978-1-84277-484-7

=== 2010s ===
- Lives; Running. Zero Books, Winchester, 2012. ISBN 978-1-78099-235-8
- Struck Out: Why Employment Tribunals Fail Workers and What Can be Done. Pluto Press, London, 2012. ISBN 978-0-7453-3256-7
- Socialism from Below: Writings from an Unfinished Tradition. Unkant Publishers, 2013. ISBN 978-0-9568176-2-4
- Never Again: Rock Against Racism and the Anti-Nazi League 1976-1982. Routledge, Abingdon, 2018. ISBN 978-1-138-50270-3
- The New Authoritarians: Convergence on the Right. Pluto Press, London, 2019. ISBN 978-0-7453-3817-0

=== 2020s ===
- Fascism: History and Theory. Pluto Press, London, 2020. ISBN 978-0-7453-4120-0
- Jobs and Homes: Stories of the Law in the Lockdown. Legal Action Group, London, 2021. ISBN 978-1-913648-19-0
- No Free Speech for Fascists: Exploring 'No Platform' in History, Law and Politics. Routledge, Abingdon, 2021. ISBN 0-367-72062-0
- Labour's Antisemitism Crisis: What the Left Got Wrong and How to Learn From It. Routledge, Abingdon, 2021. ISBN 0-367-72056-6
- Against the Law: Why Justice Requires Fewer Laws and a Smaller State. Repeater, London, 2022. ISBN 978-1-914420-17-7
- Horatio Bottomley and the Far Right Before Fascism. Routledge, Abingdon, 2022. ISBN 978-1-032304-37-3
- Discrimination in Housing Law. London, Legal Action, 2024. ISBN 978-1-913648-57-2
- Freedom of Speech and Employment Law. Routledge, Abingdon, 2025. ISBN 978-1-032724-24-9
- The story of Jenny Greenteeth: By one who knew her. London, Hegemon Press, 2025. ISBN 978-1-036918-76-7
- The Anti-Fascist Novel in Britain 1923–2023 12 Authors Take Sides. Routledge, Abingdon, 2026. ISBN 978-1-041269-14-4
