= Bourgeois revolution =

Rapid, fundamental political change from a feudal aristocracy to a capitalist democracy

The Storming of the Bastille on 14 July 1789 during the French Revolution; the French Revolution is viewed as the archetypal bourgeois revolution

Bourgeois revolution is a term used in Marxist theory to refer to a social revolution that aims to destroy a feudal system or its vestiges, establish the rule of the bourgeoisie, and create a capitalist state. In colonised or subjugated countries, bourgeois revolutions often take the form of a war of national independence. The Dutch, English, American, and French revolutions are considered the archetypal bourgeois revolutions, in that they attempted to clear away the remnants of the medieval feudal system, so as to pave the way for the rise of capitalism. The term is usually used in contrast to "proletarian revolution", and is also sometimes called a "bourgeois-democratic revolution".

== Theories of bourgeois revolution ==
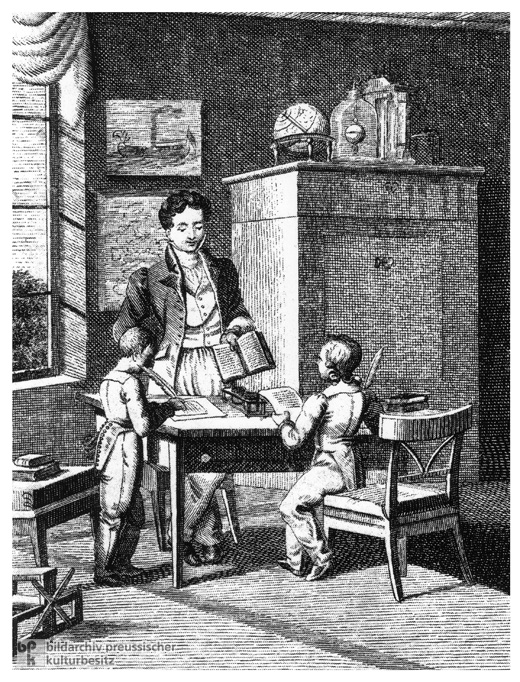
Starting in the late 18th century, the Bildungsbürger ("educated bourgeoise") class defined itself more on the basis of education than material possessions and thus great emphasis was laid upon the education of children.

According to one version of the two-stage theory, bourgeois revolution was asserted to be a necessary step in the move toward socialism, as codified by Georgi Plekhanov. In this view, countries that had preserved their feudal structure, like the Russian Empire, would have to establish capitalism via a bourgeois revolution before being able to wage a proletarian revolution. At the time of the Russian Revolution, the Mensheviks asserted this theory, arguing that a revolution led by bourgeoisie was necessary to modernise society, establish basic freedoms, and overcome feudalism, which would establish the conditions necessary for socialism. This view is prominent in Marxist–Leninist analysis.

Political sociologist Barrington Moore Jr. identified the bourgeois revolution as one of three routes from pre-industrial society to the modern world, in which a capitalist mode of production is combined with liberal democracy. Moore identified the English, French, and American revolutions as examples of this route.

Historian Neil Davidson believes that neither the establishment of democracy or the end of feudal relations are defining characteristics of bourgeois revolutions, but instead supports Alex Callinicos' definition of bourgeois revolution as being those that establish "an independent center of capital accumulation". Charles Post labels this analysis as consequentialism, where there is no requirement of the prior development of capitalism or bourgeois class agency for bourgeois revolutions, and that they are only defined by the effects of the revolutions to promote the development of capital accumulation.

Other theories describe the evolution of the bourgeoisie as not needing a revolution. The German bourgeoisie during the 1848 revolution did not strive to take command of the political effort and instead sided with the crown. Davidson attributes their behaviour to the late development of capitalist relations and uses this as the model for the evolution of the bourgeoisie.

Michael Löwy, building on Engels' analyses of such revolutions in the 19th century, and Antonio Gramsci's model of the "passive revolutions", distinguished the process of the unification of Germany as a "semi-revolution from above", where according to Löwy, such revolutions remained incomplete as they had little authentic popular mobilisation and were led by authoritarian or militaristic states, thus leaving remnants of their pre-feudal systems in place. He further argued that this resulted in contradictions which lead to democratic workers' movements and the revolutions of the 20th century century in Europe. Beyond Germany, Löwy also lists the Boshin War in Japan, the 1848 revolution in France, and the Risorgimento in Italy, as examples of "semi-revolutions from above", though he notes that the Risorgimento had a greater level of popular mobilisation than the others.

Left communists often view the revolutions leading to Communist states in the 20th century as "bourgeois revolutions".

== Goals of the bourgeois revolution ==
According to the Marxist view, the tasks of the bourgeois revolution include:

- The creation of the nation state, which can be constituted differently in different peoples.
- The constitution of the state on the basis of popular sovereignty; the rule of law is based on a constitution, which is adopted by the people.
- Bourgeois rule, if possible in the form of a democratic republic, which already found its complement in tyranny in antiquity.
- The abolition of serfdom and the formation of free wage workers instead.
- The separation of producers from the means of production in primitive accumulation.
- The abolition of the guilds and freedom of investment.
- The free development of the productive forces until they are ripe for social revolution.

== Bourgeois revolutions in history ==
=== Bourgeois revolutions in the Middle Ages ===
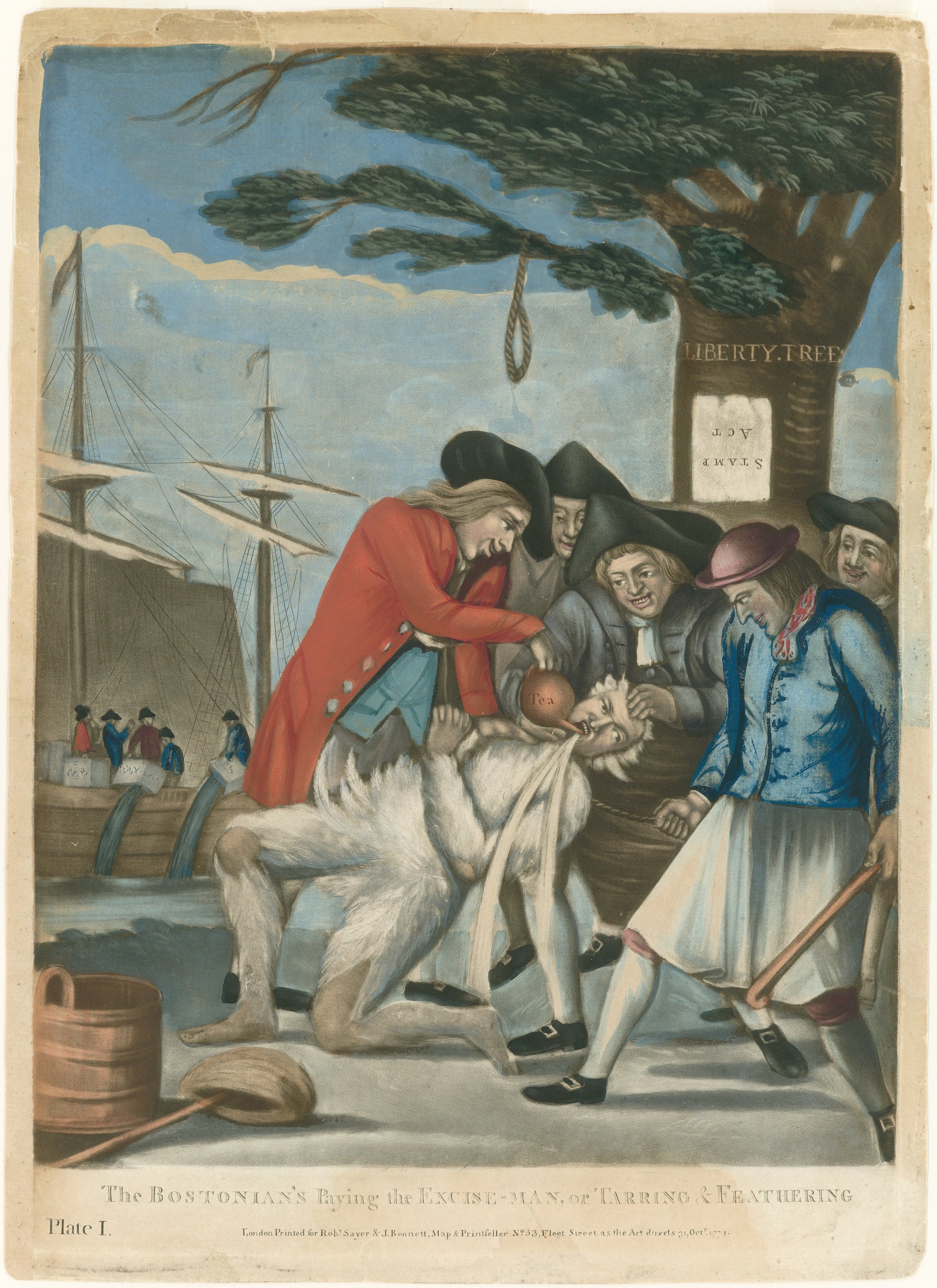
A Loyalist customs official tarred and feathered by the Sons of Liberty, during the American Revolutionary War.

Although with much less diffusion, some social movements of the European Late Middle Ages have also received the name of bourgeois revolution, in which the bourgeoisie begins to define itself in the nascent cities as a social class. Examples include the Ciompi Revolt in the Republic of Florence, Jacquerie revolts during the Hundred Years' War in France, and Bourgeois revolts of Sahagún in Spain. Marxist historian Per Nyström characterised the Engelbrekt rebellion that occurred in the 15th century in Sweden as a bourgeois revolution.

=== Bourgeois revolutions in the early modern period ===
The first wave of bourgeois revolutions are those that occurred within the early modern period and were typically marked by being driven from below by the petty bourgeoisie against absolutist governments.

- German Peasants' War (1524–1525); also labelled by later historians as an early attempt at a bourgeois revolution. (Note: Engels analysed it as a "forerunner" of successful bourgeois revolutions, as an "early bourgeois revolution", yet, the absence of mature bourgeoisie and a national state led to its failure and a revert of Germany to feudalism.)
- (Dutch Republic) Eighty Years' War (1566–1648); also known as the Dutch Revolution. (Note: Marx and Engels considered it to be the second "early bourgeois revolution", this time successful, although they never called it that explicitly. There have been debates within historians whether the Dutch economy was pre-capitalist (argued by 'Political Marxism' authors) or an example of merchant capitalism.)
- (England) English Revolution (1640–1660)
- (United States) American Revolution (1765–1783)
- (France) French Revolution (1789–1799)
- Irish Rebellion of 1798
- Haitian Revolution (1791–1804) (Note: The definition of the Haitian Revolution, a slave uprising against a colonial rule which led to an establishment of an independent nation-state, as a bourgois-democratic revolution, was set forth most explicitly by the historian Eugene Genovese. According to him, the slave revolt, at first dominated by restorationist sentiments, was influenced by the universalist Enlightenment ideology and the French Revolution and became incorporated in the bourgeois revolutionary democratic wave, with the revolutionaries becoming committed to bourgeois-democratic slogans and to the bourgeois property relations, and produced the corresponding outcomes. Later historians complicated the analysis by writing that the event itself also challenged the Enlightenment ideas and was redefining them. Such definition, however, is debated; most explicitly, it is rebutted by postcolonial studies and postmodernist authors who insist that the usage of the "European" category of bourgeois revolutions is inappropriate to 'slave resistance', that such universalist categories obscure the factor of race, and that "restorationist" elements of the revolution couldn't be distinguished from the "revolutionary" ones.)

=== Bourgeois revolutions in the late modern period ===
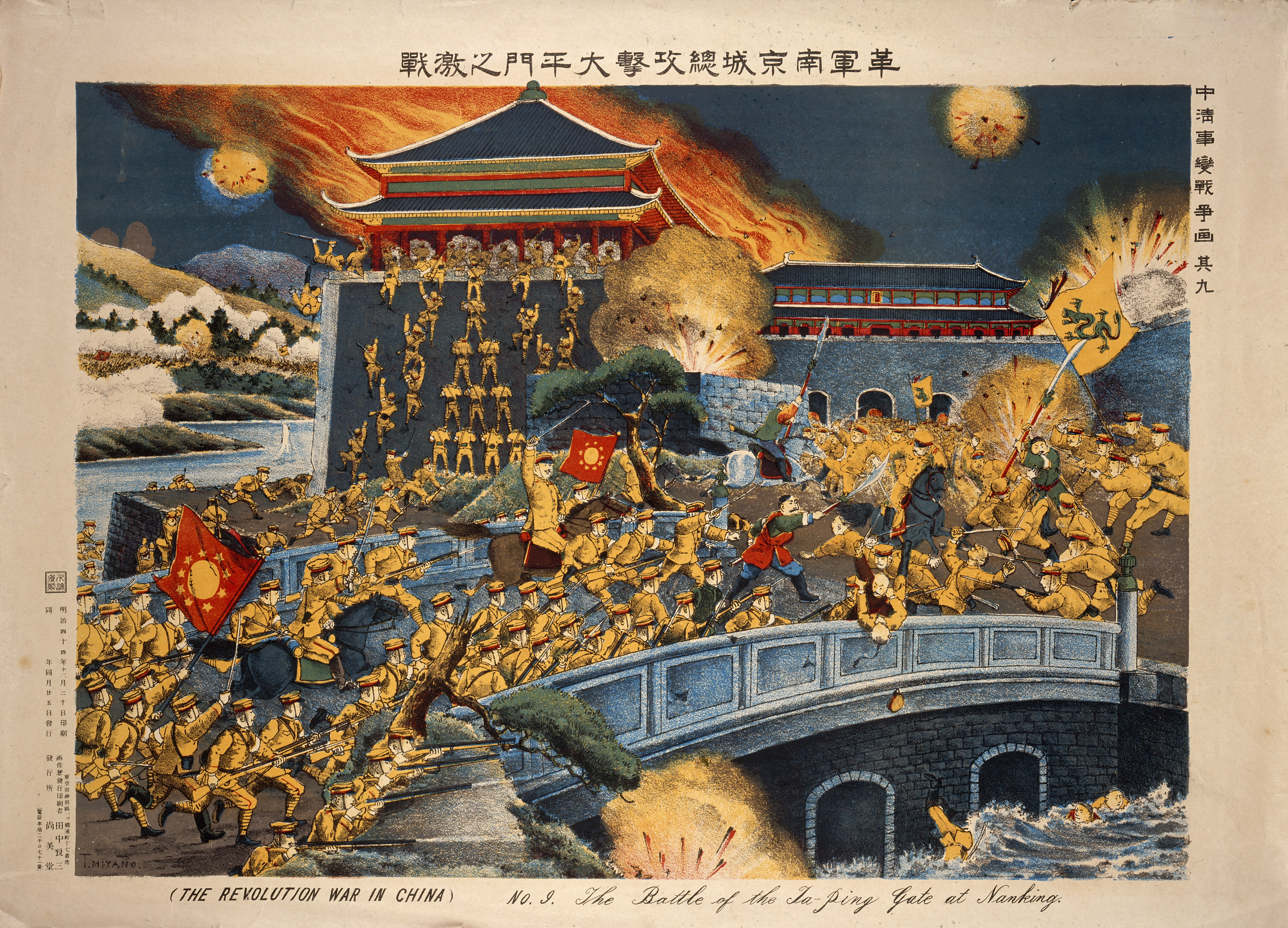
1911 battle at Ta-ping gate, Nanking, during the 1911 Revolution in a painting by T. Miyano

The second wave of bourgeois revolutions are those that occurred within the late modern period and were typically marked by being led from above by the haute bourgeoisie.

- (Gran Colombia) Bolivarian War of Independence (1809–1825)
- Greek Revolution (1821–1829)
- (Wallachia) Wallachian revolution (1821)
- (France) July Revolution (1830)
- Revolutions of 1848
  - (France) February Revolution (1848)
  - German revolutions of 1848–1849
  - Revolutions of 1848 in the Italian states
  - (Hungary) Hungarian Revolution of 1848
  - (Moldavia) Moldavian Revolution of 1848
  - (Wallachia) Wallachian Revolution of 1848
- Risorgimento (1848–1871)
- (North German Confederation) Unification of Germany (1866–1871)
- (United States) American Civil War (1861–1865)
- (Imperial Court in Kyoto) Japanese Revolution (1868–1869)
- (Philippines) Philippine Revolution (1896–1898)
- (Russia) 1905 Russian Revolution (1905–1907)
- (Qajar Iran) Persian Constitutional Revolution (1905–1911)
- (Ottoman Empire) Young Turk Revolution (1908)
- (China) Chinese revolution of 1911 (1911–1912)
- (Mexico) Mexican Revolution (1910–1917)
- (Russia) February Revolution (1917); also called a "bourgeois-democratic revolution" in Soviet historiography
- (Russia) October Revolution (1917)
- / Chinese revolution (1925–1953)

=== Bourgeois revolutions in the contemporary period ===
The leader of Albania and communist political theorist, Enver Hoxha, writing in 1984 described the then recent Iranian Revolution (1978–1979) as a bourgeois revolution.

The category of bourgeois-democratic revolution have been discussed in regards to the Revolutions of 1989 which led to the sociopolitical transition of the Soviet-led Eastern Bloc state socialist states to private capitalism and liberal democratic order. Authors have used more particular attributes, like "bourgeois revolution without bourgeoisie" and "epigonic bourgeois revolution". The latter term is used by the Polish economist Tadeusz Kowalik. He quotes Oskar Lange that the Revolutions of 1917-1923 were processes of the workers' movements and parties creating bourgeois democratic states, and compares them to 1989. He notes that, for example, in Poland, the main revolutionary actor was the workers' trade union Solidarity. The workers of the state socialist Poland, however, were allied with liberal intelligentsia, the Church, and international financial organisations; in the end, their efforts were channelled into a peaceful transition to the "bourgeois class state". The political victory of the workers thus was their defeat, since the outcome for the workers was "one of the most unjust social systems of the second half of the 20th century."
