= China Miéville =

English author and critic (born 1972)

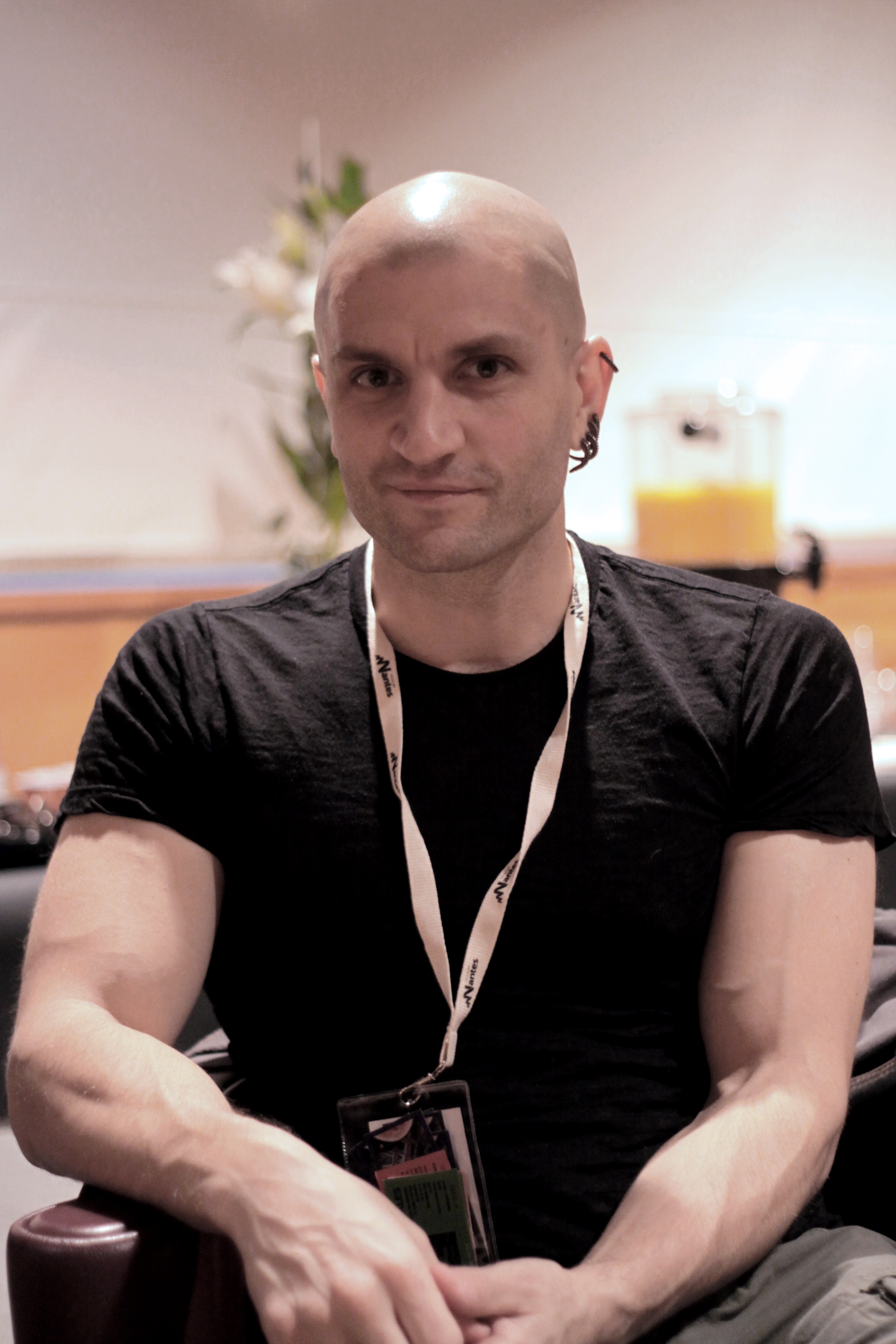
- Miéville at Utopiales (2010)
- Born: China Tom Miéville; 6 September 1972 (age 54); Norwich, Norfolk, England
- Education: Clare College, Cambridge (BA); London School of Economics (PhD)
- Occupations: Short-story writer, novelist, essayist and comic book author
- Writing career
- Period: 1998–present
- Genres: Urban fantasy; Weird fiction; Steampunk
- Notable works: Perdido Street Station (2000); The City & the City (2009); October: The Story of the Russian Revolution (2017)
- Movement: New Weird
- Website: chinamieville.net

China Tom Miéville (/miˈeɪvəl/ mee-AY-vəl, born 6 September 1972) is a British speculative fiction writer and literary critic. He often describes his work as "weird fiction", and is allied to the loosely associated movement of writers called New Weird.

Miéville has won multiple awards for his fiction, including the Arthur C. Clarke Award, British Fantasy Award, BSFA Award, Hugo Award, Locus Award, and World Fantasy Awards. He holds the record for the most Arthur C. Clarke Award wins (three). His novel Perdido Street Station was ranked by Locus as the 6th best fantasy novel published in the 20th century. During 2012–13, he was writer-in-residence at Roosevelt University in Chicago. He became a Fellow of the Royal Society of Literature in 2015.

Miéville is active in left politics in the UK and has previously been a member of the International Socialist Organization (US) and the short-lived International Socialist Network (UK). He was formerly a member of the Socialist Workers Party, and in 2013 became a founding member of Left Unity. He stood for Regent's Park and Kensington North for the Socialist Alliance in the 2001 United Kingdom general election, gaining 1.2% of votes cast.

== Early life and education ==
Miéville was born in Norwich and brought up in Willesden, and has lived in London since early childhood. Miéville's parents separated soon after his birth, and he has said that he "never really knew" his father. He grew up with his sister Jemima and mother Claudia. His mother was a translator, writer and teacher, and the daughter of Leo Claude Vaux Miéville, whose wife Youla (née Harrison) was granddaughter of Edward Littleton, 4th Baron Hatherton. His parents chose his first name, China, from a dictionary, looking for a beautiful name. By virtue of his mother's nationality, Miéville holds US citizenship in addition to British citizenship. In 1982 his mother married Paul Lightfoot, a maternal descendant of George Charles Mostyn, 6th Baron Vaux of Harrowden; they divorced in 1992.

Miéville boarded at Oakham School, a co-educational independent school in Oakham, Rutland, for two years. He subsequently attended University College School. At the age of eighteen, in 1990, he taught English for a year in Egypt, where he developed an interest in Arab culture and in Middle Eastern politics. Miéville studied for a BA degree in social anthropology at Clare College, Cambridge, graduating in 1994, and gained both a master's degree and PhD in international law from the London School of Economics in 2001. Miéville has also held a Frank Knox fellowship at Harvard University. After becoming dissatisfied with the ability of post-modern theories to explain history and political events, he became a Marxist at university. A book version of his PhD thesis, entitled Between Equal Rights: A Marxist Theory of International Law, was published in the UK in 2005 by Brill in their "Historical Materialism" series, and in the United States in 2006 by Haymarket Books.

== Literary influences ==
Miéville's works all describe fantastical or supernatural worlds or scenarios. Miéville has said he plans to write a novel in every genre. To this end, he has "constructed an oeuvre" that ranges from classic American Western (in Iron Council) to sea-quest (in The Scar and Railsea) to detective noir (in The City & the City). His work has been described as new weird fiction.

Miéville has listed M. John Harrison, Michael de Larrabeiti, Michael Moorcock, Thomas M. Disch, Charles Williams, Tim Powers, and J. G. Ballard as literary "heroes"; he has also frequently discussed as influences H. P. Lovecraft, Mervyn Peake, Ursula K. Le Guin, and Gene Wolfe. He has said that he would like his novels "to be read for [his imagined city] New Crobuzon as Iain Sinclair does for London". Miéville has admitted that his books contain some allusions to Russian writers, including Andrei Platonov, Arkady and Boris Strugatsky, Evgeny Voiskunsky and Isai Lukodyanov.

Miéville played a great deal of Dungeons & Dragons and similar roleplaying games (RPGs) in his youth. He has attributed his tendency to systematisation of magic and theology to this influence. In his novel Perdido Street Station, he refers to characters interested "only in gold and experience". The February 2007 issue of Dragon magazine interpreted the world presented in his books according to Dungeons & Dragons rules. The Player's Handbook for the fifth edition of Dungeons & Dragons cited his novel Perdido Street Station as a source of inspiration for the game's designers.

In 2010, Miéville made his first foray into writing for RPGs with a contribution to the Pathfinder Roleplaying Game supplement Guide to the River Kingdoms.

Miéville once described Tolkien as "the wen on the arse of fantasy literature". Miéville is also indebted to Moorcock, having cited his essay "Epic Pooh" as the source upon which he is "riffing" or even simply "cheerleading" in his critique of Tolkien-imitative fantasy. Despite his criticisms, Miéville has praised Tolkien for his contributions to fantasy, especially in a 2009 blog post where he gave five reasons why Tolkien was praiseworthy.

He has cited Michael de Larrabeiti's Borrible Trilogy as one of his biggest influences, and he wrote an introduction for the trilogy's 2002 reissue (the introduction was eventually left out of the book, but appears on de Larrabeiti's website).

== Politics ==
Miéville has previously been a member of the International Socialist Organization (US) and, until 13 March 2013, was also a member of the Socialist Workers Party (SWP, UK). He stood unsuccessfully for the House of Commons of the United Kingdom in the 2001 general election as a candidate for the Socialist Alliance, gaining 459 votes, equivalent to 1.2%, in Regent's Park and Kensington North, a Labour constituency.

In January 2013, he emerged as a critic of the SWP's leadership and in March resigned over the leadership's handling of rape allegations against a leading SWP member.

In August 2013, Miéville was one of nine signatories (along with veteran film-maker and socialist Ken Loach, academic Gilbert Achcar, General Secretary of the Campaign for Nuclear Disarmament Kate Hudson, fellow novelist Michael Rosen, and actor Roger Lloyd Pack) of an open letter to The Guardian announcing the foundation of a "new party of the left", to be called Left Unity. The letter, which claimed that Labour policies on austerity and the breaking of ties with trades unions amounted to a "final betrayal of the working-class people it was founded to represent", stated that Left Unity would be launched at a "founding conference" in London on 30 November 2013 and would provide, as an "alternative" to Labour, "a party that is socialist, environmentalist, feminist and opposed to all forms of discrimination".

In 2014, together with Richard Seymour and others, Miéville quit the International Socialist Network, a Left Unity faction, over a dispute concerning the acceptability of sexual "race play" that was prompted by discussion of a controversial art piece owned by Dasha Zhukova.

In 2015, he was announced as one of the founding editors of a "bi-annual journal of revolutionary arts and letters", Salvage. He has been the director of Salvage Publications since 2014.

October, published in 2017, documents the dramatic events of the Russian revolution. Jonathan Steele reviewed it for The Guardian. Steele considers it an ideological though nuanced retelling: "Known as a left-wing activist, [...] Miéville writes with the brio and excitement of an enthusiast who would have wanted the revolution to succeed. But he is primarily interested in the dramatic narrative – the weird facts – of the most turbulent year in Russia's history".

In a letter to Joybrato Mukherjee on 22 April 2024, Miéville rejected his nomination for a DAAD fellowship, citing Mukherjee's role in the cancelling of Jewish-American political theorist Nancy Fraser's Albertus Magnus Professorship at the University of Cologne because Fraser signed a pro-Palestine letter during the Gaza war, and his lack of "faith that the institution will stand against such a shameful program of repression and anti-Palestinian racism."

== Personal life ==
In the early 2000s, Miéville lived in London with his partner Emma Bircham. They were both cast as extras in the 1999 film Notting Hill, which he jokingly described as a dystopian alternate history of an ethnically cleansed city.

In 2013, Miéville denied allegations of emotional abuse made by an ex-girlfriend. He acknowledged having had a brief affair with the woman, but stated that her account of it was untrue. According to Miéville, he was in a non-monogamous relationship at the time, about which she was aware.

Since 2018, he has taken steps to defend his privacy, following what he described as a campaign of harassment and online defamation.

Miéville is married to artist Season Butler.

== Writings ==
Bookbits radio talks about Embassytown
China Miéville on Bookbits radio talks about Embassytown

A comprehensive list of Miéville's work is available at the Internet Speculative Fiction Database.

=== Fiction ===
==== Bas-Lag series ====
- Perdido Street Station (2000)
- The Scar (2002)
- Iron Council (2004)

==== Stand-alone novels ====
- King Rat (1998) ISBN 978-0312890735
- Un Lun Dun (2007) ISBN 978-0230015869
- The City & the City (2009) ISBN 978-1405000178
- Kraken (2010) ISBN 978-0333989500
- Embassytown (2011) ISBN 978-0230750760
- Railsea (2012) ISBN 978-0230765108
- The Book of Elsewhere (2024), with Keanu Reeves
- The Rouse (2026) ISBN 978-1509847396

==== Novellas ====
- The Tain (2002)
- This Census-Taker (2016)
- The Last Days of New Paris (2016) ISBN 978-0345543998

==== Short story collections ====
- Looking for Jake (2005)
- Three Moments of an Explosion: Stories (2015)

==== Children's picture books ====
- The Worst Breakfast (2016), co-written and illustrated by Zak Smith

==== Comic books ====
- Hellblazer (1988 series) – #250 "Holiday Special": "Snow Had Fallen" (Feb. 2009)
- Justice League (2011 series) – #23.3 "Dial E #1: Dial Q for Qued" (Nov. 2013)
- Dial H (2012–2013 series) – #1-#15

==== Other ====
- Pathfinder Chronicles: Guide to the River Kingdoms (2010), with Elaine Cunningham, Chris Pramas, and Steve Kenson. Paizo Publishing.

==== In an anthology ====
- "Watching God" (first publ. in Three Moments of an Explosion, 2015), in Out of the Ruins, edited by Preston Grassmann, Titan Books, 2021 ISBN 978-1789097399

=== Nonfiction ===
==== Books ====
- Between Equal Rights: A Marxist Theory of International Law (2005). Leiden: Brill. ISBN 1-931859-33-7
- Red Planets: Marxism and Science Fiction (2009), with Mark Bould. Middletown, Conn.: Wesleyan University Press.
- October: The Story of the Russian Revolution (2017). Verso.
- A Spectre, Haunting: On the Communist Manifesto (2022). Head of Zeus. ISBN 1786692031

==== Essays ====
- "London's Overthrow" (2011). Reprinted in a shorter version as "Oh, London, You Drama Queen", The New York Times Magazine 2012-03-01: 42.
- "Preface to a Book not yet Written nor Disavowed" (2015). China Miéville: Critical Essays, eds. Caroline Edwards and Tony Venezia.

== Adaptations ==
- In 2006 Miéville's short story "Details" (collected in Looking for Jake) was adapted as a screenplay by Dan Kay, and subsequently picked up by the studio Paramount Vantage.
- In February 2013, a stage adaptation of The City and the City, written by Christopher M. Walsh and directed by Dorothy Milne, made its world premiere at Lifeline Theatre in Chicago, Illinois. Miéville attended 16 March 2013 production of the adaptation.
- A television adaptation of the novel The City & the City was broadcast on BBC 2 in 2018.
- American artist Mariam Ghani's The City & The City (2015) is a loose adaptation of the novel The City & the City as a video artwork which "maps the conceptual framework of that novel onto the cityscape of St. Louis, melding some of the fictions of the novel's world with elements drawn from past and present histories of the city."
- The short story "Estate" (collected in Three Moments of an Explosion: Stories) was adapted into a 25-minute movie, released on August 14, 2020, that was described by a review in SciFiNow as "a 25 minute blast of striking imagery, earnest performances and intriguing themes."

== Honours ==
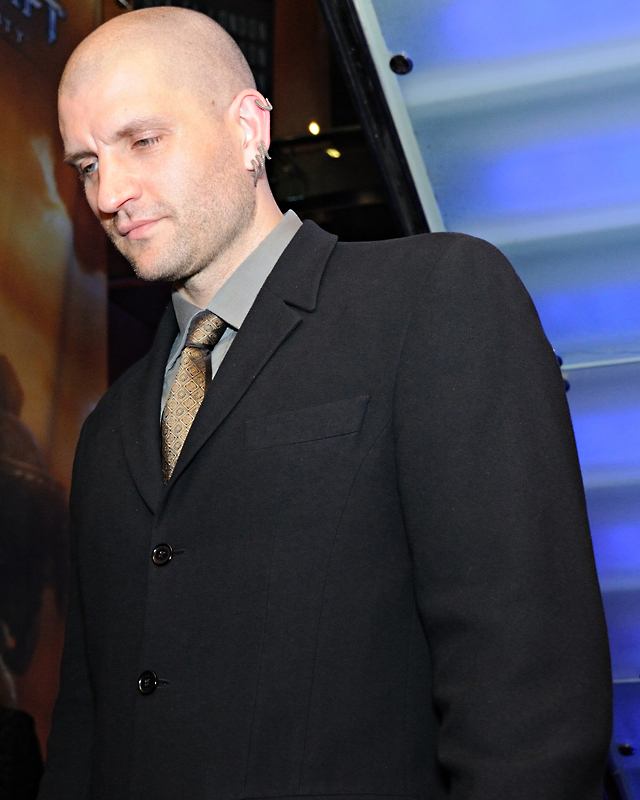
Miéville just after winning the Arthur C. Clarke Award in 2010

Miéville has won numerous accolades in speculative fiction; he holds the record for the most Arthur C Clarke Award wins (three). Perdido Street Station was featured in Locus's poll of all-time best 20th century fantasy novels, where it ranked 6th place.

Mieville’s The Rouse won the 2026 Goldsmiths Prize, and in his victory speech pledged the full £10,000 prize money to the Goldsmiths UCU hardship fund, citing the union members “fight for the kind of university we deserve”.

Year	Title	Award	Category	Result	Ref.
1999	King Rat	Bram Stoker Award	First Novel	Nominated	
1999	King Rat	International Horror Guild Award	First Novel	Nominated	
2000	Perdido Street Station	British Science Fiction Association Award	Best Novel	Nominated	
2001	Perdido Street Station	Arthur C. Clarke Award	-	Won	
2001	Perdido Street Station	British Fantasy Award	Best Novel	Won	
2001	Perdido Street Station	Locus Award	Best Fantasy Novel	Nominated; 4th place	
2001	Perdido Street Station	World Fantasy Award	Novel	Nominated	
2002	Perdido Street Station	Hugo Award	Best Novel	Nominated	
2002	Perdido Street Station	Nebula Award	Best Novel	Nominated	
2002	Perdido Street Station	Premio Ignotus	Foreign Novel	Won	
2002	The Scar	British Science Fiction Association Award	Best Novel	Nominated	
2003	Perdido Street Station	Kurd Laßwitz Award	Foreign Work	Won	
2003	The Scar	Arthur C. Clarke Award	-	Nominated	
2003	The Scar	British Fantasy Award	Best Novel	Won	
2003	The Scar	Hugo Award	Best Novel	Nominated	
2003	The Scar	Locus Award	Best Fantasy Novel	Won	
2003	The Scar	World Fantasy Award	Novel	Nominated	
2003	The Scar	Philip K. Dick Award	-	Special Citation	
2004	King Rat	Kurd Laßwitz Award	Foreign Work	Nominated	
2005	"Reports of Certain Events in London"	World Fantasy Award	Short Fiction	Nominated	
2005	"Reports of Certain Events in London"	Locus Award	Best Novelette	Won	
2005	Perdido Street Station	Grand prix de l'Imaginaire	Foreign-language novel	Won	
2005	The Scar	Kurd Laßwitz Award	Foreign Work	Won	
2005	Iron Council	Arthur C. Clarke Award	-	Won	
2005	Iron Council	Hugo Award	Best Novel	Nominated	
2005	Iron Council	Locus Award	Best Fantasy Novel	Won	
2005	Iron Council	World Fantasy Award	Novel	Nominated	
2006	Iron Council	Kurd Laßwitz Award	Foreign Work	Won	
2008	Un Lun Dun	Locus Award	Best Young Adult Book	Won	
2009	The City & the City	British Science Fiction Association Award	Best Novel	Nominated	
2009	The City & the City	Nebula Award	Best Novel	Nominated	
2009	The City & the City	Kitschies	Red Tentacle	Won	
2010	The City & the City	Arthur C. Clarke Award	-	Won	
2010	The City & the City	Hugo Award	Best Novel	Won	
2010	The City & the City	Locus Award	Best Fantasy Novel	Won	
2010	The City & the City	World Fantasy Award	Novel	Won	
2010	Kraken	Kitschies	Red Tentacle	Nominated	
2011	The City & the City	Kurd Laßwitz Award	Foreign Work	Won	
2011	Kraken	Locus Award	Best Fantasy Novel	Won	
2011	Embassytown	Kitschies	Red Tentacle	Nominated	
2011	Embassytown	British Science Fiction Association Award	Best Novel	Nominated	
2012	Embassytown	Arthur C. Clarke Award	-	Nominated	
2012	Embassytown	Hugo Award	Best Novel	Nominated	
2012	Embassytown	Locus Award	Best Science Fiction Novel	Won	
2012	Embassytown	Nebula Award	Best Novel	Nominated	
2012	The City & the City	Grand prix de l'Imaginaire	Foreign-language novel	Won	
2013	The City & the City	Premio Ignotus	Foreign Novel	Won	
2013	Railsea	British Fantasy Award	Best Fantasy Novel	Nominated	
2013	Railsea	Locus Award	Best Young Adult Book	Won	
2013	Embassytown	Kurd Laßwitz Award	Foreign Work	Nominated	
2014	Embassytown	Premio Ignotus	Foreign Novel	Won	
2016	Railsea	Kurd Laßwitz Award	Foreign Novel	Nominated	
2026	The Rouse	Goldsmiths Prize	-	Won	

- Miéville has been a Guest of Honour at multiple science fiction conventions, including Orbital 2008 the British National Science Fiction convention (Eastercon) in London and Readercon 2006.
- He was a 2018 Guggenheim Fellow in Fiction.
