= Looking for Jake =

2005 collection of stories by China Miéville

- First UK edition
- Author: China Miéville
- Illustrator: Liam Sharp (one story)
- Cover artist: Irina Porter
- Language: English
- Genre: Science Fiction, Fantasy, Horror
- Publisher: Macmillan (UK); Del Rey Books (US)
- Publication date: 2005
- Media type: Print (hardcover)
- Pages: 303 pp
- ISBN: 1-4050-4830-1 (UK h/b); ISBN 1-4050-5232-5 (UK p/b); ISBN 0-345-47607-7 (US)
- OCLC: 58457286
- Dewey Decimal: 823/.914 22
- LC Class: PR6063.I265 L66 2005

Looking for Jake and Other Stories is a collection of science fiction, horror and fantasy stories by British author China Miéville. It was first published by Del Rey Books and Macmillan in 2005.

== Stories ==
The book contains eleven short stories, a novella (The Tain), a novelette ("Reports of Certain Events in London"), and a comic book-esque tale ("On the Way to the Front"), which was illustrated by British comic book artist Liam Sharp. Eleven of the stories were originally published between 1998 and 2004, and the remaining four ("The Ball Room", "Go Between", "Jack", "On the Way to the Front") had never been published before. The short story, "The Ball Room" was co-written by Miéville, Emma Bircham and Max Schaefer, and the novella, The Tain, was published as a free standing book in 2002.

All of the stories are set in London, with the exceptions of "Jack", set in Miéville's created world Bas-Lag, and "Foundation", the setting of which is not specified. The stories are as follows:

| Story | First published | Description |
|---|---|---|
| "Looking for Jake" | 1998 | Written in the style of a letter, from the unnamed narrator to the mysterious Jake P (with whom the narrator has some vaguely described relationship or friendship), this story chronicles what is described as a "breakdown" of London, in which a large portion of the population suddenly disappears and supernatural occurrences affect the remaining population – including the appearance of strange predatory creatures. |
| "Foundation" | 2003 | This is a story about a man who is haunted by past war-time atrocities in which he had a small part. Working now as a building inspector, he sees and hears the dead continuously in the foundations of buildings – countless mutilated bodies stacked together like bricks and mortar – and tries desperately to appease them so he will be left alone. |
| "The Ball Room" | (original to this collection) | This, the most straightforward horror story in the collection, is a classically crafted ghost story, relocated to a modern setting. It is narrated by a security guard working at an IKEA-like furniture store, who tells of events surrounding the store's play area, which features a ball pit with an insidiously creepy secret. This story was co-written with Emma Bircham and Max Schaefer. |
| "Reports of Certain Events in London" | 2004 | This short story, in the form of a collection of fictional documents supposedly "received" by the author, presents the idea that there exist certain autonomous streets which phase in and out of existence, living complex and mysterious lives of their own, and even having romances and violent feuds amongst their alley selves. The street that is the focus of the story (Varmin Way) is also mentioned in Un Lun Dun briefly. |
| "Familiar" | 2002 | This story begins with an urban witch who has regretfully conjured a hideous familiar from his own body. After the witch attempts to dispose of the creature in a canal the familiar begins to explore London on its own, developing into something more dangerous and powerful than its creator had imagined. |
| "Entry Taken from a Medical Encyclopaedia" | 2003 | This story was original published as "Buscard's Murrain" in The Thackery T. Lambshead Pocket Guide to Eccentric & Discredited Diseases. Taking, as the title suggests, the form of an encyclopaedic entry on a disease, the story describes a strange disease known as Buscard's Murrain (also, "Wormword"). The disease is contracted entirely via uttering of a certain word (which the story gives but never reveals its proper pronunciation). The disease causes insanity and the need to repeat the word over and over to large crowds. This sometimes causes spectators to repeat the word and thus become infected themselves. |
| "Details" | 2002 | A boy, charged with caring for a mysterious old woman, discovers that strange and frightening forces live hidden in the lines, cracks and creases of our world. This tale also appeared in The Children of Cthulhu: Chilling New Tales Inspired by H.P. Lovecraft (edited by John Pelan and Benjamin Adams) and New Cthulhu: The Recent Weird (edited by Paula Guran) . |
| "Go Between" | (original to this collection) | A man begins receiving anonymous instructions to courier seemingly unimportant items from location to location. Intrigued, he follows the instructions, but soon starts to agonise over whether his actions (or inactions) have any consequences in the real world. |
| "Different Skies" | 1999 | Written as a series of diary entries by an elderly man who buys a strange, coloured window pane and installs it in his study, only to realise that the old glass looks out upon a different version of London, where a gang of children have decided to torment him with increasing viciousness. |
| "An End to Hunger" | 2000 | A man relates the story of how he became friends with an enigmatic computer hacker named Aykan, who wages a virtual war against the website of a charity called An End To Hunger, which seems to fight back using unexpected means. |
| "'Tis the Season" | 2004 | Originally written for the Socialist Review, this humorous and political story takes place in a somewhat dystopian London in which holidays, including Christmas, have been privatised and certain holiday phrases are copyrighted. Only the rich can afford to celebrate "Christmas™", and the masses are made to choose between cheaper imitations such as XmasTym, JingleMas or Coca-Crissmas. |
| "Jack" | (original to this collection) | This is the only story of the collection set in New Crobuzon, a city in Mieville's created world Bas-Lag and the setting of Perdido Street Station and Iron Council. It takes place after the capture of the infamous New Crobuzon criminal/terrorist, Jack Half-a-Prayer, and is narrated by one of his former associates. |
| "On the Way to the Front" | (original to this collection) | This is a graphic story illustrated by Liam Sharp, which features only sparse descriptive text and dialogue. It tells the story of a London man witnessing spectres of soldiers from multiple wars, and his frustration at being stuck "on the way to the front" while the soldiers, as well as other people, are "passing through". |
| The Tain | 2002 | This is a novella set in a post-apocalyptic version of London where the fauna of mirrors have rebelled against their imprisonment. It was originally published in 2002 as a limited edition book by PS Publishing. |

== Adaptations ==
In 2006 it was announced that the story Details was turned into a script by Dan Kay, and subsequently picked up by studio Paramount Vantage. The script was said to expand upon the original story's exploration of pareidolia and rework the plot to feature a father and daughter. As of November 2008, Martyrs director Pascal Laugier is attached to direct.
