= The City and the City (TV series) =

British television series

- Genre: Science fiction Crime drama
- Based on: The City & the City by China Miéville
- Written by: Tony Grisoni
- Directed by: Tom Shankland
- Starring: David Morrissey
- Composer: Dominik Scherrer
- Country of origin: United Kingdom
- Original language: English
- No. of series: 1
- No. of episodes: 4

Production
- Executive producers: Tony Grisoni; Preethi Mavahalli; Lucy Richer; Tom Shankland; Robyn Slovo; Joanna Thapa; Damien Timmer
- Producer: Betsan Morris Evans
- Camera setup: Single-camera
- Running time: 56 minutes
- Production company: Mammoth Screen

Original release
- Network: BBC Two
- Release: 6 April – 27 April 2018

The City and the City is a British four-part television serial, first screened in April 2018. It is a science-fiction/crime drama, based on the novel of the same name by China Miéville. The story follows the investigation of a young woman's murder in the unusual twin cities of Besźel and Ul Qoma. The miniseries was produced by Mammoth Screen for BBC Two, scripted by Tony Grisoni and directed by Tom Shankland.

== Setting ==
The setting (the science fiction aspect of the production) is the twin cities of Besźel and Ul Qoma, fictional city-states somewhere in eastern Europe. The two cities have differing societies, cultures, technologies and language, yet co-exist in the same geographical space. The separation is achieved by the residents of each city "unseeing" the other, while being aware of it, and the separation is enforced by a shadowy organisation called Breach. While crossing the border is possible (after a lengthy re-orientation process), those who "breach" the separation illegally are taken by Breach and disappear forever.

== Synopsis ==
Tyador Borlú, a detective in Besźel, is given the task of solving the murder of Mahalia Geary. He is assisted by Constable Lizbyet Corwi. After posters of Mahalia are placed around the city, Borlú receives an anonymous tip from a woman in Ul Qoma, despite no posters having been placed there. He determines she must have seen it by illegally looking across the border into Besźel. Corwi acquires a tape containing evidence that the murder was committed in Ul Qoma, and the investigation is transferred to the Ul Qoman police. Borlú travels to there to assist detective Quissima Dhatt.

In a series of flashbacks, Borlú is haunted by memories of his wife Katrynia. They had met on a trip to Ul Qoma, where she had attended a lecture by writer David Bowden, who espouses his theory of the existence of a hidden third city named Orciny. After being turned down by Bowden at a bar, Katrynia attempted suicide by drowning, but was saved by Borlú; she returned to Besźel with him and they married. Katrynia met Bowden again when he took a trip to Besźel, and disappeared that night. Borlú suspects she entered one of the Dissensi, disputed zones belonging to neither of the two cities, in pursuit of Orciny.

In Ul Qoma, Borlú discovers that Mahalia was an archaeology student and admirer of Bowden who worked at a dig site where inexplicable artifacts are being found. Bowden disappears after a mail bomb addressed to him explodes at the dig site, and Borlú realises that people connected to the Orciny theory are being targeted. Meanwhile, Corwi investigates links between Yorj Syedr, a high-profile nationalist politician in Besźel, and American entrepreneur Mike Gorse, who controls a mega corporation dominating the landscape. Borlú tracks down the anonymous woman, her best friend Yolanda, who tipped him off that Mahalia died because she discovered the truth. She went into hiding after her murder. With Dhatt's help, he smuggles Yolanda into Besźel, but she is killed by an armed man who attacks the border checkpoint. Borlú shoots him from Ul Qoma to save Corwi, disrupting the border between the cities and causing both sides to momentarily see one another.

He is captured by Breach, who interrogate him and force him to continue the investigation under their auspices. Corwi reveals that she is a member of Breach tasked with monitoring him. Using Breach's intelligence, they discover that Mahalia stole artifacts from the dig site in Ul Qoma, believing she could gain entry to Orciny by delivering them through the Dissensi. Retracing her steps, Borlú finds an underground chamber built by Mike Gorse where Syedr's men picked up the stolen artifacts. He determines that Mahalia was killed by Bowden when she confronted him about promulgating the lie of Orciny to rope her into the scheme, which she discovered when she followed one of the packages of artifacts she was delivering.

On the night of the mayoral election, won by Syedr, Borlú and Corwi interrogate him. He admits that he conspired with Bowden to smuggle the artifacts to Gorse, who sold them on the black market; in exchange, Gorse funded Syedr's campaign. Syedr also explains that he arranged Yolanda's killing and sent the mail bomb to Bowden. Fearing Breach's wrath, he then commits suicide. When the American corporate magnate Gorse is confronted with his part in the scheme he boasts he really wanted the artifacts to re-engineer the ancient technology of a previously unknown alloy better than any currently available. He then strides off with Breach unable to stop him.

Borlú tracks down Bowden to find out the truth about Katrynia's fate, who tells him that she drowned herself, again trying to get to Orciny. Bowden stabs Borlú in the neck and is shot by Corwi while trying to escape. While haemorrhaging, Borlú sees Katrynia calling for him to join her in the blinding purple light associated with Orciny. He turns away and returns to his body. Does Orciny really exist or is he hallucinating?

In the aftermath, Borlú has become an agent for Breach, and can pass between both cities. At the end of the programme, he narrates "I am Borlú, Breach Manifest. My job is to maintain the skin that keeps law in place. But I once glimpsed another place, and at night I am back there again," and again he sees Katrynia ahead of him, waiting for him, and leading him on.

== Production ==
The City And The City was scripted by Tony Grisoni and directed by Tom Shankland. China Miéville served as consultant. Bringing Miéville's setting to the screen presented the challenge of showing two distinct worlds co-existing, and to let the viewer share its inhabitants' point of view. This was achieved by differentiating the cities through architecture, clothing, décor, colour and lighting. Besźel resembles the old Eastern Europe of the early 1990s, the streets are filled with communist-era cars and most of the more modern technology such as computers consists of secondhand imports, coloured with soft yellows, greens and browns, while Ul Qoma is described on the DVD "making of" documentary as resembling the new Eastern Europe of the oligarchs, and bright red with blue or blue-white dominate. The scenes that reference Orciny use purple.

To let the viewer see this world with the characters' eyes, any view of the other city was blurred out, and pushed to the edge of the screen, in line with the oft-repeated slogan/mantra, "when in Besźel see only Besźel; when in Ul Qoma see only Ul Qoma".

Both cities have a distinctive writing scheme, and scenes in Ul Qoma also feature some dialogue in its language, Illitan, which is sub-titled. Besź is shown as written in English, though with Czech diacritics and some Cyrillic letters, while Illitan was devised for the programme by linguist Dr. Alison Long. For this she produced a vocabulary of some 1800 words, with grammar, spelling and pronunciation rules, and used an alphabet based on Georgian Mkhedruli script.

The series was shot on location in and around Liverpool and Manchester.

== Cast ==
- David Morrissey as Inspector Tyador Borlú
- Mandeep Dhillon as Constable Lizbyet Corwi
- Lara Pulver as Katrynia Perla
- Maria Schrader as Detective Quissima Dhatt
- Christian Camargo as Professor David Bowden
- Ron Cook as Kommissar Gadlem
- Danny Webb as Major Yorj Syedr
- Paprika Steen as Mona Ul Nadi
- Robert Firth as Mike Gorse
- Michael Moshonov as Aikham
- Morfydd Clark as Yolanda Stark
- Corey Johnson as Mr Geary
- Andrea Deck as Mahalia Geary

== Episodes ==
The series was first shown as four one-hour episodes on BBC Two in April 2018.

No.	Title	Directed by	Written by	Original release date	Viewers (millions)
1	"Besźel"	Tom Shankland	Tony Grisoni	6 April 2018	1.56
Borlú investigates the murder of a woman from Ul Qoma, found in neighbouring city Besźel.
2	"Ul Qoma"	Tom Shankland	Tony Grisoni	13 April 2018	N/A
Borlú crosses a border like no other to work with the Ul Qoman Militsya.
3	"Orciny"	Tom Shankland	Tony Grisoni	20 April 2018	N/A
Borlú faces the demons of Katrynia's past as anyone linked to the third city is at risk.
4	"Breach"	Tom Shankland	Tony Grisoni	27 April 2018	N/A
Under the vigilant eyes of Breach, Borlú chases the truth of what lies between the cities.

== Critical response ==
Critical response following the first episode was generally favourable, particularly over the realisation of the two cities; Jeff Robson of the i stated it "looks fantastic" and was "equal parts Blade Runner, 1984, and John le Carré at his most downbeat". Guy Pewsey of the Evening Standard said it was "a clever take on the genre". Adrian Lobb of The Big Issue, in an interview with David Morrissey, describes The City And The City as "a fantastic adaptation of an off-kilter literary marvel" However Ellen Jones of the Guardian was less complimentary, calling it a "flat-footed adaptation".
