= The Rouse (Miéville novel) =

2026 novel by China Miéville

- Cover of the 2026 Pan Macmillan edition
- Author: China Miéville
- Language: English
- Publication date: 2026

The Rouse is a 2026 novel by British author China Miéville.

== Plot ==
The novel revolves around the suicides of multiple British army soldiers. It is set during the Cold War.

== Awards ==
It won the 2026 Goldsmiths Prize.
