= The Last Days of New Paris =

Novella by China Miéville

- Author: China Miéville
- Cover artist: Claudia Carlsen
- Publisher: Del Rey Books
- Publication date: 2016
- ISBN: 978-0345543998

The Last Days of New Paris is a 2016 fantasy novella by British writer China Miéville. The book takes place in an alternate history in which surrealist artists join partisans in Paris to fight Nazi groups. The role of surrealism in history is explored.

== Synopsis ==
The main plot follows Thibaut, a Parisian, in an alternate-history 1950 where World War II is still ongoing and Paris is still occupied by Nazis. He joins forces with Sam, a photographer, to fight the occupying Nazis in a landscape dominated by manifs, real-world manifestations of surrealist art.

Interstitial chapters follow an American engineer and occultist named Jack Parsons, who visits a group of Marseilles surrealists, including André Breton, in 1941. Parsons creates the "S-Bomb", the device which creates the manifs when stolen and detonated in Paris.
