= Embassytown =

2011 novel by China Miéville

- UK first edition cover
- Author: China Miéville
- Language: English
- Genre: Science fiction
- Publisher: Pan Macmillan
- Publication date: 28 April 2011
- Publication place: United Kingdom
- Media type: Print (hardcover)
- Pages: 404
- Awards: Locus Award for Best Science Fiction Novel (2012)
- ISBN: 978-0-2307-5076-0
- OCLC: 769982453

China Miéville on Bookbits radio talks about Embassytown.

Embassytown is a science fiction novel by British author China Miéville. It was published in the UK by Pan Macmillan on 6 May 2011, and in the US by Del Rey Books on 17 May 2011. A limited edition was released by Subterranean Press. The novel's plot involves the town of Embassytown, the native alien residents known as Ariekei, their Language, and humans' interaction with them. The novel was well reviewed and won the 2012 Locus Award for Best Science Fiction Novel.

== Plot ==
Embassytown takes place mostly in the city of the title, on the planet Arieka. Embassytown is a colony of a state called Bremen; and its trade goods (precious metal and alien-influenced biotech), along with Embassytown's unique position at the edge of the known universe, make it a notable colony.

Avice Benner Cho, an "Immerser" (a traveller on the Immer, see § Style below for the meaning of Miéville's neologisms), has returned to her childhood home from her adventures in the "Out". On the planet of Arieka humans and other "exots" co-exist with the indigenous, enigmatic Ariekei—otherwise known as the Hosts. Few people can speak the language of the Ariekei (referred to only as "Language"), as it requires the orator to speak two words at once with one mind; those humans who can are genetically engineered twins known as Ambassadors, bred solely for this purpose. The Ambassadors can be understood by the Ariekei (who do not recognise any other form of communication) allowing for trade in their valuable biotechnology. Language does not allow for lying or even speculation, Language reflects both their state of mind and reality as the Ariekei perceive it; they create literal similes by recruiting individuals to perform activities that can then become allusions in Language. Avice herself became a simile when younger, "the girl who was hurt in the dark and ate what was given to her". Ariekei compete at Festivals of Lies to see who can most closely approximate speaking an untruth, an act both thrilling and highly taboo.

The relationship between humans and Ariekei has proceeded in relative tranquillity for many years. However a new Ambassador arrives, named Ez/Ra, who despite not being twins, is able to speak Language. The speech of the new Bremen-engineered Ambassador, regardless of words spoken, intoxicates any Ariekei exposed to it, and they become addicted to the extent that they cannot live without it.

A faction of the Ariekei deafen themselves to break their addiction and begin to violently convert others, developing increasingly sophisticated gesture-based communication. Avice is drawn into a search for a solution, having a special relationship with the Ariekei as a human simile. With assistance from sympathetic Ambassadors, she trains a small group of Hosts to be able to use metaphors and eventually utter lies. Due to the interconnectedness of thought and Language, this has the effect of altering their minds and now the words of Ez/Ra lose their addictive properties. The two Ariekei factions reconcile; freed from the literal nature of Language, they are able to learn new forms of communication, which also allows them to speak to non-Ambassador humans.

== Style ==
Often described as a book about language, Embassytown also employs fictional language, or neologisms, as a means of building its world. The author Ursula K. Le Guin describes this as follows: "When everything in a story is imaginary and much is unfamiliar, there's far too much to explain and describe, so one of the virtuosities of SF is the invention of box-words that the reader must open to discover a trove of meaning and implication". Their effect on the reader has been described as disorienting, with The Guardian's James Purdon remarking on "a slow accretion of detail and implication until a universe coheres".

Anglo-Ubiq
"Ubiquitous" English; the most widely spoken language on the planet, and a far-future descendant of Terre English. The scholar of English Carl Freedman views this also as a reference to Philip K. Dick's Ubik, which the novel alludes to in other parts of its worldbuilding.
biorigging
Living houses, furniture and organic weapons; a technology proprietary to the Ariekei, and central to their commerce with Bremen. Reminiscent of the setting of Ubik, with Freedman noting that Miéville once wrote a critical essay about Ubik on this theme.
exot or exoterre
Alien, or from outside Terre, the long-lost, mythical home planet of humans. Freedman views the remote, forgotten Earth and uncommonness of space travel as sharing an affinity with Samuel R. Delany's linguistic SF, Stars in My Pocket Like Grains of Sand.
immer and manchmal
Borrowed from German, meaning "always" and "sometimes". The immer is hyperspace (also called warpspace or subspace), while manchmal refers to normal spacetime. The book describes the current manchmal as the "third universe", born after the heat-death of the previous two (each with different laws of physics); the immer, in contrast, is never-changing. Le Guin calls the relationship between the manchmal and immer as akin to the land and the sea, so that "to travel through space is to immerse". Joseph Weakland notes that the immer is associated with nautical language, such as tides, currents and shipwrecks; he describes it as reflecting the "sublime unpredictability and hostility of the sea". It even contains sea monsters that arrive in a "miab". The scholar and critic Gary K. Wolfe compares them to the subspace predators of Cordwainer Smith's The Game of Rat and Dragon. He also highlights Avice's description of the immer: "langue of which our actuality is a parole" [French: language of which our actuality is a word], and interprets the universe as being "a kind of deep-structured grammar", a foreshadowing of the novel’s themes.
miab
Acronym for "message in a bottle". The world of Embassytown does not have faster-than-light communication, but it does have FTL travel, resulting in "miabs" sent through the immer as the means of communication. The presence of sea monsters ("stichlings") makes their reliability a concern; this matches the book's central theme, that of a crisis in communication.
pharos
Greek for "lighthouse". Refers to beacons placed in the immer by an unknown alien entity, to warn immersers against hyperspace hazards. The lighthouse maker is referred to as the "Pharotekton" and worshipped by humans as a deity, as part of the "Church of Christ Uploaded", a form of space-adapted monotheism.
shiftparents
Refers to a family structure with cooperative/group parenting of children.

Another stylistic quirk employed by Miéville is the use of fractions such as Cal/Vin to display alien language, which takes the form of two words spoken simultaneously (by two alien mouths).

== Characters ==
The names in Embassytown which are presented in fractional notation are supposed to be spoken simultaneously, by two mouths.

- Avice Benner Cho – Embassytown native and Immerser, wife to Scile and lover of Cal/Vin
- Scile – non-native linguist and husband to Avice; believes that Language should remain as it is regardless of the consequences
- Cal/Vin – Ambassador of high standing, lover of Avice Benner Cho
- Mag/Da – head Ambassador
- Ez/Ra – new, Bremen-engineered Ambassador consisting of two non-identical people. Becomes known as the "God Drug".
- Bren – ex-Ambassador still living in Embassytown and advisor to Avice, one half of the "cleaved" Ambassador Bren/Dan
- Ehrsul – an "autom" (from automaton), best friend of Avice
- Wyatt – Bremen's contact in Embassytown
- Hasser – a human "simile" used by the Ariekei as part of Language. Killer of Surl/(Tesh-echer).
- Surl/(Tesh-echer) (or Beehive) – the most successful Ariekei liar. Hasser murders it during a Festival of Lies.
- Spanish Dancer – an Ariekei with markings reminiscent of a Spanish dancer. A follower of Surl/(Tesh-echer) with an interest in the similes.
- YlSib (formerly Sib/Yl) – ex-Ambassador living in the Host city; Bren's contact.

== Development ==
The Ariekei have two speaking orifices and utter their language through both simultaneously; for them, language, thought and reality are inseparable, hence they cannot understand the speech of individual humans, tell lies or speculate.

— Kirkus Reviews

Miéville originally had the idea for the Ariekei at age 11, in "an early draft of what became Embassytown", written while he was in school. They next featured in a short story he wrote eight years later, which Miéville intended to get published in Interzone magazine. In attempting to portray an authentically "alien" alien race, Miéville commented that he finds it almost impossible, stating "if you are a writer who happens to be a human, I think it's definitionally beyond your ken to describe something truly inhuman, psychologically, something alien."

=== Publication history ===
- 2011, UK, Pan Macmillan ISBN 978-0-2307-5076-0, pub date 28 April 2011, Hardback
- 2011, USA, Del Rey Books ISBN 978-0-3455-2449-2, pub date 17 May 2011, Hardback
- 2011, USA, Audible, pub date 27 Jun 2011, Audiobook
- 2011, USA, Subterranean Press ISBN 978-1-5960-6410-2, pub date 30 Sep 2011, Signed limited edition hardback
- 2012, UK, Pan Macmillan ISBN 978-0-3305-3307-2, pub date 5 Jan 2012, Paperback
- 2012, USA, Del Rey Books ISBN 978-0-3455-2450-8, pub date 31 Jan 2012, Paperback

== Reception ==
Ursula K. Le Guin, reviewing the book for The Guardian, wrote "Embassytown is a fully achieved work of art...works on every level, providing compulsive narrative, splendid intellectual rigour and risk, moral sophistication, fine verbal fireworks and sideshows, and even the old-fashioned satisfaction of watching a protagonist become more of a person than she gave promise of being". Publishers Weekly said "Miéville's brilliant storytelling shines most when Avice works through problems and solutions that develop from the Hosts' unique and convoluted linguistic evolution, and many of the most intriguing characters are the Hosts themselves. The result is a world masterfully wrecked and rebuilt." The Scotsman stated that "Embassytown features aliens that are genuinely and thrillingly alien" and suggested "a book fundamentally concerned with the role of language as an imaginative liberation. Miéville has taken the theoretical and philosophical insights of thinkers such as Jacques Derrida and Paul Ricoeur and turned them into story. It is not, however, a tract. There is a genuine emotional transaction at the novel's climax."

== Awards ==
Year	Award	Result	Ref.
2012	Arthur C. Clarke Award	Nominated	
2012	BSFA Award	Nominated	
2012	Hugo Award	Nominated	
2012	John W. Campbell Memorial Award	Nominated	
2012	The Kitschies (Red Tentacle)	Nominated	
2012	Locus Award	Won	
2012	Nebula Award	Nominated	
2014	Premio Ignotus	Won	
2014	Seiun Award	Nominated	

== Sources ==
- Freedman, Carl Howard (2015). "Embassytown; Or, Between Language and Language". Art and Idea in the Novels of China Miéville. Gylphi. ISBN 978-1-78024-030-5.
- Le Guin, Ursula K. (2016). "China Miéville: Embassytown". Words Are My Matter: Writings on Life and Books, 2000–2016. Small Beer Press. ISBN 978-1-61873-134-0 – via The Guardian.
- Miéville, China (2011). Embassytown. Pan Macmillan.
- Weakland, Joseph P. (March 2015). "'Forked Tongues': Languages of Estrangement in China Miéville's Embassytown". Science Fiction Studies. 42 (1): 78–98. doi:10.5621/sciefictstud.42.1.0078.
