= International Socialist Network =

Short-lived revolutionary socialist organisation in Britain

The International Socialist Network (ISN or IS Network for short) was a short-lived revolutionary socialist organisation in Britain. It was formed as a split from the Socialist Workers Party in 2013 following the alleged rape scandal concerning former National Secretary, Martin Smith.

According to the group's Autumn 2014 Discussion Bulletin, it was "a tendency within Left Unity". The ISN also participated in unity talks involving other organisations, some of which are involved in Left Unity, including Workers Power, Socialist Resistance, Anti-Capitalist Initiative and Revolutionary Socialism in the 21st Century (RS21). It published regular 'internal' bulletins that are also publicly available, and one issue of a proposed journal, 'Cactus'.

The ISN voted to disband at a national meeting in May 2015 and encouraged members to join other socialist organisations.
