= Nicoletta Vallorani =

Italian science fiction writer (born 1959)

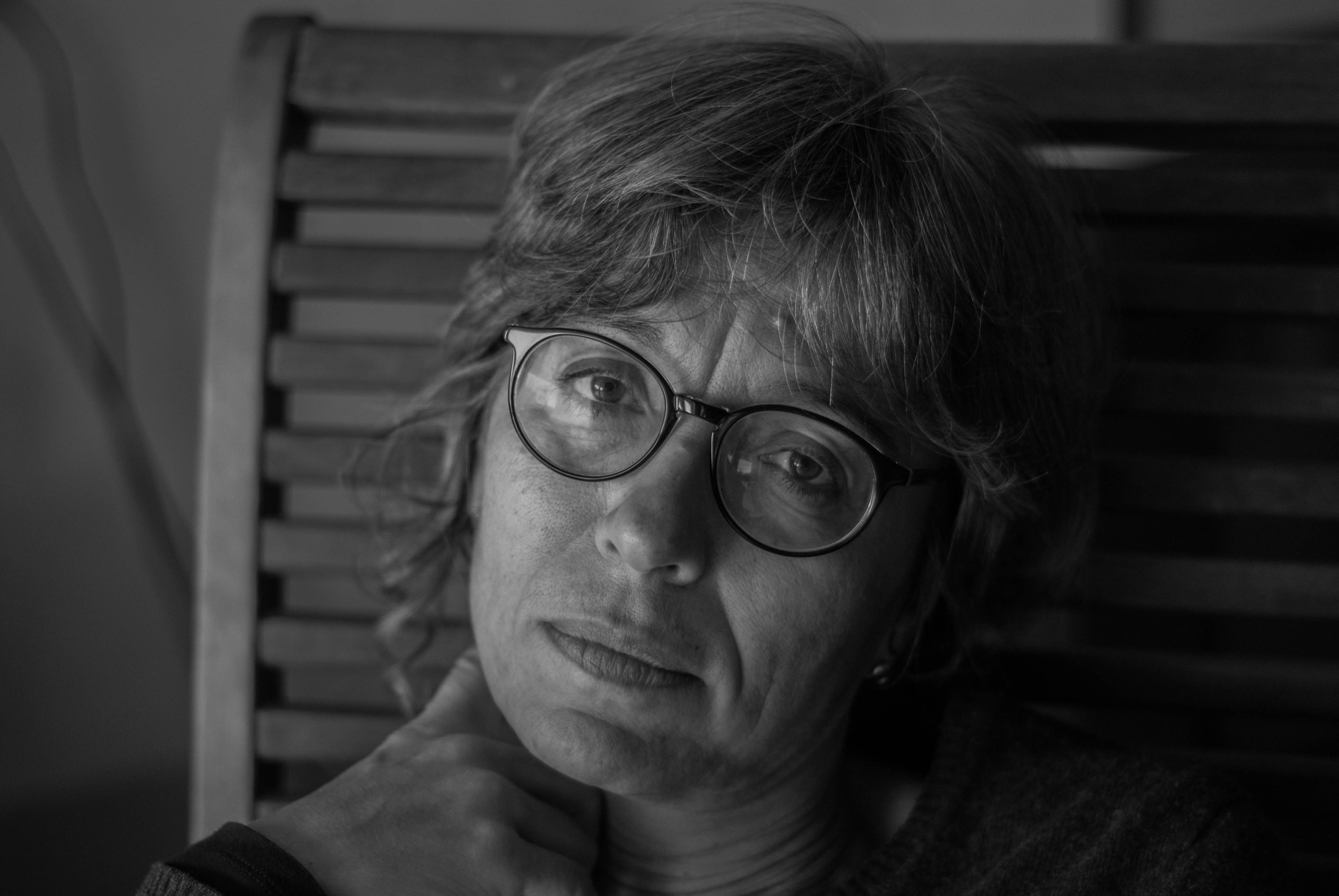
- Born: 7 February 1959 (age 67); Offida, Italy
- Education: University of Milan
- Occupations: Writer, translator, academic, blogger
- Writing career
- Language: Italian
- Years active: 1992–present
- Genres: Science fiction, noir

Nicoletta Vallorani (born 7 February 1959) is an Italian science fiction writer.

== Biography ==
Born in Offida, in the Marche region, she holds a degree in Foreign Languages with a dissertation on Contemporary American Literature, honed her writing skills as a translator and currently teaches English Language and Literature in the University of Milan, Milan.

Her work as an essayist focuses on Italian science fiction criticism, and science fiction from women in particular.

She contributed to various genre magazines, including Cosmo, La città e le stelle, Studi e ricerche sulla fantascienza and Ucronia. For Mondadori she did volume prefaces, articles, interviews, and columns.

Starting in the mid-1980s, she published novels and short-story collections.

She won the Premio Urania in 1992 with the novel Il cuore finto di DR, a science fiction/noir cross-pollination published by Mondadori under the Urania imprint the following year, and also translated into French. She also writes noir and children's literature.

In 2012 her novel Le madri cattive won the Premio Nazionale di Narrativa Maria Teresa Di Lascia. In 2020 her novel Avrai i miei occhi (Zona 42) was longlisted for the Premio Campiello and Premio Napoli.

Her latest novel is Noi siamo campo di battaglia (Zona 42)

== Bibliography ==
- Il cuore finto di DR (1992)
- Dream box (1997)
- Dentro la notte, e ciao (1995)
- La fidanzata di Zorro (1999)
- Luca De Luca detto Lince (1997)
- Pagnotta e i suoi fratelli (1997)
- Ahab e Azul (1997)
- Cuore meticcio (1998)
- I misti di Sur (1998)
- Darjee (1999)
- Le sorelle sciacallo (1999)
- Occhi di lupo (2000)
- Come una balena (2000)
- La fatona (2002)
- Eva (2002)
- Visto dal cielo (2004)
- Cordelia (2006)
- Lapponi e criceti (2010)
- Le madri cattive (2011)
- Sulla sabbia di Sur (2012)
- Hope - L'ultimo segreto del fuoco (2013)
- Le sorelle sciacallo (2017)
- Avrai i miei occhi (2020)
- Noi siamo campo di battaglia (2022)

== Work translated into English ==
- "The Catalog of Virgins" (translated by Rachel S. Cordasco), Clarkesworld magazine (2017)
