= Un Lun Dun =

2007 young adult fantasy novel by China Miéville

- First edition
- Author: China Miéville
- Illustrator: China Miéville
- Language: English
- Genre: Young adult fantasy
- Publisher: Del Rey Books
- Publication date: January 2007
- Publication place: United Kingdom
- Media type: Print (Paperback)
- Pages: 522
- ISBN: 0-230-01627-8
- OCLC: 441084286

Un Lun Dun is a young adult fantasy novel by China Miéville, released in 2007. The title is derived from 'UnLondon,' the name of the alternate realm where the book is set. It also contains illustrations by Miéville. It was first released in January 2007. The novel also won the 2008 Locus Award for Best Young Adult Book.

== Plot summary ==
The book begins with two twelve-year-old girls, Zanna and Deeba, who have begun to notice several strange things happening around them, all of them centering on Zanna.

After she and her friends are attacked by a dark cloud, Zanna spends the next two nights at Deeba's house. Deeba is awoken in the middle of the night by spies a moving broken umbrella. The girls follow it into the basement of a building, where they are drawn through a gap between the worlds of London and Un Lun Dun (or UnLondon).

UnLondon is a nonsensical mirror version of London, inhabited by various creatures and animated items that have been discarded by the inhabitants on London. A boy named Hemi saves them from a roving pile of trash but is later shooed away by the tailor Obaday Fing who reveals that the boy is a ghost who was trying to get close enough to them to possess one of them. In conversation he realises that Zanna is the "Shwazzy", a prophesied chosen one who is destined to save UnLondon from the Smog – an evil, sentient cloud of pollution.

With the help of Fing, Skool (a friend of Fing's in an old-fashioned diving suit), Conductor Jones, Rosa the bus driver, and the Slaterunners (a tribe of people who walk only on roofs), Zanna and Deeba make their way to the Propheseers where they learn more about the Smog. Apparently, after the Smog was created in London, a group of weatherwitches called the "Armets" battled it with a magic weapon called the "Klinneract." However, the Smog was not killed. Instead, it travelled to UnLondon. It is prophesied in The Book (a talking tome) that the Shwazzy would come one day and save UnLondon.

But, in spite of what is prophesied, Zanna fails in her first battle against the Smog. Brokkenbroll, master of broken umbrellas (or unbrellas) arrives in time to shoo the Smog away using a new technique he and Benjamin Unstible (a Propheseer who was presumed dead) came up with. Zanna is severely injured and is sent home with Deeba with her memories of the city erased. Instead, the city turns to Brokkenbroll and Unstible who begin handing out Smog-resistant unbrellas to defend the people of UnLondon.

However, Deeba, who still remembers UnLondon, begins to search for things related to it on the internet, hoping she can find someone to talk to. She discovers that Armets is really RMetS. This leads her to question everything she has learned. Upon further investigation she discovers that Unstible has been reported dead but that he had been studying the Clean Air Act. Just as UnLondoners misheard "RMetS" as "Armets," they misheard "Clean Air Act" as "Klinneract."

She decides to travel back to UnLondon. After several tries, she finally finds a way back. She goes to Wraithtown, the town of ghosts. With the help of Hemi she verifies Unstible's death and sets out to warn the Propheseers. Unfortunately, on the way, Deeba and Hemi are taken to Brokkenbroll, who is revealed to be working with the Smog, which has re-animated Benjamin Unstible's body.

They escape to warn the Propheseers, who refuse to listen to her. They run from them as well, escaping with The Book. The Book, although it has proved to be less-than-accurate, agrees to help them fulfil the Shwazzy's tasks and defeat the Smog in the limited time Deeba has before everyone in London forgets that she exists (this happens to everything that comes to UnLondon). Rather than take each step the Shwazzy is prophesied to do, they get the book to bring them to the final task. Deeba and Hemi are aided in their quest by Obaday, Rosa, Jones; the utterlings Diss, Bling and Cauldron; and Yorick Cavea and Curdle the milk carton. They collect the UnGun, an ultimate weapon which can be loaded with anything. Deeba, under the banner of 'the Unchosen One', uses it to defeat the Smog and save UnLondon.

== Characters ==
- Deeba: Since Deeba takes Zanna's place as the saviour of UnLondon, she is called "the Unchosen One." On Zanna's first day at Kilburn Comprehensive, Deeba is able to make her laugh, something most people cannot do. She likes to do things her own way, and is not a stereotypical hero. Along the way, she is joined by her pet milk carton, Curdle, a half-ghost named Hemi, and a talking prophecy book that often gets information wrong.
- Zanna: Zanna has the title "the Shwazzy," which is related to the French adjective "choisie," meaning "chosen". She hates her given name, "Susanna," but she hates "Sue" even more. She is tall and striking, with blond hair, but she always tries to stay in the background. This does not work very well. When she is attacked by a Stink-Junkie, a servant of the Smog, in UnLondon, she breathes in Smog and falls ill. Zanna is sent back to London by Brokkenbroll, leader of unbrellas, with her memories of UnLondon erased forever.
- Hemi: Hemi is a half-ghost, the result of a union between an UnLondoner and a dead Londoner. While normal ghosts cannot speak in a way that non-ghosts can hear them, Hemi can speak to both ghosts and non-ghosts. He has trouble fitting in because both ghosts and non-ghosts despise him for being a 'half-breed'. Most inhabitants of Wraithtown do not have to eat. Since Hemi does, he has taken to stealing or "extreme shopping," as he calls it.
- Benjamin Unstible: Was killed by Smog but brought back to life and possessed by Smog. While possessed, he was credited with developing a formula for making the unbrellas Smog-proof. In reality Brokkenbroll controlled the unbrellas and they were part of Smog's plan to take over UnLondon.
- The Smog: The Smog is a living radioactive cloud that was created by a different mixture of chemicals in the air of London. It thinks of no one but itself and consuming new gases to add to its mixture. It is also hungry for knowledge and absorbs any information contained in books that are burned and their smoke added to the mixture. The Smog attacked London years ago but was beaten by the "Klinneract", which was really the 1956 Clean Air Act; it then seeped into UnLondon and is now trying to take over UnLondon. Working for it is Brokkenbroll, the leader of unbrellas, or broken umbrellas from London. It creates servants from its Smog, such as Smombies (corpses re-animated with Smog), Smoglodytes (disfigured creatures made from Smog), and Stink-Junkies (humans forced to be addicted to the Smog).
- The Book: The Book is full of prophecies that often end up wrong, or so they think. It befriends Deeba but is first reluctant about Hemi. The one thing that he thinks is wrong about the prophecy of the Shwazzy is that it says, "The smog is afraid of Nothing and the Ungun." They think it is meant to say "The Smog is afraid of nothing BUT the Ungun."
- Giraffes: The giraffes are cannibals that use their necks to hang the skins of their victims.
- Obaday Fing: Obaday Fing is a tailor whose head is an enormous pin-cushion. He uses paper to make clothing and runs a stall in a market near Wraithtown
- Brokkenbroll: Brokkenbroll is the boss of the broken umbrellas.
- Conductor Jones
- The Propheseers
- Murgatroyd: Is the secretary of Elizabeth Rawley, the environment minister.
- Mr.Speaker
- Rosa
- Yorick Cavea

== Connection to other works ==
Though Un Lun Dun is not directly related to the Bas-Lag universe or to any of Miéville's other works, it does contain various subtle references to his other books:

- One protagonist mentions Varmin Way, which is a living street first mentioned in the short story "Reports of Certain Events in London" (found in the collection Looking for Jake).
- The Courageous Egg, a book spotted by Deeba whilst between worlds, is featured in The Scar as the book from which Shekel first learns to read.
- The Wordhoard Pit, the extensive library which connects all libraries, shares its name with a ship in The Scar, called The Wordhoard located in Armada's Haunted Quarter.
- One of the monsters created by the smog is very similar to an inchman, featured most prominently in Iron Council.

There are also some connections to other books, such as a library book entitled: A London Guide for the Blazing Worlders.

Charlie Fletcher's 2006 novel Stoneheart is also about children who travel to an alternate city named "unLondon".

Mieville's acknowledgements section mentions that the book is influenced by Lewis Carroll (author of Alice in Wonderland), and particularly Neil Gaiman for Neverwhere.
