= Three Moments of an Explosion =

Book by China Miéville

Three Moments of an Explosion: Stories
- Cover of the first U.K. hardcover edition
- Author: China Miéville
- Language: English
- Genre: Science fiction, fantasy, weird fiction, short stories
- Publisher: Pan Macmillan
- Publication date: 30 July 2015
- Publication place: United Kingdom
- Pages: 400
- ISBN: 978-0230770171

Three Moments of an Explosion: Stories is a collection of short stories by British author China Miéville. It was published in the U.K. by Pan Macmillan on 30 July 2015, and in the U.S. by Del Rey Books on 4 August 2015. It features twenty-eight short stories, ten of which had been published previously.

== Stories ==
Three Moments of an Explosion contains the following stories:

1. "Three Moments of an Explosion"
2. "Polynia"
3. "The Condition of New Death"
4. "The Dowager of Bees"
5. "In the Slopes"
6. "The Crawl"
7. "Watching God"
8. "The 9th Technique"
9. "The Rope Is the World"
10. "The Buzzard’s Egg"
11. "Säcken"
12. "Syllabus"
13. "Dreaded Outcome"
14. "After the Festival"
15. "The Dusty Hat"
16. "Escapee"
17. "The Bastard Prompt"
18. "Rules"
19. "Estate"
20. "Keep"
21. "A Second Slice Manifesto"
22. "Covehithe"
23. "The Junket"
24. "Four Final Orpheuses"
25. "The Rabbet"
26. "Listen the Birds"
27. "A Mount"
28. "The Design"

A number of the stories have been previously published. These include "The Rope is the World" (on iconeye.com, February 2010), "Covehithe" (on guardian.co.uk, 22 April 2011), "Estate" (in The White Review issue 8, August 2013), "The 9th Technique" (in The Apology Chapbook given out for free at the World Fantasy Convention 2013), "The Design" (in McSweeney's Quarterly Concern issue 45, December 2013), "Polynia" (on tor.com, July 2014), and "Säcken" (in Subtropics issue 17, Winter/Spring 2014).

In addition, the stories "Three Moments of an Explosion", "The Crawl", and "Four Final Orpheuses" were first published on the author's blog Rejectamentalist Manifesto.

The remaining eighteen stories are new to this collection.

== Reception ==
Publishers Weekly gave the book a starred review, saying Miéville "moves effortlessly among realism, fantasy, and surrealism in this dark, sometimes horrific short story collection" and that the stories' characters are "invariably well drawn and compelling". The review concludes by stating that "what the stories have in common is a sense that the world is not just strange, but stranger than we can ever really comprehend."

Kirkus Reviews also gave a starred review, stating that in the book, "horror, noir, fantasy, politics, and poetry swirl into combinations as satisfying intellectually as they are emotionally". The review summarized Miéville's style as "Bradbury meets Borges, with Lovecraft gibbering tumultuously just out of hearing."

== Adaptations ==
The short story "Estate" was adapted into a 26-minute film, released in 2020.
