= King Rat (Miéville novel) =

1998 novel by China Miéville

- First edition
- Author: China Miéville
- Cover artist: Mark Moran
- Language: English
- Genre: Urban fantasy
- Publisher: Macmillan
- Publication date: 1998
- Publication place: United Kingdom
- Media type: Print (paperback)
- Pages: 333
- ISBN: 0-333-73881-0
- OCLC: 41835159
- Dewey Decimal: 823/.914 21
- LC Class: PR6063.I265 K56 1999

King Rat is an urban fantasy novel by British writer China Miéville, published in 1998. Unlike his Bas-Lag novels, it is set in London during the late 1990s. It follows the life of Saul Garamond after the death of his father and his meeting with King Rat. As King Rat takes Saul under his wing, the young man is quickly embroiled in a centuries-old rivalry. King Rat was Miéville's debut novel.

== Plot summary ==
Saul Garamond returns to the flat he shares with his father in London late one evening, skipping on greetings and heading straight to bed. In the morning he is awakened by police pounding on the door, come to arrest him. It appears he is the lone suspect in his father's murder case. After spending most of a day being interrogated and in a holding cell, Saul finds he has a mysterious visitor, who introduces himself as King Rat. The two begin a one sided rooftop escape as King Rat carries Saul along. At the end of this journey, King Rat reveals to Saul that he is his uncle by way of Saul's mother being a rat and also that Saul has been set up to take the fall for his father's death.

Saul follows King Rat exploring the secrets of London, from the rooftops to the sewers. Being half rat, his two primary abilities are being able to eat anything, even garbage, and squeezing into holes and shadows too small for other creatures. Meanwhile, Saul's friend Natasha Karadjian, a drum and bass musician, begins to write and record new music with a flautist named Pete. Two of their other mutual friends, Fabian and Kay, are unnerved by this stranger but find it hard not to like the music the two are making. These friends are also being pursued by the police for any information on Saul's whereabouts. After spending several days with King Rat, Saul hears whispers of the return of the Ratcatcher.

This prompts King Rat to gather allies, Anansi, the spider king, and Loplop, the bird king; they are prompted to join him for their own reasons—the Ratcatcher is also after the Spidercatcher and Birdcatcher, their enemy as well. So, King Rat relates the story of living in Hamelin, the last time he really was king. But he was displaced, of course, by the Pied Piper of Hamelin and his flute. It is revealed that now the Piper travels the world seeking pests so he may kill for the fun of it. The three animal kings end the story by swearing revenge.

Even with his newfound powers, Saul is forced to stay in the shadows with King Rat, but cannot forget his own friends and past. He visits Kay but the two no longer understand each other. This visit leads to Pete, being revealed as the returned Piper, finding and murdering Kay. Meanwhile, the animal kings' plans begin to fall short and they drift apart. Saul begins to push his new boundaries and explore London on his own. During this time, he meets Deborah, a vagrant. Together they return to Saul's former flat, where he finds his father's old notebook. Here finds an entry about an attack on his mother nine months before his own birth. He realises he is not King Rat's nephew but his son, by way of rape and that everything since his father's death has been a set up by King Rat, who must therefore be the murderer of the man Saul considers his father.

As they discover these facts, the Piper confronts Saul and Deborah. He kills Deborah but Loplop saves Saul. The piper reveals that he cannot control Saul as he can the others, as the Piper can only play one song at a time and as such a tune that controls rats will be ignored by Saul's human side and vice versa. Saul returns to the sewers to confront King Rat, leading to a falling-out. He wants to go his own way and leave the Piper to the animal kings. Natasha and Pete have set up an act at a club, Jungle, to debut their music. Fabian is interrogated by the police again and he realises that the flute left behind when Saul was attacked belongs to Pete. He calls the police to meet him at Natasha's home but arriving ahead of them he is wounded and both he and Natasha are taken by the Piper.

After wandering for a few days, Saul meets up with Anansi, who informs him of Kay's death by the Piper. He begins to notice something is wrong in the sewer as well, as the rats have disappeared, their scratching replaced by a new sound, music. He traces the sound back to King Rat's throne room, now filled with dancing and dead rats; who along with King Rat are mesmerised by the music playing on a ghetto blaster. Saul realises the title on the tape within is written in Natasha's handwriting. He finds a poster for Natasha and the Piper's show, and despite knowing it is a trap, he goes to save his friends.

Saul sneaks into the club with his new rat allies and Anansi leading the spiders. Loplop, left deaf by Saul during the Piper's first attack is unable to rally his birds. However, when Natasha takes the stage to spin her records, Pete throws her a DAT, which has his flute samples on it. The layering of tracks allows the Piper to play several tunes at once, controlling the rats, clubbers and spiders all at once.

Unable to defend himself Anansi is killed by the Piper and Saul is overwhelmed. However, King Rat bursts from under the stage and attacks the Piper, but proves to be only a momentary distraction. With the musical fusion playing, the entire club is under the Piper's control and all he wants to kill Saul, who will not dance for him. The music does not mesh: instead of one solo flute, two flutes compete for the overlying sound. This dissonance causes Saul to regain control just as the Piper attempts to kill him; he dodges the blow and resists the Piper. The Piper knows he cannot win a physical fight, so he tears a hole in reality by playing his flute through which he can escape, just as he tore a hole in the mountain to hide the children of Hamelin. King Rat attacks the Piper with the Piper's own flute; they both fall into the rent but King Rat jumps away, and suddenly the hole closes, the Piper on the other side.

Saul and King Rat are unsung heroes of the club but they both know they can never be a part of the world they just saved. King Rat still wants his kingdom back from Saul. Saul refuses to give in and knows that if the Piper returns, King Rat will still need him, so he can't be killed to restore complete order to the rat kingdom. Saul then gathers his own band of rats and lies about King Rat's contribution, painting him as a coward and ensuring the rats will never again follow him. Saul makes the declaration that King Rat is not the one true leader of all rats and he is not Prince Rat, but he is one of them, Citizen Rat.

== Main characters ==
- Saul Garamond: Primary protagonist, a half human, half rat hybrid, due to being King Rat's son. Being hunted by the Piper, who wants to either control him or kill him.
- King Rat: Title character, fallen king of the rats, father of Saul, and locked into a centuries long feud with the Piper.
- The Piper: Primary antagonist, the famous Pied Piper of Hamelin, has returned to continue his feud with King Rat. He is searching for a way to control or kill animal and human hybrids like Saul.
- Anansi: King of the spiders, an ally to King Rat, and mentor to Saul, while he is still exploring his new powers.
- Loplop: King of the birds, an ally to King Rat, saves Saul during his first disastrous confrontation with the Piper.
- Natasha Karadjian: Saul's friend from before his life changed, a drum and bass musician, she is being used by the Piper as a way to discover new music to control animal and human hybrids.

== Reception ==
Reviewing the book for The Magazine of Fantasy & Science Fiction, Charles de Lint praised King Rat as "a riveting, brilliant novel... the inspired mingling of old mythic matter with the contemporary world, ... an utter delight."

== Award nominations ==
Award	Year	Result
Bram Stoker Award, First Novel	1999	Nominee
International Horror Guild Award, First Novel	1999	Nominee
