= The City & the City =

2009 science fiction novel by China Miéville

- UK first edition cover
- Author: China Miéville
- Cover artist: Christopher Papasadero
- Language: English
- Genre: Crime, Weird fiction
- Publisher: Macmillan
- Publication date: 15 May 2009
- Publication place: United Kingdom
- Media type: Print (hardcover)
- Pages: 312
- Award: Hugo Award for Best Novel; BSFA Award for Best Novel; Locus Award for Best Fantasy Novel; Arthur C. Clarke Award; World Fantasy Award for Best Novel; Kitschies Red Tentacle; Kurd-Laßwitz-Preis for Best Foreign Work
- ISBN: 1-4050-0017-1
- OCLC: 316836327

The City & the City is a novel by British author China Miéville that follows a wide-reaching murder investigation in two cities that exist side by side, each of whose citizens are forbidden to go into or acknowledge the other city, combining weird fiction with the police procedural. It was written as a gift for Miéville's terminally ill mother, who was a fan of the latter genre. The novel was published by Macmillan on 15 May 2009.

The novel won the Locus Award for Best Fantasy Novel, Arthur C. Clarke Award, World Fantasy Award, BSFA Award and the Kitschies Red Tentacle; tied for the 2010 Hugo Award for Best Novel, and was nominated for a Nebula Award and John W. Campbell Memorial Award for Best Science Fiction Novel.

A four-part television adaptation by the BBC was broadcast in 2018.

== Synopsis ==
Inspector Tyador Borlú, of the Extreme Crime Squad in the fictional East European city-state of Besźel, investigates the murder of Mahalia Geary, a foreign student found dead in a Besźel street with her face disfigured. He soon learns that Geary had been involved in the political and cultural turmoil involving Besźel and its "twin city" of Ul Qoma. His investigations, which start in his home city of Besźel, lead him to Ul Qoma to assist the Ul Qoman police in their work, and eventually result in an examination of the legend of Orciny, a rumoured third city existing in the spaces between Besźel and Ul Qoma.

== Setting ==
The City & the City takes place in the fictional Eastern European twin city-states of Besźel and Ul Qoma.

A precise location is not confirmed, but they are close to the sea as Besźel is noted as having developed on a "curl of coastline" from "a port hiding a few kilometres up the river to shelter from the pirates of the shore." Other references in the novel remain vague, but indicate the cities are to the east of Hungary, north of Turkey and are within relatively close driving distance of Varna, Bulgaria and Bucharest, Romania, suggesting a location in the Balkans near the Black Sea.

These two cities actually occupy much of the same geographical space, but via the volition of their citizens (and the threat of the secret power known as Breach), they are perceived as two different cities. A denizen of one city must dutifully "unsee" (that is, consciously erase from their mind or fade into the background) the denizens, buildings, and events taking place in the other city – even if they are an inch away. This separation is emphasised by the style of clothing, architecture, gait, and the way denizens of each city generally carry themselves. Residents of the cities are taught from childhood to recognise things belonging to the other city without actually seeing them. Ignoring the separation, even by accident, is called "breaching" – a terrible crime for the citizens of the two cities, even worse than murder. The origin of this odd situation is unclear, as it started at an uncertain time in the past, perhaps before recorded European history. Residents of the cities speak different languages that use distinct alphabets. Besź is written in a Greek-derived alphabet resembling Cyrillic while Illitan, the language of Ul Qoma, is written in a Latin alphabet. However, Besź and Illitan have a common root and share a degree of mutual intelligibility. The cities also have different religions: Besźel's state religion is the Besź Orthodox Church and there is a small Jewish and Muslim community, while Ul Qoma is officially secular, though religions other than the Temple of the Divine Light face discrimination.

The twin cities are composed of crosshatched, alter, and total areas. Total areas are entirely in one city, the city in which the observer currently resides. Alter areas are completely in the other city, and so must be completely avoided and ignored. Between these are areas of crosshatch. These might be streets, parks or squares where denizens of both cities walk alongside one another, albeit "unseen". Areas that exist in both cities usually go under different names in each one. There is also Copula Hall, "one of the very few" buildings to exist in both cities under the same name. Rather than being cross-hatched, it essentially functions as a border. It is the only way in which one can legally and officially pass from one city to another. Passing through the border passage takes travellers, geographically (or "grosstopically"), to the exact place they started from – only in a different city.

From a physical standpoint, little differentiates the two cities, other than slight differences of architecture, vehicles and styles of dress which citizens and visitors are trained to recognise. Those who do not know about the separation might naturally view the two cities as one. Because of this, an extra power is needed to keep the separation in place: this organisation is known as Breach. When a "breach" takes place (used here in the sense of "breaching" the barrier between the two cities), Breach comes to take care of it. Members of the Breach organisation use their powers to take the breacher captive, and bring them to an unknown punishment. Most "breachers", as they are called, disappear and are never seen again. Children and tourists, however, are treated more leniently: children may be forgiven for a small breach; if tourists breach, they are bundled out and banned from both cities forever.

Most breaches are taken care of by Breach immediately, but its surveillance capabilities are not absolute. Sometimes Breach must be specifically invoked to investigate a crime that seems to be a clear-cut case of breach, such as a smuggling operation that involves breaching to transport the smuggled goods from one city to the other. To invoke Breach, the police must present their evidence to an Oversight Committee composed of 42 members, 21 from each city. If the evidence presented is convincing enough, the Committee performs whatever other investigation into the matter it deems appropriate to resolve any remaining doubts its members have. If its investigation concludes to its satisfaction that a breach has taken place, then and only then will it invoke Breach. Invoking Breach is a last resort because it is an alien power to which some consider that Besźel and Ul Qoma surrender their sovereignty at their peril.

== Reception ==
Reviewing the book for The Guardian, Michael Moorcock concludes:

As in no previous novel, the author celebrates and enhances the genre he loves and has never rejected. On many levels this novel is a testament to his admirable integrity. Keeping his grip firmly on an idea which would quickly slip from the hands of a less skilled writer, Miéville again proves himself as intelligent as he is original.

Andrew McKie reviewed the book for The Spectator and suggested:

the hallucinatory aspects of the book owe more to Borges, or perhaps Les Gommes, Alain Robbe-Grillet's subversion of the policier. Most impressively, Miéville’s underlying point, that all city-dwellers collude in ignoring real aspects of the cities in which they live – the homeless, political structures, the commercial world or the stuff that's 'for the tourists' – is never laboured. This is Miéville’s most accomplished novel since Perdido Street Station. It deserves an audience among those who would run a mile from his other books: it is fantastic in the careless, colloquial sense, too.

== Awards ==
Tor.com described The City and the City as "the most awarded book in the history of books" (referring to the history of speculative fiction) prior to Ancillary Justice. Its accolades include the 2010 Hugo Award for Best Novel, where it tied with Paolo Bacigalupi's The Windup Girl.

Awards
Year	Award	Result	Ref.
2009	Nebula Award	Finalist	
2009	BSFA Award	Won	
2010	Arthur C. Clarke Award	Won	
2010	Hugo Award	Won	
2010	John W. Campbell Memorial Award	Finalist	
2010	The Kitschies	Won	
2010	Locus Award	Won	
2010	World Fantasy Award	Won	
2011	Kurd-Laßwitz-Preis	Won	
2012	Grand Prix de l'Imaginaire	Won	
2013	Premio Ignotus	Won	

== Stage and television ==
The City & the City was adapted into a play by Christopher M. Walsh. The show premièred at Lifeline Theatre of Chicago in February 2013. It was Jeff recommended.

In April 2018, BBC Two broadcast an adaptation by Tony Grisoni, with David Morrissey as Inspector Tyador Borlú. Mammoth Screen is the production company. The series consists of four 60-minute episodes.
