= Creagh =

Creagh is an Irish surname derived from the Gaelic word Craobhach, meaning "branch". The surname originates from the O'Neill dynasty of County Clare, as one of their ancestors reportedly carried a green branch into battle. According to historian C. Thomas Cairney, the Creaghs were one of the chiefly families of the Dal gCais or Dalcassians who were a tribe of the Erainn who were the second wave of Celts to settle in Ireland between about 500 and 100 BC.

Many spelling variations of the surname Creagh can be found in archives. One of the reasons for these variations is ancient scribes and church officials recorded names as they were pronounced, often resulting in a single person being recorded under several different spellings. The different spellings that were found include Creagh, Crear, Creag, Creavagh, Cray, Cree and others.

== Surname ==
- Alison Creagh (born 1962), Australian brigadier
- Andy Creagh (1953–2010), Irish Gaelic footballer and hurler
- Ben Creagh (born 1985), Australian rugby league player
- Charles Vandeleur Creagh (1842–1917), British colonial administrator
- David Nial Creagh (1928–2019), British Irish general
- Frank Creagh (1924–1998), New Zealand boxer
- Gethin Creagh, New Zealand sound engineer
- John Creagh (1870–1947), Irish priest and missionary
- Juan José Creagh (1765–1829), Spanish general of Irish origin
- Kieran Creagh, Northern Irish priest
- Liam Creagh (born 1959), Northern Irish businessman and journalist
- Mary Creagh (born 1967), British politician
- Michael Creagh (died 1738), Irish politician
- Michael Creagh (1845–1895), Irish-born New Zealand cricketer
- Michael O'Moore Creagh (1892–1970), British Irish general
- O'Moore Creagh (1848–1923), British Irish general and recipient of the Victoria Cross
- Patrick Creagh (1930–2012), British poet and translator
- Richard Creagh (1523–1586), Irish Catholic bishop and martyr
- Ronald Creagh (1929–2023), French sociologist and anarchist
- Vince Creagh (1876–1909), Australian politician
- William Creagh (died 1469), Irish Catholic bishop

=== Middle name ===
- Charles Creagh-Osborne (1823–1892), British general
- Gordon MacCreagh (1889–1953), American author
- Pierse Creagh Loftus (1877–1956), British Irish politician and businessman
- Richard Creagh-Osborne (1928–1980), British sailor
- Stephen Creagh Sandes (1778–1842), Irish bishop

== See also ==
- List of villages in Northern Ireland
- List of towns in Northern Ireland
- Clan McGrath
- Irish clans
