= Creagh (disambiguation) =

Creagh may refer to:

== People ==
- Ben Creagh, Australian Rugby player
- Frank Creagh, New Zealand boxer
- Michael Creagh (politician), Irish politician and soldier
- Patrick Creagh (1930–2012), British poet and translator
- Garrett O'Moore Creagh, British officer
- Michael O'Moore Creagh, British officer

== Placenames ==
- Creagh, County Cork, a civil parish in County Cork, Republic of Ireland
- Creagh, County Fermanagh, a townland in County Fermanagh, Northern Ireland
- Creagh, a civil parish in County Galway and County Roscommon, Republic of Ireland
