= Cray (disambiguation) =

Cray is a supercomputer manufacturer based in Seattle, Washington, US.

Cray may also refer to:

- Crayfish

== Places ==
=== United Kingdom ===
- River Cray, London, England
- North Cray, a village on the outskirts of London, England
- Cray, North Yorkshire, a village in England
- Cray, Perth and Kinross, a location in Scotland
- Cray, Powys, a community in Wales
- Cray Reservoir, a reservoir on the Afon Crai in the Brecon Beacons, Wales

=== Elsewhere ===
- Cray (crater), on Mars

== Fiction ==
- Cray (Bas-Lag), a fictional race in China Miéville's fiction
- Cray, a character from the Breath of Fire IV role-playing game
- Damian Cray, a character in the Alex Rider series

== Other uses ==
- Cray (surname), a list of people
- Cray Wanderers F.C., a football club based in Bromley, England

== See also ==
- Crays Pond
- Kray (disambiguation)
