= Michael Creagh =

Michael Creagh may refer to:

- Sir Michael Creagh (politician), Irish politician and soldier
- Sir Michael O'Moore Creagh, British Army officer
- Michael Creagh (cricketer), New Zealand cricketer
