= Perdido Street Station =

2000 novel by China Miéville

- Cover of first UK edition
- Author: China Miéville
- Illustrator: Edward Miller
- Language: English
- Series: Bas-Lag novels
- Genre: Speculative fiction
- Publisher: Macmillan
- Publication date: 2000
- Publication place: United Kingdom
- Media type: Print (hardback & paperback)
- Pages: 867
- ISBN: 0-333-78172-4
- OCLC: 42912755
- Followed by: The Scar

Perdido Street Station is a novel by British writer China Miéville, published in 2000 by Macmillan. It is the first in a series set in the fictional world of Bas-Lag, and is followed by the independent works The Scar and Iron Council. It is home to various intelligent races, a form of magic called "thaumaturgy," and a technological and scientific development consistent with the early capitalism of the Industrial Revolution. The novel is set in the city-state of New Crobuzon, a dystopian industrial metropolis characterized by social stratification, economic exploitation, and partial segregation. Xenophobia is rampant, and cruel corporal punishment magically transforms convicts into "remade," a despised class. The dictatorial government is in cahoots with big business and organized crime. The plot centers on the heroes' struggle against colossal winged monsters that threaten the existence of a densely populated city. The protagonist, dissident scientist Isaac Dan der Grimnebulin, seeks a way to destroy the monsters and save his lover, the artist Lin, a member of the beetle-headed khepri race, from a crime boss.

The novel received positive reviews from critics, won several awards including the Arthur C. Clarke award, and attracted the attention of academic researchers. Critics praised the characterization of New Crobuzon, the novel's scale, the detailed and convincing world-building, the author's inventiveness, and the engaging storytelling. Genre-wise, the book combines elements of fantasy, science fiction, horror, and steampunk. The novel has been seen as a left-wing critique of postmodern capitalism (post-Fordism or neoliberalism), as a reflection on cultural diversity, as an exploration of the space of the modern city (including a revision of the classic totalitarian dystopias of Orwell and Zamyatin in the direction of an “urban dystopia”), as a discussion of the problems of racism and racialization, as well as issues affecting group solidarity, utopian alternatives and ethical choice.

== World ==
=== Bas Lag ===
Perdido Street Station is primarily set in the city-state of New Crobuzon, the most powerful political and economic entity, in the world known as Bas-Lag. The city's development roughly corresponds to early capitalism during the Industrial Revolution. New Crobuzon uses the steam engine, gas lamps, airships, railways, including aerial ones, as well as heliotypes—analogs of photographs—and steam-powered computer technology in the form of "constructs," small machines, or robots. Steam power as a means of production is supplemented by magic, "thaumaturgy," and other energy sources, primarily magical, are sought. Practical magic is closer to engineering than to magic. New Crobuzon is an ancient city, "built amid the bones of a gigantic ancient animal", with a history spanning nearly two thousand years, but in decline. Fragmentary information suggests that science and technology were once more advanced, leaving some elements of it intact. For example, a "cloud tower" that controlled the weather towered over the city; this technology has been lost, and the tower's "aeromorphic" motor cannot be restored to working order. Vast and densely populated, New Crobuzon is prone to decay and pollution, and is plagued by crime and disease. The author describes the metropolis as "a gigantic breeding ground for infection, a plague pit," teeming with "parasites, infection and rumour".

=== The city-state of New Crobuzon ===
New Crobuzon is a multicultural city with many immigrants, consisting of "a series of districts with strange architecture", each a miniature city, a collection of disparate elements. Districts are governed by their own rules and may or may not be isolated. New Crobuzon and Bas-Lag are inhabited by humans, the most common species, and non-human intelligent races, collectively called xenii. Each species has its own history, culture, and language. Khepri have the head of a beetle and the body of a woman; their males are mindless insects. The Vodyanoi are amphibious aquatic creatures that resemble frogs and can manipulate water. The cactacae are tall, cactus-like beings distinguished by their size, strength, and endurance, and are therefore valued as workers and soldiers. Individualist garuda have human bodies but bird-like features; they are covered in feathers and capable of flight using large wings. All races are roughly equal in intelligence and other qualities, possessing the capacity for friendship and love, political and economic activity and individual characters. There are few profound differences between them, as indicated, for example, by the joint strike of human and water dockers. Strange creatures called hand lingers are disembodied parasites, "hands" that control the minds of their hosts. According to one version, these are the spirits of evil and vile dead people. Thanks to their psychic abilities, handlingers occupy high positions in the city, collaborating with the government. For example, Montjon Rescue, the mayor's assistant is a handlinger.

New Crobuzon, nominally a parliamentary city-state, is ruled by an imperialist oligarchy—a dictatorial government led by Mayor Bentham Rudgutter and his authoritarian Fat Sun Party. The government, in collusion with big business and organized crime, relies on a secret paramilitary force—the militia. The militia "dislikes operating in the open," using a "vast network of informants", and maintaining a constant, "pervasive" fear in the city. There is no freedom of speech in New Crobuzon, and elections are held through a corrupt Electoral Lottery that maintains the status quo. Political parties sometimes resemble shadowy cults. The city is highly socially stratified, with its space divided both horizontally and vertically into different levels of social and economic privilege, although the boundaries between them are fluid and unstable; cities within cities are constantly disintegrating, with privileged areas losing their status. The authorities exploit poverty and the appearance of difference for state oppression, creating informal structures of segregation, and exploiting marginalized populations, seeing them as both a resource and a threat. For example, the Cactacae and Khepri live in ghettos; the latter once lost their homeland to a “heavenly apocalypse” they called the Devastation – a terrible tornado killed most of the Khepri, leaving only a handful of fugitives. The Garuda, the outsiders of outsiders, occupy formerly abandoned high-rise buildings in the ghetto of Raspelovy, the poorest district on the outskirts of the city. The wealthiest cactacae live in a heavily guarded and almost completely isolated structure, the Glasshouse, a colossal flattened dome of metal and glass, which maintains the natural dry climate. New Crobuzon is characterized by xenophobia between races, particularly towards other races, as humans are the most powerful species, dominating business and science. These unequal relationships include cruel and unfair prejudices and stereotypes. Xenia have only recently gained basic rights (for example, university degrees have only become available to them in the last 20 years). Sex between humans and xenia occurs, but is usually commercial. The authorities use xenophobia to maintain power and to divide the working class.

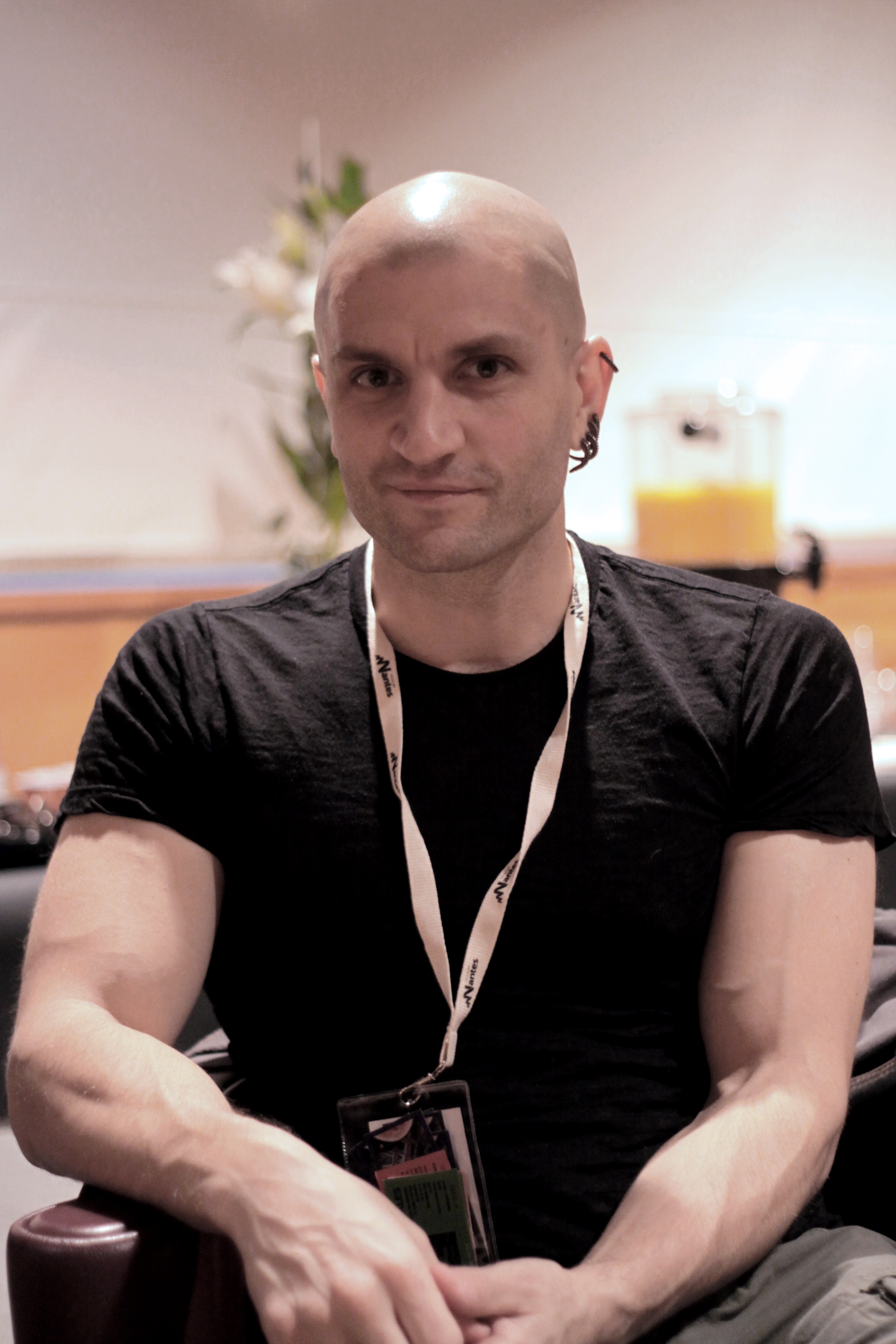
China Miéville

In New Crobuzon, alteration is common—various types of bodily deformations that are accomplished through both science (surgery) and magic ("biothaumaturgy"). During alteration at the penal factories, organic or mechanical parts, such as pipes, shovels, tentacles, claws, are amputated or added. Those altered become, accordingly, either hybrids or cyborgs. Alteration is most often performed on humans, but sometimes on members of other species. Alteration is often a criminal punishment in the New Crobuzon "justice" system, but can also be voluntary. The Remade are used for slave labour (they maintain urban infrastructure and provide supplies), for commercial purposes: gladiatorial combat or prostitution. The symbolism and vileness of corporal punishment is meant to reflect the crime committed or to serve a specific purpose required by the state. This may include sewing the mouth shut for the accused's refusal to "speak," attaching the hands of a child killed by its mother to her face, or crudely sticking feathers into her skin. The remade are ostracized out of disgust at their unnaturalness, rather than because of slavery or crimes; they are perceived almost as a separate race. The lower classes of the remade begin to acquire class consciousness and resist oppression, forming a group; they are popularly regarded as outcasts and terrorists, sometimes as heroes. In the city, a secret organization of the Remade is led by the legendary Jack-Half-Prayer, the local Robin Hood, an escaped anarchist from prison and a symbol of revolutionary hopes.

=== Perdido street station ===
Perdido Street Station, (Note: Perdido in Portuguese means "lost" or "astray".) which gives the work its title, is the city's largest architectural structure and its main transportation hub, the terminus of both the railways and the overhead rails. The colossal building, in the spirit of Antoni Gaudí, was designed by an architect who later went mad. It is an "industrial castle, bristling with disjointed parapet projections," its "five enormous, gaping brick mouths" swallowing the railway lines, whose rails, like "giant tongues," spread "along the vaulted spans." The womb of the station is filled with "shops, torture chambers, workshops, offices...". In the underground tunnels beneath the train station dwells the mighty Weaver, a massive, black, arachnid creature with a teardrop-shaped body, eight pointed legs, and a pair of childlike arms. The enigmatic Weaver possesses superhuman strength and primarily inhabits other dimensions. It weaves an endless "world web"—the fabric of the universe. Hell also exists in another dimension, and the city's corrupt authorities regularly contract with the Devil.

The city's constructs have evolved into an artificial intelligence, the Council of Constructs, which accidentally spawned itself (in the spirit of Prigogine's "order from chaos") from a pile of scrap metal and became a single entity. It is a composite of countless discarded parts. Its power and ambition grows as the number of components increases, becoming more complex, spreading like a virus and threatening to engulf the entire city.

== Plot ==
Isaac Dan der Grimnebulin is a scientist living in the city of New Crobuzon. He is approached by Yagharek, a member of a birdlike species known as garuda, who has had his wings removed as a punishment for an undisclosed crime in his native land. He asks Isaac to help him to fly again. Isaac agrees and starts collecting flying creatures for research purposes with the aid of Lemuel Pigeon, a fence with links to the criminal underworld. One creature is a large and unusual caterpillar, stolen from a government research lab. The caterpillar sickens until Isaac accidentally discovers it feeds on a popular hallucinogenic drug. It grows and starts to pupate. After reaching maturity, it emerges as a monstrous flying beast known as a slakemoth, able to paralyse its victims using hypnotic patterns on its wings. It escapes after eating the mind of one of Isaac's colleagues, leaving him catatonic. Isaac, Yagharek and Lemuel resolve to re-capture or destroy it.

Isaac's girlfriend Lin is a khepri, an insect-like humanoid and an artist. She is commissioned by Mr Motley, a mob boss, to make a sculpture of him. Mr. Motley has four more of the slakemoths in captivity and harvests their milk to sell as drugs. After Isaac's slakemoth frees its siblings, Mr Motley discovers Isaac's connection to the slakemoths. Assuming Isaac to be a potential rival in the drug trade, he imprisons Lin, demanding that Isaac return his creatures. The slakemoths start to terrorise New Crobuzon, feeding on its inhabitants.

With the aid of Derkhan, a journalist and friend of Lin, Isaac discovers that Mr. Motley purchased his slakemoths from the government. The government become aware of the activities of the slakemoths and begin to suppress the various rebellious elements within the city. To re-capture the slakemoths, they attempt to enlist the help of demons and the Weaver, a spider-like creature who moves through dimensions, obsessed with patterns and its own peculiar view of beauty. The demons refuse to assist and the Weaver soon ends up aiding Isaac.

Isaac and his friends kill one of the slakemoths with the aid of a sentient machine known as the Construct Council. They then destroy the eggs that the slakemoths have laid before laying a trap for the remainder of the creatures. The trap is mostly successful, but the last slakemoth escapes and returns 'home' to Mr. Motley's facility. The Weaver transports Isaac to the warehouse where they find Lin, who has been tortured but is still working on the sculpture. A confrontation occurs, during which Lin's mind is half eaten and the last slakemoth is killed by Mr. Motley's men. Isaac escapes with Lin and Yagharek and prepares to leave the city. Isaac learns of Yagharek's crime, a rape of one of his own species, and declines to help him fly again. Lin never fully recovers and Yagharek is left alone in the city, pulling out his feathers and having to accept his new flightless identity.

== Critic reviews ==
The novel received positive reviews from critics, who noted its complexity and scope, the elaboration of details, and its completeness, as well as the credibility and plausibility of the world. Critics praised the author's inventiveness and the story's fascination, considering the main achievement to be New Crobuzon, which is also the main character of the novel.

Michael Moorcock

Michael Moorcock, reviewing the book for The Spectator, called it "a massive and gorgeously detailed parallel-world fantasy" with "a range of rather more exotic creatures, all of whom are wonderfully drawn," and praised Mieville as "a writer with a rare descriptive gift, an unusually observant eye for physical detail, for the sensuality and beauty of the ordinarily human as well as the thoroughly alien." However, he suggests "Mieville's determination to deliver value for money, a great page-turner, leads him to add genre borrowings which set up a misleading expectation of the kind of plot you're going to get and make individuals start behaving out of character, forcing the author into rationalisations at odds with the creative, intellectual and imaginative substance of the book".

Brian Stableford

Brian Stableford called the "stunning" book the most compelling in British fantasy since Robert Irwin's The Arabian Nightmare. The work's central conflict involves the outsiders of New Crobuzon, "individualists who have rejected the burdens of civilization" who combine animal and divine traits. Battling a terrible threat, the heroes realize they must win, even if victory proves to be only the lesser evil. As Stableford noted, the ending of the novel is the only possible one for fantasy, affirming moral and intellectual responsibility. After the victory over evil, hope arises for a possible future, albeit distant, human utopia in place of the deformed city. Stableford described the depiction of New Crobuzon as a "productive phantasmagoria", capable of producing a depressing effect, like the paintings of Bosch and Bruegel. In the critic's opinion, this picture, no more terrible than the criminal London of Miéville's first novel, King Rat, however, for all its ugliness, New Crobuzon is more a Garden of Earthly Delights than a purgatory; the city, being modern, is in the "throes of progress" (in this respect, the author, according to the critic, makes an improvement compared to the first novel): the "hideous sprawl" of New Crobuzon can lead to a better world.

Norman Spinrad

Norman Spinrad has noted the novel's similarities to Mervyn Peake's Gormenghast in terms of its large scale, setting, and protagonist—Peake's vast, dilapidated Gothic mansion; Miéville's Victorian city also appears Gothic and slowly decays, perhaps over a thousand years. The characters in Station are much more vivid, the complex plot more dynamic and clearly delineated; beyond the vast expanse of New Crobuzon, there clearly exists a "vast and varied" world. According to Spinrad, New Crobuzon can also be considered a "Dickensian", Victorian London, in which "retrotechnology" organically coexists with magic, giving rise to a strange mixture of fantasy and "steampunk", and which is reminiscent of Moorcock's "London, My Love". Spinrad drew attention to the epigraph from Dick's "We Will Build You", reflecting the almost complete immersion of the characters in the reality of the city. Mieville, according to Spinrad, follows Dick, who presented fantasy to readers in the wrapping of science fiction, (Note: Spinrad noted that while Dick's science fiction was far from "steampunk fantasy," the writer, in rejecting conventional reality, was perhaps closer to magic than most fantasy.) although with significant differences: Victorian magic and science are in approximately the same state of decline (and were previously more developed), which points to science fiction; Yet the author's world is entirely fictional, unrelated to ordinary reality, to fantasy "images, tropes, or cultural myths," or to the techniques of science fiction, which leave readers in a "multiverse of their own possibilities". Although the author maintains the "illusion of mimesis" without entering the realm of surrealism (in which the relationship to reality is unimportant), (Note: Spinrad explains the refusal to take this step by the fact that fantasy originally infiltrated science fiction, and here science fiction “tropes and devices” infiltrate fantasy.) the question of whether the novel is "science fiction that knows it is science fiction" or "fantasy in the guise of science fiction" is irrelevant: according to Spinrad, "it is a fiction that not only knows but proclaims that it is fiction".

Mark Bould

Literary and media academic Mark Bould described the novel as "a superb example of the hallucinogenic sleep-dream genre mutating into socialist science fiction," noting the gripping story's combination of both novelty and familiar elements, such as the creatures (birds, spiders, hybrids, etc.) from King Rat. Bould praised the author's writing style, noting a precision and empathy akin to Dick's best in the depiction of characters and settings; Miéville "builds layers of texture rather than ornament." Bould believed that the clarity and precision of the style counterbalanced a revelry in language that was even more pronounced than in the debut novel (an unfortunate aspect of King Rat). As Bould wrote, the book embodies the ethical message outlined in King Rat: if in the earlier work the deliberate attempt to connect the world of the text and the real world seemed clumsy and didactic, then in Station... this task is accomplished more smoothly, "ethical and empathic moments occur in the thickness of interconnections". Thus, a brothel with remade prostitutes and an act of betrayal turn out to be the source of mutual understanding; the heroes’ visit to the Cirque du Freak, instead of further grotesquery, shows “depravity, misanthropy, and complacency”; descriptions of mutilation and torture, characteristic of the works of Tim Powers, are placed by the author, according to Bould, in a "political and ethical, rather than mythopoetic context". The critic considered the metaphor of the science of crisis, which refers to the revolution, to be central to the novel. According to Bould, the "gorgeous and vile, powerful and corrupt" New Crobuzon is difficult to separate from the structure of the work. According to the critic, London is presented as steampunk, its description also reflects the modern "dark days" of the Thatcher, Major, and Blair era. According to Bould, the author's "obsessive inventiveness" is comparable to the imagination of William Gibson and Bruce Sterling; in the spirit of Neal Stephenson, the author strives to touch on everything possible. According to the critic, the book corresponds to the best examples of Dick's prose, but "without Dick's misogyny and straightforward certainty of moral rightness". According to Bould, the "gorgeous and corrupt images" are reminiscent of the images of Elizabeth Hand, Storm Constantine, and Poppy Z. Brite, but freed from the "saccharine and immersive effect".

Andrew Butler

Andrew Butler believed that the novel mixes elements of fantasy and science fiction. For example, the train station itself—both a real place and a metaphor—is difficult to imagine within the framework of fantasy, although the city map, giant spiders, and the summoning of demons allude to this genre. Isaac turns to the scientific method and uses Charles Babbage's difference engine, and he owns a robot vacuum cleaner. According to the critic, Miéville, in mixing genres, follows M. John Harrison and Mervyn Peake, and in the reflections on human nature in the final third of the novel, Butler saw a closeness to the themes of Philip K. Dick, from whom the epigraph is taken. According to Butler, the novel departs far from the tradition of Tolkien and C.S. Lewis; the author does not sing the praises of a lost England or London; As the critic noted, the book has "no elves, no singing around campfires, no happy endings"—the characters face real problems and dangers, they have different worldviews, and the protagonist is repeatedly forced to make moral choices that are not always correct and have consequences. Butler noted that the city's "crowded and unwashed streets" are always located not too far from the river and "are filled with curiosities and deformities, revolutionaries and spies". Butler praised the novel's style, thanks to which the entire world is described "easily and elegantly," and the accelerated pace of the narrative does not interfere with the author's digressions, the depiction of details, or the inner world of the characters.

Tom Arden

Tom Arden, noting elements of science fiction, considered the "grotesque, gothic" novel a striking example of "inventive and extravagant fantasy" and compared the work's genre to cyberpunk. The critic had no doubt about the success of the "big, bold, and ambitious" book. New Crobuzon, according to Arden, is depicted impressively, with a detail and completeness rare in fantasy; at the same time, the author avoids explanations and does not overload the reader with unnecessary information. Despite the considerable length of the novel, the action develops dynamically from the first page. According to Arden, as the plot develops, "strangeness develops into an orgy of perverse, harsh, dark grotesqueness", although the excess of the fantastic sets in motion the law of diminishing returns. Among the shortcomings of the work, Arden named a false idea of life in the city: the author sees in it only squalor, whereas any large city consists of contrasts, "filth and beauty, squalor and splendor, poverty and wealth"; the characters speak like London workers. Arden felt that the city dominated both the characters and the plot, which were secondary to New Crobuzon.

Rosanna Rabinowitz

Author Rosanna Rabinowitz praised the novel, saying that the author managed to use traditional fantasy elements to create a vibrant and unique work that "raises political and philosophical questions in an engaging way". Like King Rat, the novel deals with the marginalized and the outcast; according to the critic, the book is reminiscent of the early work of Samuel Delany (The Fall of the Towers), supplemented with Brechtian bitterness. Cops and thieves are indistinguishable from each other, and precarious alliances are formed and then broken. According to Rabinowitz, Miéville’s text "exudes decay, darkness, and at the same time vitality". Elements of fantasy—fairytale creatures (primarily a powerful spider) or unfamiliar landscapes—are combined with the very real experiences and problems of the “heroes,” who do not receive a reward for their ordeals. Rabinowitz was critical of the "disgusting" moths, whose appearance disrupts the overall tone of the work, creating an excess of "slime" and "pus," coarseness, and cruelty. She believed that battles with them "often detach from the intricate plot, replete with eloquent details." The critic praised the dramatic and unexpected ending.

Faren Miller

Author and Locus magazine columnist Faren Miller noted the blend of science fiction and dark fantasy, believing the novel to be more reminiscent of a steampunk version of Dante. The critic described the book as "a Dante fable for industrial times, from Dickens to the present day, with its cybernetics, astrophysics, and big business". The critic described New Crobuzon as a nightmarish metamorphosis of London, "a vast realm of metal, darkness, rivets, and pollution," filled with vileness and cruelty, and rife with industrial magic. Miller felt that the literary similes in the city's descriptions at times seemed intrusive, and the style became pretentious, even while remaining down-to-earth. Miller wrote that the novel contained "joy, tragedy, and extraordinary achievements of the mind," examining "justice, self-esteem, and much, much more."

John Clute

John Clute (Note: In his "Excessive Candour" column for the online magazine Science Fiction Weekly in issue 161, 22 May 2000.) considered the book the best steampunk novel since Gibson and Sterling's The Difference Engine and praised New Crobuzon—"[as] a vast, seething metropolis… a nightmarish parody of London or Paris"—as "a stunning creation." According to the critic, it contains everything that is necessary for such a city. Clute found it difficult to define the genre of the novel, a “thing in itself” that transcends classification. The critic noted features of fantasy, science fiction, and, to a greater extent, horror/dark fantasy. Thus, fantasy is indicated by the magic that Miéville makes scientific, and the moral purification of most of the main characters, who undergo severe trials. The novel is close to horror or dark fantasy in its plot about the invasion of monsters that threaten the very existence of the world; in the spirit of horror, the novel is rather "drowned" in "disgusting bodily fluids and secretions". At the same time, according to Clute, the novel can be considered science fiction to the extent that it tells about “possible transformations… in possible worlds". Clute noted that the author could have shortened the novel, which contains difficult-to-read passages with an excess of "short, fragmented, vivid" phrases. At these moments, the author's style becomes cocky and eccentric, attempting to describe the "clunking, sugar-coated, restless, overcrowded" city. As the plot reaches its climax, the narration rises in a "hoarse voice"; Clute noted that, despite the loudness, horror, and mirth, the novel contains glimpses of tomorrow's faces: "dirty, sad, and laughing, real and false".

Javier Martínez

Literary critic Javier Martínez noted elements of science fiction (aliens, unfamiliar landscapes, artificial intelligence) and fantasy and horror (pre-industrial and medieval cultural symbols, vampires), but felt that the question of genre distracts from the book's main content—a reflection on hybrid culture. Martinez described the work as a phantasmagoria and a "hybrid narrative." He believes that the author has succeeded in exploring the "hybrid zone" (referred to by Mr. Motley in the novel), a theme that is significant for speculative fiction in the 21st century: themes of gender, sexuality, and class are touched upon even when discussing the use and abuse of technology and political power. According to Martinez, the novel's world reflects the contradictory situation of Third World countries, making the book quite relevant; Miéville shows how "pockets of technology and innovation" are embedded in a reality of "underdeveloped infrastructure and cultural backwardness".

James Sallis

The English reviewer James Sallis assessed the novel as brilliant, a kind of gem; the critic noted that Miéville mixes many genres and treats the previous tradition of fantastic literature with reverence. According to the critic, the book, without being quite either science fiction or fantasy, includes elements of high fantasy and harsh realism, a love story and gothic horror, adventure and intrigue; at the same time, there is nothing new in the book. According to Sallis, the novel unusually combines medieval and modern technologies, incredible social coverage and attention to the individual. Sallis saw similarities with the early works of Alfred Bester with his large number of ideas and noted echoes of the work of Philip Farmer and M. Peake; the theme of social responsibility and the image of the city as an independent entity refer to Moorcock; The novel's romantic yearning, frustration, and despair allude to the works of Harrison.

Sylvie Burigana

Critic Sylvie Burigana noted the young writer's extraordinary skill in creating a world that feels familiar and immediately captivates. Yagharek's peculiar "diary," which opens the novel, seems "wordy, labored, a little confused", but, according to the critic, subtly reveals the psychology of the garuda. Burigan characterized the author's style as restrained, "always... loaded, saturated with adjectives, periphrases, parenthetical phrases, and descriptive digressions". This redundancy, according to the critic, reflects the "swarming, sticky, viscous, nauseating quality" of New Crobuzon, but the text remains quite readable. Despite the "viscous" nature of the text, the means of expression used are rather economical. The author introduces bizarre images smoothly, the dialogues are meaningful without being too drawn out, and the characters are individual. The critic noted the humanity and appeal of the characters, who belong to different races, with their "ideals, naivety, absurdities, and vices". The author, creating the image of a decaying city at the beginning of the novel and making several allusions to its past (including the "new" in the title), rejects environmentalism or catastrophism, as well as the genre of the roman à clef. According to Burigana, the emphasis is on human drama, accompanied by humor. The novel contains a lot of cruelty; the author is merciless to the reader, which distinguishes the work from the "vulgar" feuilleton novels of Eugène Sue and Lerouge, although there is some similarity with them. According to the critic, the egoism and aspirations of the heroes are linked into a common Fate, the image of which is embodied by Weaver, reminiscent of the moirai Clotho (the spinner) and the Pythia. In the critic's summary, the novel is a "complex but charming mixture"; the narrative "swells, confuses, sometimes "goes off the rails," but still touches the soul." As Burigana concluded, to fully appreciate the novel, one must enter this universe, this city, like Yagharek, who, after his fall and long search, enters New Crobuzon "as a man".

Nick Rennison, Stephen Andrews, Damien Broderick, Paul Di Filippo, Stefanie Brösicke, Sven-Erik Wehmeyer

Novelists Nick Rennison and Stephen Andrews have noted that, if the author's world is to be considered possible, its politics, power, and ethnography seem undeniably authentic. Novelists Damien Broderick and Paul Di Filippo believed that the extraordinary technological achievements mixed with magic make the "attractive, repulsive" New Crobuzon an original parody of the Victorian era, and defined the novel as a phantasmagoria. Critic Stefanie Brösicke found New Crobuzon to be the true hero of the novel about a "city without beginning or end"; the book, like the city, contains a multitude of "whimsical characters, captivating stories, and fantastic adventures" that form a "unique overall picture". According to the critic, the novel creates both new content and a new style, while simultaneously providing excellent entertainment. Critic Sven-Erik Wehmeyer noted the uniqueness and integrity of the author's alternative fantasy world with a Victorian history based on steampunk; Miéville does not adhere to any particular genre or mix genres. Wehmeyer praised the abundance of ideas and images, and the skillful use of language—elements that, in his words, form a "grandiose narrative". According to the critic, the novel, written by a Marxist scholar who follows politics, brings novelty to “engaged” or “socially critical” prose.

== Analysis ==
=== Genre features and ideological connections ===
A debate has erupted among critics and academic scholars regarding the novel's genre, its "unclassifiable"[nature] and its leftist ideological leanings. The genre has been defined as science fiction, fantasy (urban fantasy), horror, steampunk, or "weird fiction"; features of surrealism, magical realism, as well as urban realism and action-adventure fiction have been noted.

Critics have noted numerous sources of inspiration, most notably Harrison's Viriconium cycle and Mervyn Peake's Gormenghast. The character of New Crobuzon was influenced by the depiction of London in Tim Powers's The Anubis Gates, as well as by descriptions of the city in the works of Dickens, Conrad and Chesterton. Other possible sources include the worlds of Leiber's Lankhmar and Aldiss's Malacia, Delany's novel Dhalgren, Terry Pratchett's Discworld, Michael Swanwick's The Iron Dragon's Daughter, Mary Gentle's Rats and Gargoyles, Gibson and Sterling's The Difference Engine (from which the Council of Constructs is taken, in the science fiction tradition of HAL 9000 in 2005), the works of H. P. Lovecraft, Alfred Bester, Philip Farmer, Philip Dick, M. Moorcock, Gene Wolfe, the film Brazil, and Wagner's Der Ring des Nibelungen. M. Bould found references to Jonathan Swift, Ursula Le Guin, and Lewis Carroll's Jabberwocky. The mayor's name is an allusion to Jeremy Bentham. The author himself provided an impressive list, including British children's programmes of the 1970s and 1980s, the films The Matrix and Prince of Darkness, the Alien series, the works of the brothers Quay and Jan Švankmajer, surrealists Max Ernst and Hans Bellmer, modern artists M. C. Escher, Jean-Michel Basquiat, Chris Ware, Burne Hogarth, and others. Miéville mentioned Jane Eyre, The Yellow Wallpaper, The Gates of Anubis, and The Malacia Tapestry; The influence of these works has been considered less obvious by literary scholar Joan Gordon. At the same time, the author distanced himself from The Lord of the Rings, whose "moralistic, abstract logic" downplayed political complexity; Miéville categorically disagreed with Tolkien's notion of fantasy as "consolation," although he acknowledged its revolutionary role in "constructing a coherent secondary world." (Note: The "Secondary World" is a term introduced by Tolkien in his seminal essay "On Fairy Stories".) Miéville commented on the writing of the novel:

I was quite consciously trying to do a non-Tolkienesque fantasy . . . I kind of made a checklist: Tolkien is rural and bucolic, so let’s make it urban and shitty; Tolkien is feudalism lite, so let’s make it capitalism dark, and you go through like that.

The novel does not express nostalgia for a lost past. Literary scholar William Burling associated the novel with a new form of fantasy, "radical fantasy," a response to the development of global capitalism at the turn of the 20th and 21st centuries. Birling identified three innovative features of the novel that distinguished it from previous fantasy. First, the novel "literally, without allegory, and through cognitive defamiliarization" shows "the economic exploitation and ideological mystification under industrial capitalism"; it realistically describes the harsh working conditions and alienation of the proletariat (dock workers, butchers, laborers, and the unemployed), which includes both humans and other races. Secondly, the constructed world is not based on a Manichaean opposition of good and evil, but is shown historically—materialism and dialectic replace idealism and metaphysics. The novel emphasizes the “unstable, cruel, artless, and repressive political environment” of the city, showing “the decay of the ruling class and its pocket political parties,” and the cruelty of both the police and the criminal underworld. The Devil is not a metaphysical authority, and his minions are no different from the authorities of New Crobuzon; the relations between the two worlds are entirely material, commodity-monetary in nature. The ambassador of Hell appears as an “overworked bureaucrat” and calls New Crobuzon “neighbors.” As Burling wrote, none of this presupposes the existence of a “good” god. Finally, according to Burling, the book differs from the "restrictive mystifications of traditional fantasy," which focus on metaphysics, fatalism, or an idealized past with its "higher and universal 'values and traditions'" (as in the works of Tolkien or Kenneth Grahame) as an alternative to dehumanization and commodification. The novel offers not nostalgia, resignation, or individual rebellion, but collective class political action on the part of the oppressed who have previously been excluded from it; this progressive action is directed toward the future.

The novel has been characterized by M. Bould as "a science fiction story in a fantasy 'secondary' world." Bas-Lag's connection to Earth is unclear; it could be either an alternate Earth or another planet. According to literary scholars Keith Booker and Anne-Marie Thomas, the different species are more reminiscent of science fiction aliens than fantasy creatures, although Bas-Lag has similarities with fantasy worlds such as Tolkien's Middle-earth. As Friedman noted, Bas-Lag is perceived as a vast world with its own geography: with different countries and their histories, with "oceans, deserts, and New Crobuzon's military and trade relations with its competitors." Miéville describes many areas of human activity, which, according to Friedman, is rare in the fantasy genre: power, the state, and the economy; housing, transportation, energy; scientific and bohemian environments; philosophical ideas, religious and sexual practices; political radicals, law enforcement, various types of crime, etc.

According to Booker and Thomas, the book's hybridity is typical of postmodern literature; Hybridity and diversity are celebrated, but due to the author's socialist views, they are not ends in themselves: diversity is not seen as an absolute good that necessarily leads to emancipation (for example The Council of Constructions), but in the absence of unity, on the contrary, it can be harmful, divisive, and result in oppression. The author emphasizes the importance of group solidarity and the value of unity within diversity. As Booker and Thomas have written, the novel allegorically points to racism in Western societies, where other races are present under white supremacy. Literary scholar Justin Cosner has placed the novel in line with works such as Le Guin's The Lathe of Heaven and Vonnegut's Harrison Bergeron, which criticize (Note: This critique is broader than the reactionary narratives of the Cold War (communist collectivism versus capitalist individualism)) the political elimination of differences and forced equality as threatening individual subjectivity.

=== Narrative Structure. City and Characters ===
The novel's narrative structure is characterized as networked and multilayered. In addition to the main action-adventure plot, significant subplots include Lin's story and the attempts to rescue her, Yagharek's entire arc and his relationship with Isaac, and Derhan's plot about a quasi-Marxist revolutionary movement aimed at overthrowing capitalism and dictatorship in the city. Numerous smaller subplots are connected to Isaac.] The author uses two types of narrative. The main body of the novel is built around heterodiegetic narrators. Most often, the focalizer is the protagonist, Isaac, and sometimes Lin, Derhan, and Mayor Rudgutter; all of these narrators are local residents. Another type, homodiegetic narration is used at the beginning, the ending, and in a few other places (ten times in total), when the reader sees the city through Yagharek's eyes (internal focalization). As literary scholar Raphael Zähringer has noted, Yagharek is an outsider, and this technique, classic in science fiction, allows the reader to become familiar with the fictional world and become accustomed to it. The narrative modes are opposed to each other and, according to Zähringer, combine "closeness and distance, particularization and totalization", (Note: Introduced by Hegel, Totalization in literary theory describe how unconnected and disparate phenomena can be understood within a larger totality.) the gaze of a passer-by and a view "from above." The voices of Yagharek and Weaver interrupt the usual linear narrative. Weaver speaks in verse and allusions, his stream of consciousness recalls Dadaism and the language of Finnegans Wake. Although The Weaver can be partially understood from the context, the meaning always remains uncertain and depends on free associations, metaphors and metonymies. According to literary scholar Alexandre Veloso de Abreu, the author, who rejects any escapism and links politics and fantasy, turns to a narrative strategy that includes allegorical symbols and metaphors, archetypes, references to mythology and history. This strategy largely excludes contextualization, the narrator does not visit most of the places, which, however, gives the city depth. According to Friedman, although Miéville follows Dickens and Conan Doyle, the structure of the novel differs from the narrative structure of his predecessors (in which the main plot line is secondary to many subplots, characters and details), since the plot about the moths occupies the primary place. The novel's central point is, to some extent, the railway station, where the denouement takes place, although it is barely mentioned throughout the narrative.

At the heart of the novel is the image of New Crobuzon, a kind of urban Gormenghast, a hybrid city that allegorically represents London, perhaps in the distant future. This Dickensian quasi-Victorian London is altered and distorted. The author describes the city's structures in detail, mostly in dark and oppressive tones. New Crobuzon is located at the confluence of two rivers that divide the city, like the River Thames. According to Veloso de Abreu, the dock area with its watermen and ships towed by worms alludes to the area east of Tower Bridge in the late 19th century. According to literary scholar Hadas Elber-Aviram, the novel follows Dickens's Bleak House in its presentation of the city as a "melting pot" of "the powerful and the dispossessed". The city has features of modern Cairo and the older parts of New Orleans, as well as Harrison's Viriconium, combining development and archaism, sophistication and decay. Gordon has characterized New Crobuzon as an exaggerated metaphor for the hybridity of modern large cities.

According to Burling, the city is not a metaphor but a metonymy that helps Miéville (like Dickens) to expose and critique "the unrepresentable capitalist totality"; New Crobuzon does not simply serve as a "backdrop" for the plot, but is the source of the narrative. The inhabitants cannot see the whole of New Crobuzon and always interpret it in their own way. As Burling has suggested, Yagharek tries to make sense of the city as a whole, (Note: "...a design embodied in bone and stone, a complex web of hard labor and violence, a symbol of fattened domination, resting in the depths of history".) and his inability to perceive space reflects Fredric Jameson's formulation of the "devastating inability" to think politically in the postmodern era. As Veloso de Abreu has noted, the city's inhabitants are constantly marginalized by each other and by the city itself, which pushes them to the outskirts and poor areas, but in a way that the khepri, for example, do not notice. The city ultimately absorbs Yagharek, an outsider who initially tries to avoid the outskirts by not accepting marginal life. According to literary scholar Robert Wood, the city is clearly constructed as a hybrid body, the product of assemblages in which the organic and the inorganic, architecture and biology, are mixed in a historical dimension; the history of technology and social struggle constitute the history of racialization. The history of New Crobuzon as a post-imperial space is characterized by colonial violence and plunder, immigration flows, suppressed rebellions. According to political scientist Robert Saunders, the image of unwanted immigrants and marginalized minorities is embodied by the khepri, a race of "traders and travelers" for whom New Corbuzon became an unrealized Zion: in addition to ghettoization and limited rights, the Desolation and subsequent deprivations openly point to all the historical traumas of the Jewish diaspora, from antiquity to the pogroms in the Russian Empire and the Holocaust.

The protagonists of the novel are outsiders. Their characters (Lin, Lemuel, Isaac, Derkhan), according to Zähringer, mostly do not go beyond the framework of classic dystopias in which outsiders fail (Zamyatin's We). Thus, Lin is an outcast both among the khepri and among humans. The exception is Yagharek, an outsider both among the garuda and in New Crobuzon: he eventually manages to transform himself and become human. The formation of the characters is determined by the constant processes of “individualization and totalization” (in Michel Foucault ’s terms) The dark-skinned Isaac belongs to a privileged species, culture, and gender—his image, according to Veloso de Abreu, refers to the white man, to European imperialism, to Rudyard Kipling’s "white man’s burden". Isaac’s discouragement when the garuda chief rejects the possibility of cooperation reflects the dissatisfied reaction of the dominant majority, which tries to help minorities but is met with hostility; similarly, the hero’s relationship with Yagharek resembles the attempt of the dominant group to solve the problems of minorities. Veloso de Abreu noted mythological and other allusions. Thus, Lin and her race go through a transformation - the ancient Egyptian beetle-headed god Khepri symbolized creation, resurrection, transformation; the image of Yagharek, searching for his identity, refers to the bird of prey as a symbol of freedom and victory, to the ancient Egyptian sun god (Note: Literary scholar Andrew Rayment wrote about the Garuda birds from Hindu mythology.) who was depicted with the head of a falcon - the garuda seems majestic and powerful to Isaac, but does not look like it; the cacti, who adapt and survive in the inhospitable city, refer to cacti, which embody resilience and, in some way, resistance. According to Veloso de Abreu, the Weaver—a delirious computer and a deus ex machina—allegorically refers to the writing of a text and the construction of a narrative (the researcher mentioned the myth of Arachne from Ovid's Metamorphoses); web-weaving is associated with cunning and simultaneously points to the dominant discourse. According to Wood, the figure of Isaac is contradictory: his relationship with his former boss, Vermishank, is ambiguous, involving both sympathies and antipathies, but they are united by a passion for science and its creative possibilities; he wants access to the laboratory and therefore remains dependent on Vermishank, which Wood interprets as cynicism. Isaac is a product of the history of the city with its patriarchy, appropriation of nature, and dubious notions of progress, and at the same time an outsider, a figure of resistance.

=== Capitalism and Capitalist Monsters ===
According to literary scholar Carl Freedman the "semi-fascist authoritarianism" of New Crobuzon likely combines features of Victorian parliamentary system's and 1930s fascism; it is a capitalism with neo-Victorian and neo-fascist elements. Literary scholar Christopher Kendrick has suggested that Miéville's world alludes not only to the era of mercantilism but also to contemporary financialization, and has identified two differences between the author's world and the actual history of capitalism. First, New Crobuzon is an empire aiming for expansion with undefined borders; in Bas-Lag, provinces and regions predominate, rather than nation-states. Second, in Miéville's world, technology is more closely associated with human power and the body.

The Moths, monsters reminiscent of the Aliens, are the author's answer to Lovecraft's Cthulhu and are comparable to them; according to Freedman, they are among the most terrifying monsters in modern fantasy. The Moths are described as being "taller than a bear" with "writhing cartilaginous appendages like dark whips" protruding from their sides. The Moths have three distinct pairs of legs, a pointed tail, and "enormous, irregularly shaped wings." In place of eyes, they have two "deep sockets" from which grow "thick, flexible antennae, like short, fat fingers over massive bars of teeth". Using a huge, "sensitive, grasping tongue," they drain the mind from the head of their victim. Moths appear as modern versions of vampires, with nothing human about them. As cultural theorist Steven Shaviro has noted, one cannot empathize with them, like Dracula, but can only be their victim. According to Freedman, moths are not, however, evil in the ethical sense (unlike Sauron, Saruman, and other Tolkien villains); they are beyond moral choice and simply exist, like Cthulhu.

Shaviro considered moths to be "capitalist monsters," whose "greed and insatiability" allegorically express the vampiric nature of capital, the process of its self-reproduction; moths transform intellectual capital into a real commodity. As Freedman wrote, the moths' "destructive gluttony" is supra-individual, like property relations under conditions of commodity production. According to Shaviro, in this vampire and zombie economy, the latter are transformed from alienated workers into exhausted (non-renewable) sources of value; they are consumed and discarded. The moth economy is not new to New Crobuzon: in its uncontrolled spread, like a cancer, capitalist processes are merely intensified. In Shaviro's words, it is a "nightmare of the mad appropriation of surplus value"; the monsters embody "capitalism… with an inhuman face." The instability of this system reflects the instability inherent in capitalism; in Shaviro's words, it "will expand exponentially and come to an apocalyptic collapse once all the possible loot in the city… has been consumed." As Freedman wrote, the question is about the scarcity of resources (the contradiction between infinite demand and finite supply), both in New Crobuzon and throughout Bas-Lag. Freedman developed Shaviro's approach, finding a reference to post-industrial capitalism, with its service sector, which practices the replaceability of unskilled workers and their part-time employment. For Freedman, the moths embody the opposite of the peaceful love in the first chapter: absolute domination and the erasure of any differences between rational beings. Booker and Thomas metaphorically compared the immobilization of the victims by the moths to the mechanisms of bourgeois ideology described by Gramsci and Althusser: the voluntary adoption of the bourgeois worldview as one's own. According to Kendrick, the image of the moths reflects the "mind industry" (in the terms of the Frankfurt School). The Council of Constructs was also viewed as capital as self-expanding value, which Gordon considered God at the head of religious forces, distinguishing it from the "fascist and capitalist" state and the "unbridled capitalist" mafia of the remade.

Kendrick wrote that the novel examines the impact of two centuries of capitalist development on the "magical narrative of the romantic genre" and presents new images of "hope and terror" that reflect the social contradictions of capitalism—past, present, and future. The author tests this thesis using a "strategy of symbolic overload": the novel is "overloaded" with monsters. Miéville "comparatively maps, tests, and expands" many fantasy conventions, revising them and attempting to overcome the speculative nature of social allegory. The images of monsters have a class connotation, and the "postmodern" theme of hybridity is clearly located within the logic of class differences. Kendrick noted the duality of the theme of monster "overload" and the relationship to it: on the one hand, the abundance of monsters represents a problem of contemporary culture, on the other hand, in the accumulation of monsters (moths, the Weaver, the reworked remade and Jack-Half-Prayer, the Construct Council, the Crisis Machine) there is a class consciousness, which is visible at the plot level.

Thus, the plot of the moths is connected with social struggle, Isaac's alliance around the energy of the crisis can be interpreted as an alliance of the working class, in which class consciousness is awakening. Kendrick believed that the cultures of different species are not so different, and ethnicity and race do not entail social consequences: social classes and class struggle remain paramount due to the ubiquity of species differences. Robert Wood has examined the novel from the perspective of Immanuel Wallerstein's theory of the capitalist world-system and post-operaist theorists Paolo Virno and Antonio Negri, who analyzed the post-Fordist affective economy, (Note: According to Virno, this new mode of production follows a logic of contingency and multiplicity, in which fragmented forms of resistance are possible, and collaboration and creativity (involved in communicative and affective labor) are used for exploitation.) based on opportunism, fear, and cynicism, in a state of instability and uncertainty. Miéville shows the evolution of the world-system over the last fifty years—since the collapse of the New Left movements of the 1960s and 1970s and the rise of neoliberal capitalism with its fragmented and flexible structure of production since the mid-1970s. (Note: According to Wood, the "suspended revolution" after 1968 combined the collapse of trade unions, social protection, and social movements with the absence of a counterrevolutionary victory, the gradual decline of the United States, and a state of equilibrium or stasis ("frozen dialectic").) The author reflects on the possibilities of social change, constructing the “complex, agonistic, and overdetermined space of the fictional city”—the main theme of the novel. According to Wood, the novel uses the means of fantasy and science fiction to show "a rich and complex history of forms of racialization, the production of gender, regimes of sexuality, histories of domination, resistance and transgression". According to Wood, the book does not show a way out of the structures of domination and consent, but it does describe a number of possibilities in this time perspective; the writer attempts to imagine a new anti-systemic politics within the framework of hybridity - a new site of social struggle in the postmodern era. The possibility of a way out is indicated by Virno's analysis: fear, opportunism and cynicism can turn against the system itself, making it vulnerable and unstable, while cooperation still creates new forms of life. Thus, the state of New Crobuzon and its militia, which relies only on brute force, are illegitimate. The authorities do not receive consent from the governed and do not control the destructive engines of accumulation (the moths) they have created, which embody the "pure forms of appropriation", capital in the postmodern era; The moths are destroyed by the Weaver and the power of cooperation. According to Wood, the balance is eventually restored, but in a modified form, a return to the old civil war.

=== Utopian Images: The Weaver's Aesthetics, Love, and the Garuda Community ===
The Weaver is the most anti-authoritarian image in the novel. According to literary academic Sandy Rankin, the image deviates from a rational narrative and challenges explanatory models in Marxism that analyze the failures of utopia from a rational perspective. The Weaver is described in psychoanalytic terms. He dreams that "he is conscious, and consciousness is his dream... a bottomless cauldron in which images, desires, thoughts, and emotions are boiled". He does not distinguish between the possible and the actual, between sleep and wakefulness. According to Rankin, the Weaver has no neuroses, repressed fears, or anger from childhood or historical trauma; In it, “desire, expectation, and the unscheduled fulfillment of desire” are combined with sadness, uncertainty, and vulnerability. The Weaver does not experience alienation from the outside world, which abolishes the division between “knowledge and emotion, epistemology and ontology, subject and object,” between historical reality and dreams of utopia and socialism. According to Rankin, Miéville is talking about, in Jameson’s words, an unchanging “revolutionary desire” that cannot be suppressed. The Weaver personifies the utopian impulse and revolutionary consciousness, the possibility of imagining an alternative to capitalism—a world without economic injustice. The figure of the Weaver, who enjoys the beauty of the web he has woven, symbolizes living labor freed from capital. According to Wood, the image of the Weaver refers to aesthetics, collaboration, madness, and production without instrumentality. The Weaver is feared by the city authorities; he is practically the only one who tries to stop the moths, but in the novel, unlike the latter, he remains a marginal figure.

Rankin noted that the Weaver can be interpreted as a crypto-fascist, due to the fascist aestheticization of politics: the Weaver's movements are shown as "slow, eerie, and utterly inhuman" and at the same time "eerily human... like those of a hypocritical, simpering priest"; according to ancient legends, the Weavers could kill each other due to aesthetic differences. According to Rankin, Weaver, as the God-artist, truly exists beyond good and evil in Nietzsche's sense, beyond any legends and ideologies, beyond capitalism—the profit motive, games, deals, capitalist temptations, and so on. In the real world, Weaver's aesthetic ontology could lead to an "aestheticization of violence, war, and death," which is impossible in Bas-Lag.

Freedman examined Isaac and Lin's love affair in the context of Theodor Adorno's concept of "peace" (the preservation of difference without domination) and the similar views of D. H. Lawrence. (Note: In Lady Chatterley's Lover, Lawrence wrote of the abstinence that "follows the fever of love, as peace follows war".) He believed that sex between a man and a woman provides "mutual inspiration" (Note: A term from John Donne.) and, more broadly, "a dynamic equilibrium of identity and difference." According to Freedman, the love between the characters is a mutual inspiration without domination and embodies a vision of utopia that is linked to the revolutionary struggle against capitalism. Freedman believes that the author has succeeded in overcoming the tropes of pulp science fiction, in which ordinary human sexuality is concealed in the guise of alien women: sex between Isaac and Lin represents a genuine erotic feeling (Lawrence's eros) and combines human experience with the non-human aspects of sex (Lin's wings). As Freedman noted, for most of the novel, the lovers are separated, indicating the tragic nature of their love; in the ending, eros is no longer possible, although true love can continue through Isaac's care for Lin.

Literary scholar Andrew Rayment has noted that the idea of the garuda community is aimed against one of the "sacred cows" of capitalism—its equation with individualism and, therefore, freedom; Miéville reconsiders the relationship between communism and the individual. The Garudas are "absolute egalitarians" and "communists", with "no sexual division of labor. No money, no ranks" and collective property. Rayment believed that Miéville elegantly solves the problem of limitations on free action: the Garuda society provides the individual with maximum choice, communism gives everyone "the opportunity to choose freely." Communist society turns out to be completely individualistic, where the only crime is to deny another person's individual choice. Freedman believes that the Garudas are Kantian Marxists, their society embodying Adorno's "world".

=== Hybridity ===
Joan Gordon has examined three interrelated aspects of the novel: hybridity (Note: The metaphor came to postcolonialism from biology.; the concept became key both for postcolonialism and for the construction of utopia and dystopia.) heterotopia and comradeship. For Gordon, the novel takes the metaphor of hybridity (a property shared by both real London and the contemporary world) literally, through its "fantastically hybrid inhabitants" and "fantastically sprawling city. Gordon interprets the novel as a meditation on hybridity and as a hybrid—a blending of genres and traditions, the "offspring" of disparate "parents". Miéville has acknowledged that it is a hybrid between Harrison's Viriconium, who is a representative of the new wave and RPGs (Note: Dungeons & Dragons.) Hybridity is present at all levels of the text, affecting characters, the city (particularly remade ones, including Mr Motley), politics, language, and other aspects. Literary scholar Jessica Langer described three interconnected dimensions in which hybridity is embodied—body, consciousness, and the city. Langer defined these dimensions as sites of transgression. Zähringer interpreted hybridity as a bodily transgression in which the body not only crosses things or geographical boundaries, but itself has boundaries and is a boundary. He argued that the three dimensions described by Langer point to a close connection between hybridity and dystopia as evident in the character type typical of dystopia—the outsider.

Gordon followed linguistic anthropologist Brian Stross in defining cultural hybrid as a metaphor for a person, culture, or cultural element that incorporates heterogeneous traits from different sources, cultures, or traditions. She drew attention to the concepts of "hybrid power" and the "hybrid cycle." Thus, the khepri race originated as a hybrid, although by the time the novel takes place in the world of New Crobuzon, it has become "pure-bred". The artwork that Lin creates, adding novelty to the traditional high art of the khepri, embodies the "hybrid power" of mutual cultural influence. The author uses a metaphor, turning the biological model into a cultural one. Gordon examined hybridity through the example of how Isaac perceives Lin: the fact of the biological differences between them disgusts him, but he is attracted to Lin; Gordon noted that Isaac (like the reader) moves from a feeling of disgust through repression to acceptance of Lin and a feeling of desire. Gordon associated this transition with two stages of the "hybrid cycle": hybridity and "pure-bredness". Lin is presented as both grotesque and beautiful at the same time; Gordon linked this duality to the nature of the grotesque, (Note: The grotesque follows from the impossibility of accepting the unusual, that which causes disgust (deviations from the norm) or, on the contrary, is strongly attractive (ideal forms), but in both cases goes beyond the categories of reason.) which is significant for modernist and postmodernist literature. In Lin's case, the grotesque is postmodern, since in postmodernism, unlike modernism, deviation is considered normal. According to Gordon, the author develops the idea of a "normative grotesque". Hybridity is recognized by Mr. Motley who calls the city a "hybrid zone," "a zone in which something separate becomes part of a whole." Popourri speaks of transition, "the point at which one turns into another," the basis of the structure of the world, the city, and all its inhabitants; the city repeats the cycle of the hybrid. Due to its total hybridity, The Remade has been identified by critics with New Crobuzon or Bas-Lag—a unique place made up of many disparate parts.

According to Freedman, the author's "politics of dialectical hybridity", embodied above all in the love between Isaac and Lin, opposes postmodern pastiche (in Jameson's terms). Here, an example is Mr. Motley, whose body is a hodgepodge of different parts, in Freedman's words, "a grotesque orgy of heterogeneity". According to Freedman, Mr Motley, who has remade himself, reveals yet another version of the "capitalist monster" (in Shaviro's terms) with the appearance of hybridity; all of Mr Motley's body parts are literally commodities due to the costly remaking. According to Freedman, this case, unlike the moths, depicts capitalist commodity production in its postmodern phase (F. Jameson), rather than in Marx's era: the image of Mr Motley reflects the ubiquity of capital's presence on the planet, the difficulty of perceiving capitalism as a whole. Freedman states that the theory of crisis energy—thanks to which enormous kinetic energy is generated and "capitalist monsters" are defeated—affirms ontological instability, the contradictory nature of reality and presupposes the hybridity of being. This dynamism, a dialectic in the spirit of György Lukács (or Friedrich Engels's "dialectics of nature") is contrasted with statics and totalization—the pastiche of remade. Isaac's victory over the monsters points to a victory over capitalism, which, however, can only be allegorical, since it does not entail revolutionary changes, but merely maintains the status quo: the Rudgutter state at the end of the novel remains intact and even retains its strength. As Kendrick noted, the crisis energy encompasses not only society and history, but also nature, although it remains unclear what the crisis machine (the structure of which is based on pseudoscientific postulates, on the idea of dialectics) does. The machine certainly cannot control the course of history.

In a polemical analysis of Freedman and Gordon, Wood considered their interpretations to be simplistic: the accidental alliance of Isaac and his friends is contrasted with the moths, the authorities, and their counterpart in the criminal underworld, the remade gang; the united proletariat is idealized, and hybridity is linked to marginality, cooperation, and creativity. Wood argues that the critics do not take into account the contradictions and antagonisms, racial conflict in the novel. He sees hybridity, due to its ubiquity, as no longer a marker of resistance, but defines the center and the periphery, exploiters and exploited. Hybridity is the main feature of the state institutions of New Crobuzon. Polemicizing with Freedman's thesis on the commodity, Wood wrote that the plurality and hybridity of The Remade, which has voluntarily remade itself and speaks with one voice, do not lead to resistance or to radical politics. Mr Motley is both a serious postmodern critic and a brutal criminal who turns hybridity into capital. For Wood, the unstable and purely physical relationship between Isaac and Lin, which Freedman idealizes, does not go beyond the racialist framework of sexuality. Wood, criticizing Gordon's analysis, noted elements of discomfort, danger, and potential conflict in the characters' relationship—for example, Lin is frustrated by Isaac's failure to declare their relationship openly. Wood found radical egalitarianism in everyday episodes of cooperation; the relationship between Isaac and Lin truly represents a line of escape from domination and has political significance, undermining the hierarchical structures of the city.

=== Remade and 'technoscience' ===
Gordon believed that the remade are removed from the biological model of hybridity, being not genetic hybrids but rather cyborgs in the interpretation of Donna Haraway, and possibly embody a new stage of punishment and crime in the sense of Foucault's 'history of the body' (Body theory). Unlike Lin, the remade remain outside the norm and are not, like the khepri, a homogeneous group, but resemble Frankenstein's monster i.e only one of their own kind; this is a vivid example of the grotesque. Gordon noted the commodification of the body, the metaphor of the woman as a sexual object. Saunders pointed out that the commercialization of the remade for prostitution connects capitalism, consumerism, and crime. Jessica Langer, noting the similarity of the city's 'vertical' stratification to Fritz Lang's Metropolis wrote that the remade, who work in underground punitive factories, resemble the underground workers from the film.

Andrew Rayment has noted several possibilities for political expression through the image of the remade, the fantasy equivalent of the constructed subject. Remaking, when the body becomes socio-political, can be understood as prolonged retribution, justice in the spirit of an eye for an eye; the essence of punishment turns out to be cruelty. The body is reduced to a signifier (Foucault) and points to a criminal act; the body can also act as a medium of communication (Marshall McLuhan). Furthermore, the image allows for a critique of the foundations of capitalism, its logic of dehumanization: man, the “subject-sign” (the remade-workers) is reduced to utility, to an economic function, to what man does. According to Rayment, the logic of Foucault’s biopower is evident here: the state is interested only in the productivity of individuals; Miéville criticizes the idea that human bodies belong to the state. Finally, according to Rayment, the most significant connection is to Giorgio Agamben's homo sacer: those remade by the decision of sovereign power (the paradigm of Western power, according to Agamben) are excluded from the political body of New Crobuzon and reduced to bare life. Those remade represent, in Rayment's words, "refuse, garbage, excrement—the excrement of sovereign power"; the penal factories clearly allude to the Nazi "death factories," for which the philosopher introduced the concept of homo sacer.

Wood characterized the system of magic as a "disciplinary superstructure" that is rationalized, instrumentalized, and becomes indistinguishable from science. This "technoscience" marks and transforms biological material (the body), creating racialization, and at the same time becomes a source of crisis. Creative “technoscience” is a cultural dominant, completely absorbing the creative potential of the multitude (labor; in Virno’s terms), erasing the distinction between revolutionary energy and the state of oppression. As Wood noted, the remade is a figure of the unsalvageable, he always inspires disgust. At the same time, in the affective economy, punishment produces surplus value (the commercial exploitation of the remade). The remade evoke hatred and the fear of becoming the same, an opportunistic desire to assert one’s superiority over the disgusting remade; hence, cynicism. Thus, the encounter with the remade, depicting the garuda, points to “the voyeurism of journalistic ‘exposés’, which combines the pleasure of spectacle and the moralizing mask.” According to Wood, the act of remaking produces and marks the army of the unemployed as a "universally hated class"—it is both "the naked force of the state" and "a mode of abhorrent alterity." Wood noted the reflection of the logic of modernity: the shift in punishment points to the collapse of the logic of the prison (Foucault), which, like the criminal's body, is no longer considered a site of emancipation. According to Wood, Isaac's project of new science, in contrast to "technoscience," points to a radically different future and science and is linked to social change through the development of contradictions to the point of crisis. As Wood noted, the combination of descriptiveness and prescriptiveness brings Isaac's project closer to Marxism.

=== Heterotopia ===
Gordon suggested considering the city not so much as a dystopia, but as a heterotopia (Note: The concept introduced by Michel Foucault, who defined heterotopia as a real 'counter-site', differing from utopias – 'places without a real place'.) based on two of its types identified by Foucault: the heterotopia of deviation and the heteropy of crisis. For Miéville, heterotopia is the product of a particular dialectic, during which one place, in opposition to another place, through feedback generates a new place - "a hybrid that generates a new cycle of dialectic". The city is transformed from separate parts into a place "in constant motion, highly adaptive and heterogeneous". Miéville rejects a static approach in favor of dynamics, believing that "modernity, history, is always-already in a state of transition". Crisis energy - "the energy of heterotopia" - has a similar dynamic. Gordon believed that this dialectic attempts to reconcile modernism, which tends toward totalization, with postmodernist diffusion, frees modernism from totalitarianism.

An example of a crisis heterotopia that opposes heterotopias of deviation is the Griss Twist—a dump, a place of refuse and garbage. While in Foucault, crisis heterotopias disappear and transform into heterotopias of deviation (psychiatric clinics, prisons), in Miéville, on the contrary, machines in a situation of crisis transform from deviants into a single and powerful intelligence of the Construct Council. The Council forms a "social and historical whole," connecting with other machines and people, and at the same time serving as a "repository of the history of constructions." Analogously to Foucault's heterotopia, the Council "is linked to the 'opening up' of time"; This heterotopia of crisis, like a museum or a library, "contains all times, all eras, in one space." Researcher Tim Miller considered this characterization too positive, noting the totalitarian nature of the Council of Constructs, a clearly "bad" monster that has abandoned its own revolutionary and anarchic origins and is a will without purpose; it promises freedom and knowledge, but the elements it assimilates are expendable (zombies) and lack autonomy. For Miller, the Council of Constructs resembles a totalitarian state like Stalinism.

According to Gordon, Yagharek's struggle to become a member of the group and his subsequent expulsion point to the dynamic between two types of heterotopia: the violation of the norms of his own society and the clipping of his wings reflect the heterotopia of deviance, while the meeting with Isaac and acceptance into the group become a heterotopia of crisis for Yagharek, although the garuda does not restore wings or normality. As Gordon suggested, Yagharek, who, after being rejected by Isaac, attempts to rid himself of any features of hybrid bodily deviance, can be understood as “a modernist who struggles for pure normality in the hybrid world of the postmodern, where deviance is the norm.” In other words, “the modernist heterotopia of deviance for the postmodernist becomes a crisis heterotopia that transforms the grotesque into the norm,” erasing the distinction between the abnormal and the norm that is characteristic of modernism. Gordon linked this process of change to bonds of comradeship. As Wood suggested, Gordon’s idea of emancipatory forms of hybridity in heterotopias ignores the historical limitations of the concept of heterotopia: Foucault’s analysis is linked to the project of “high modernism,” to the early stage of the development of the capitalist world-system and the rise of Europe as the center of the system of power and knowledge. Heterotopias (psychiatric clinics, etc.) cannot be considered entirely antagonistic to this project, both due to their multiplicity and the fact that they were often constructed by the state as disciplinary spaces.

Gordon linked the station on Lost Street with the liminal or diffuse nature of heterotopia, which erases the distinction between "this and that" (Foucault). The station has a "diffuse, variegated, hybrid, chaotic nature"; as a border space, it is characterized by a "viscous permeability." The station connects both the geography of the city and the plot lines of the novel. According to Gordon, in contrast to the decentered rhizome of Gilles Deleuze and Félix Guattari, both the station and the Griss Twist are rather liminal, border spaces, "implicit gaps." They are included in the general system in which centers are formed, although they retain many of their rhizomatic qualities. The train station can serve as a metaphor for some characters, including Isaac, who thinks of himself as a train station.

=== Panopticon and Labyrinth ===
Hadas Elber-Aviram, developing Gordon's approach, noted the clash of disciplinary mechanisms (Note: Foucauldian concept of the city-disciplinary cell, an extension of the panopticon prison.) and the revolutionary forces of heterotopia in the context of the influence of Dickens on the novel Bleak House. In her opinion, the labyrinth with no exit, the structure of which is decisive for the novel, arises as a result of a "poetic understatement" (in the terms of Harold Bloom) (Note: According to Bloom, every writer is in fear of his predecessor and is forced to resort to the strategy of "poetic understatement" or "deflection" (clinamen).) According to Elber-Aviram, the author uses a specific intertextual device ("deviation"): having reached a certain point, Dickens's London turns into New Crobuzon, since the possibility of an exit and the existence of external space are excluded: "Dickens becomes even more Dickensian". The literary scholar believed that we are talking about two different modalities of labyrinthine space: in Dickens it is finite and complemented by the countryside, while in Miéville it is impossible to escape from New Crobuzon. The narrative never describes the outside world; the departure from the city coincides with the end of the text and the storyline of each character. According to Elber-Aviram, New Crobuzon is a "self-contained urban labyrinth" with no exit; Ariadne's thread in Miéville's novel leads into the city, not out. According to Elber-Aviram, while Dickens's salvation lies in escaping the city (Esther marries and settles on an estate), in Miéville it is "achieved through a mutually transformative dialectic of engagement with the metropolis"—Yagarek begins to feel part of New Crobuzon.

According to Elber-Aviram's summary, New Crobuzon Station, as a contemporary urban fantasy, modifies some of the quasi-fantastical images and metaphors of Bleak House, which are either present or implied in Dickens's narrative; The novel makes metaphors "literal… placing the resulting fantastic images in impossible landscapes". Both novels begin with an image of a city—London and New Crobuzon: the science fiction writer inverts the first paragraph of Dickens’s novel; the description of the landscape does not mention the name of the city with which the prologue ends; Dickens, on the contrary, opens the description in the first chapter with the word “London.” The descriptions of the city in both authors echo each other (dirt, river, smog and so on). The megalosaurus mentioned by Dickens (Note: Dickens uses a megalosaurus in metaphor to describe how the bad weather in London made the streets more suitable for a dinosaur than the city inhabitants.) turns into a predatory nocturnal monster; the flakes of soot, which are compared to snowflakes in Bleak House, become an animated "nasty milky slime".

The alternation of first- and third-person narratives in both novels, according to Elber-Aviram, is explained by the labyrinthine landscape; This technique allows us to show the labyrinth from both the inside and the outside. Thus, Yagharek, who sometimes acts as a narrator, wanders aimlessly, like Benjamin's flâneur, and gets lost in the urban labyrinth. The researcher linked the alternation of points of view with the Foucaultian distinction between the carceral city and heterotopia: if the third-person point of view reflects the perspective of the panopticon, then the first-person narrative—that of a traveler in the labyrinth—points to the subject of heterotopia (an aphasic, according to Foucault). As Elber-Aviram noted, Esther from Bleak House and Isaac are united by personal traumas; although Isaac's loss of Lyn is shown from the outside, the description is centered around his trauma. Personal trauma is preceded by a "rupture in the landscape," a fracture in the spatial order—this rupture reflects and strengthens it. The researcher noted that the third-person point of view allows us to establish where the traumatic events in the lives of the characters occurred and indirectly show the symbolism of these events. The coincidence of the location of the moths' detention and Lin's, according to Elber-Aviram, symbolically links "past mistakes and present suffering."

Both novels feature the Minotaur: in Dickens, it is the Supreme Court of Chancery; in Miéville, it is the Lost Street train station. As Elber-Aviram noted, the two buildings have different moral functions: the first is associated with disciplinary authority and the panopticon; the second marks the site of an anti-disciplinary heterotopia—a contrast indicated by the fact that one of the moths is destroyed on the roof of the station; the energy of crisis also manifests there, and Jack-Half-Prayer successfully defends Isaac and his comrades from the militia. According to Elber-Aviram's interpretation, the surveillance of all citizens by the city authorities through the militia turns the city into a vast panopticon. Mr Motley's lair is a heterotopia of deviation taken to the grotesque.

=== The Novel as Urban Dystopia: Maps and Space ===
Despite its despotism and repression, New Crobuzon is not a full-fledged police state or a full-fledged dystopia. The city "flourishes with life," retaining a vital force. Jessica Langer, referring to Miéville's Marxism, has suggested an "imaginary city of the proletariat", whose dystopian nature stems from the concentration of power in the hands of elites rather than from interpersonal contradictions. Raphael Zähringer has suggested that the work depicts a transition from totalitarian states (the dystopias of Orwell and Zamyatin) to a smaller-scale urban dystopia. Thus, the government of New Crobuzon strives for strict control, but is unable to control the entire urban space and movements within it, the various social environments, including relatively organized forms of resistance, and to do anything about legendary heroes (Jack Half-Prayer) or supernatural beings; the government cannot influence the state of the city, its growth and expansion. As Zähringer has written, the traditional model of a total surveillance state, striving for stability and isolation of both the individual and society as a whole, is not applicable to Mieville's urban dystopia. At its core is the insecurity caused by constant change and the blurring of boundaries; such a dystopia can be more terrifying than any totalitarianism. Dystopian elements are found in the "dark, tangled web of structures and relationships" in interpersonal conflicts and contradictions, "in the vestiges of classical dystopian institutions, in social groups, supernatural beings, and in the city itself". According to Zähringer, the novel's main theme, indicated by the title (perdido), is associated with wandering through a highly complex urban system, a hybrid zone filled with cunning and deception; in the context of the gap between "industrial decline and organic urban sprawl," constant insecurity, increasing contingency and complexity.

Zähringer believed that the obvious allegory with London is misleading. In his view, the novel engages the reader in a "game of recognition and misrecognition" and is a "meditation on maps" and on spatial imagination. Various characters are associated with, use, and create all sorts of maps (usually obscure and unscientific ones): from the "meteo-visionaries" of Cloud Tower to the moths, the Weaver, and Yagharek. The World Web is the most complete and accurate map (reminiscent of Deleuze and Guattari's rhizome), although the Weaver constantly moves around and within the web to maintain it. The moths, unlike medieval monsters, move within the map. Zähringer argues that maps both inform and misinform, presenting New Crobuzon as a dark and deceptive place where the only constants are change and disorientation. New Crobuzon is not a planned and ordered city, but a whole network of competing structures and movements, with gangsters, underground newspapers, and reclusive scholars.

As Zähringer puts it, the title "map and novel complement each other," compelling readers to return to it constantly, though its unrealistic nature mystifies. On the map, the city (dark gray) is clearly separated from the outside world (light), where white spots indicate the dominance and centrality of the metropolis. According to Veloso de Abreu, New Crobuzon resembles a circular brain with jagged edges. As literary scholar Stefan Ekman has noted, unlike Tolkien's maps, which illustrate the ease of travel, including beyond their borders, the map of New Crobuzon is limited to the city: going beyond its boundaries is going beyond the world. Researchers have noted the priority of the transport system—railways and overhead rails, which are mentioned in the legend—which, as Ekman believed, reflects a more modern world than in epic fantasy; streets, on the contrary, are difficult to identify, their names are absent. The dynamics of the map-text, inscribed in the political dimension of the novel, gives volume to the world of New Crobuzon: different places are connected in space and acquire meaning; the points of view of different characters are also connected, which allows for social and economic themes to be touched upon. Thus, Yagharek's perception of the Creekside houses emphasizes the otherness of the place, while Lin's perception emphasizes familiarity with it. As Ekman noted, thanks to Lin's point of view, which visits Kinken, and the spatial connections on the map, one can see, in addition to the conflict between the center (Kinken) and the periphery (Creekside), also the social conflict within the khepri community, internal marginalization due to orthodoxy and hypocrisy.

=== Comradeship. The Dialectic of Solidarity and Individualism ===
According to Gordon, comradeship and friendship allow us to resolve the issue of totalization and totalitarianism., transforming heterotopias of deviation into crisis heterotopias and thus preserving the integrity of the group; a "dialectic of feedback" within the group helps avoid totalitarianism. Groups based on comradeship and related to heterotopia and hybridity appear several times in the novel: the "unrecognized scholars" around Isaac, the artist community of Lin, the underground newspaper circle, and a mixed group that fights the moths and wins through "perseverance, ingenuity, courage, cooperation, skill". Gordon noted the persistence of a sense of comradeship, although the composition of the latter group changes: it includes different participants who enter into various "social, mechanical, political connections" and have different motivations. Thus, the Council of Constructs acts in its own interests, for the sake of unlimited power; Yagharek helps out of loyalty to Isaac, Derhan out of loyalty to Lin and the newspaper editor, who was tortured by the government. According to Gordon, the relationships in this group represent a kind of "concentric circles of interconnections": the group is led by Isaac and Derhan, and Lin, despite her helplessness, exerts an emotional influence on them; Yagharek is their friend, Pengefinchess and Jack Half-a-Prayer are fellow travelers who sympathize with and help the group; Andrej is an instrument, his image embodying the moral dilemma of the justification of ends and means.

According to Gordon, the "constantly convulsing dialectical unity of consciousness and subconsciousness" characteristic of humans and xenii (khepri, vodyanoi, and garuda) forms a "dialectic of friendship, feedback, community and communication". Isaac's team becomes a "cultural hybrid," a hybrid community that persists by the end of the novel, although only Isaac, the helpless Lin, and Derkhan remain in it. Feedback is impossible with the Weaver and the Council of Constructs: in the former case, interaction is difficult due to the Weaver's lack of a boundary between consciousness and subconsciousness; the unusual nature of his thinking leads to social isolation (conversation with him resembles a dialogue with a sleeping person or a madman), so common interests, exchange, community, or friendship are impossible. The Council of Constructs thinks in a completely different way: it has no subconscious, and only one-way communication is possible with it; The Council of Constructions is only interested in information and power; it operates with monologues and commands.

Literary scholar Christopher Palmer, noting the wide range of contemporary leftist agendas, values, and styles in the Bas-Lag novels, (Note: In Palmer's words, the author's "omnivorous political enthusiasm" for various political aspirations and possibilities is tempered by extremes and even self-parody. Palmer noted a certain conservatism in Miéville, despite all his materialism. Social development leads to decline, and progressive political movements arise but fail.) considered the novel to be the most systematic in the trilogy in problematizing group solidarity and the effects of group activity. According to Palmer, descriptions of species diversity and solidarity are combined with depictions of isolated and withdrawn loners, such as Yagharek or even the enthusiastic Isaac, although the latter can be considered sociable; with Yagharek, he behaves in a "childishly irresponsible" manner, but then becomes his friend. The "masculine, reserved" Yagharek, who keeps to himself, represents the opposite of Isaac; this friendship, according to Palmer, "gives depth to the depiction of cooperation in its varieties". Palmer identified the following dialectical pattern in the novel: (Note: The scheme is complicated by the fact that Isaac himself created the threat from which he saved the city.) group heroic achievements benefit the entire community (which remains unaware of them), but they are caused by individual guilt and error and are subject to manipulation or betrayal. Palmer characterized the group's results as comprehensive, yet simultaneously moderate and ambiguous.

According to Palmer, intersubjectivity and cooperation are embodied in the energy of crisis, which, in a "thrilling and complex denouement," forms the "deep structure of political action" and points to the possibilities of historical change; the energy of crisis is not ideal, exists only temporarily, and is associated with deception and exploitation. As Palmer noted, the formation of a group whose members possess diverse abilities leads not to real political action and real change, but to the collapse of illusions; New Crobuzon remains the same, despite its allegorical salvation from capitalism. According to Palmer, the novel's ending depicts a disconnect between the diversity of the vast, filthy city and the group's reality: the heroes leave New Crobuzon, and a rift occurs between Isaac and Yagharek. Palmer believed that Isaac's sudden decision to reject Yagharek may be correct, but it undermines the entire enterprise and its achievements.

=== The Novel as a Critique of Deconstruction. Ethics ===
Justin Cosner, arguing against Marxist approaches (Note: "Capitalism with an Inhuman Face".) and agreeing with Palmer, (Note: The problematization of collectivism and individualism.) argued that the moth plague embodies Miéville's poststructuralist method of deconstruction (Note: Post-structuralism was a response to structuralism and was developed through the work of Jacques Derrida and Gilles Deleuze. In literary theory, poststructuralists argue that as language is a closed system, the exact meaning of text cannot be determined exactly and is open to many interpretations, which is selected by the reader. Deconstruction, a core concept of poststructuralism seeks to ensure a close analysis of literary texts to discover the inherent meaning and any contradictions that exist in the text. This is what it includes and what it omits. It also seeks to identify what is known as binary oppositions, (concepts or terms that are the opposite of each other that can be used to classify language) are analysed to reveal their true nature. Post-structuralism has been criticised as its seen as unnecessarily complex, obscure and inaccessible and due to the instability of meaning, i.e. real truth, can lead to a form of relativism or be seen as nihilistic.)(destabilization without a reference). The writer criticizes abstract deconstructionism, which often predates collectivist politics but ignores "substantive… ethical differences." The moths destroy the repressive structures of capitalism, the social and political status quo, destabilizing the social order, leading to Émile Durkheim's anomie and the nihilism that Jean Baudrillard considered the outcome of deconstruction. Cosner noted that the partially segregated society of New Crobuzon is based on the dualism of body and mind as a social construct: while the lower classes and marginalized races are intimately bound to the body and risk being remade, for dominant groups it is their minds, not their bodies, that matter. They are simply people; they are not describable or “invisible” like the militia. The moths destroy modes of categorization and “systems of order”—binary systems that ensure domination, including body and mind, racial and class categories, gender binaries, and linguistic systems (in the spirit of Jacques Derrida and Baudrillard). The monsters are described as “unimaginable,” impossible to categorize, impossible to understand, impossible to predict their actions, and unclear about how their prey dies. The moths in the novel are described as hermaphrodites, but their gender is more complex: like the androgynes in Le Guin's The Left Hand of Darkness, one of them takes on the role of mother during a mating ritual; this role is temporary, with one moth perceiving the other as a "sister-brother". Cosner has noted that, according to the novel's text, the moths do not feed on thoughts or consciousness, but on secret thoughts, "sinful dreams... reflections" from dreams and nightmares; the contradictions and paradoxes of the subconscious are a "special drink" for moths. The moths, like deconstructionism, have no goal; the Council of Constructs and the Crisis Machine have a similar nature: the former expands, taking over the city, while the Crisis Machine destroys binaries, generating instability. Cosner referred to Palmer, who noted the collision and mutual destruction in the crisis machine of opposites.

To describe the moths, Cosner used Julia Kristeva's concept of the abject: here we are talking about a threat to "systems of order"—both the self and the law that binds the self and the Other; the abject is not something external. The symbol of the abject is the result of the moths' feast, when the distinction between life and death is erased. The destruction of binaries involves a particular sexualization: the tropes of male rape with phallus penetration (like the xenomorph Alien) and female seduction, when the dance of colors and patterns provokes desire in relation to the threat. The moths, like the unrealistic promise of "radical openness" of the crisis machine, refer to a political revolution devoid of positive content: the monsters ignore the differences between rich and poor, offering "equality"; their invasion is described as an epidemic affecting different species. This destruction psychologically threatens individual subjectivity, which Miéville associates with ethical choice and collective values; according to Cosner, the writer always takes into account intersubjectivity and the social context (partly economic), which allows him to avoid naivety and idealism. In polemics with Freedman, Kosner argued that the author sees an alternative to the deconstruction of the moths not in the love of the heroes, but in Isaac's ethical system, his subjective choice during the "unpleasant denouement" of the novel. Choosing between conflicting systems of law, his obligations and the law of the garuda, Isaac makess a choice in favor of the sovereignty of the "concrete" rather than the "abstract" individual — Kar’uchai. As Cosner noted, subjectivity is preserved not by the act itself, but by the relation of the action to the external referent. (Note: Cosner quoted Mikhail Bakhtin: "However, I neither express myself nor determine myself through my acts; I actualize through them something that has validity with respect to objects and meaning...".) According to Cosner, the strange denouement is "not a departure from the heroic narrative, but its culmination".

Andrew Rayment analyzed Isaac's dilemma regarding Yagharek (Note: The clipping of Yagarek's wings alludes to castration.) from the perspective of Jean-François Lyotard's concept of strife, (Note: Lyotard understands a feud as an insoluble conflict due to the impossibility of judging the arguments of both sides. This situation presupposes the legitimacy of both sides, the absence of an unbiased metalanguage, and a neutral position for making judgments.) in particular the question of what a friend must do to deserve betrayal. According to the researcher, strife is shown in its purest form thanks to the fantasy genre, which allows for the creation of irreconcilable differences. Isaac is tormented by the impossibility of a just act; in Slavoj Žižek's terms, this is a "terrorist demand"—not simply to do what they want, but to do it as if he himself wanted it. Isaac cannot help but translate the garudas' concepts into his own language, otherwise their "crime" ("the theft of choice") loses all meaning, and he is forced to act unjustly. As the researcher noted, the "crime" could be abortion, a situation Isaac translates into his own language. According to Rayment, the open ending shows that for Mieville, placing an individual (Isaac) in a situation of strife is a form of injustice, almost terrorism, although Isaac, betraying Yagharek and at the same time being unfair to Kar’uchai, acts in line with Lyotard's ethics; he chooses the best possible action.

== Inhabitants ==
=== Species ===
There are many species in Bas-Lag; these are the ones central to the plot:

- Khepri, an insectoid swarm species, communicate through pheromones and sign language, create collective artworks from Khepri spit using their glands, and live mainly in the Kinken district.
- Garuda, a winged hunter people from the deserts of Cymek, far south of New Crobuzon. Very group-oriented, no concept of ownership, freedom is the highest good, its restriction is considered a serious crime.
- Cactacae, vegetable, cactus-like bipedal beings, organized in tribes according to the Cactus Law, they mostly live in the so-called greenhouse – a gigantic glass dome in the Riverskin district or in the surrounding slums. They are mostly employed in heavy labor or as soldiers.
- Vodyanoi, aquatic, frog- and human-like sea folk, possess a special water thaumaturgy to temporarily solidify and shape liquids, mostly work in the harbor and at the locks.
- Wyrmen, approximately 40-kilogram, humanoid, barrel-bodied but capable of flight air creatures. Their intelligence is slightly above that of apes, which enables them, for a fee, to run small errands; they primarily feed on the waste of the city inhabitants, and live and die on the rooftops of New Crobuzon.
- Constructs, robots that can perform simple tasks using punched tape programming, are active in countless households and workshops of New Crobuzon, many of them having become intelligent, thinking machines through computer programs deliberately disseminated by the AI Construct Council.
- Handlinger, parasitic, tumor-like beings that roughly have the shape and approximately the size of a human hand. Through infection, they take over the mind and body of their respective host beings, continue their lives unnoticed, and possess uncanny powers. There are left-handed and right-handed creatures, which develop two specializations – sinistral ones have special mental abilities, making them the aristocrats of this species, dextral ones form a soldier caste.

=== Characters ===
- Isaac Dan der Grimnebulin, a human scientist, dabbling in all fields but obsessed with his pet theory of "crisis energy". Lover to Lin, and close friends with Derkhan Blueday.
- Yagharek, an exiled and de-winged garuda. He comes to Isaac to have his flight restored, willing to accept any method or price.
- Lin, Isaac's khepri lover, an artist who is commissioned by the gangster Mr. Motley to create a sculpture of his form.
- Derkhan Blueday, a middle-aged journalist and seditionist, co-editor of the underground newspaper Runagate Rampant.
- Lemuel Pigeon, Isaac's contact with New Crobuzon's criminal underworld.
- Mr. Motley, New Crobuzon's most feared ganglord, who runs a dreamshit harvesting operation, among many other nefarious activities. His body has been altered many times through remaking as punishment for his crimes, into an amorphous collection of body parts and appendages.
- Mayor Bentham Rudgutter, the corrupt mayor of New Crobuzon who bargains with crime syndicates and demons alike.
- MontJohn Rescue, an ambassador of the feared handlingers, working for the mayor.
- Lublamai Dadscatt, a researcher who shares lab space with David Serachin and Isaac Dan der Grimnebulin, first victim of the slakemoth.
- David Serachin, shares lab space with Isaac and Lublamai.
- Teafortwo, a dim-witted and friendly wyrman who runs small favours for Isaac.
- Construct Council, a hive-mind artificial intelligence formed in the city's rubbish dump. It controls many constructs in New Crobuzon.
- The Weaver, a multi-dimensional being in the form of a giant spider, who speaks in a never-ending torrent of free-verse poetry.

== Publishing history ==
The book was published simultaneously in the UK and Australia in March 2000 by Macmillan. The UK edition was a hardcover, while the Australian version was a trade paperback; it featured a cover by Edward Miller and was marketed as a dark fantasy novel. A US paperback followed in March 2001 from Ballantine Del Rey. The book has been translated into French, Italian, Spanish, Czech, German, Dutch, Romanian, Polish, Bulgarian, Ukrainian, Japanese, and Korean and Russian.

== Awards ==
Perdido Street Station was nominated for numerous prizes spanning the genres of science fiction and fantasy – for instance, both the British Fantasy Award and British Science Fiction Association Award – and won several honours, as detailed in the following table. It was also featured in Locus's poll of all-time best 20th century fantasy novels, where it ranked 6th place. (Note: The five novels that ranked higher in Locus's poll were The Lord of the Rings, A Game of Thrones, The Hobbit, A Wizard of Earthsea and Nine Princes in Amber.)

Year	Award	Result	Ref.
2001	Arthur C. Clarke Award	Won	
2001	British Fantasy Award	Won	
2001	BSFA Award	Nominated	
2001	James Tiptree Jr. Award	Nominated	
2001	Locus Award	Nominated	
2001	World Fantasy Award	Nominated	
2002	Hugo Award	Nominated	
2002	Premio Ignotus	Won	
2003	Kurd Laßwitz Preis	Won	
2003	Nebula Award	Nominated	
2004	Grand Prix de l'Imaginaire	Won	
