= The Scar (novel) =

2002 weird fantasy novel by China Miéville

- First edition hardcover
- Author: China Miéville
- Cover artist: Edward Miller
- Language: English
- Series: Bas-Lag novels
- Genre: New Weird
- Publisher: Macmillan Publishers
- Publication date: June 2002
- Publication place: United Kingdom
- Media type: Print (hardback & paperback)
- Pages: 717
- Award: Locus Award for Best Fantasy Novel (2003)
- ISBN: 0-333-78174-0
- OCLC: 49692277
- Dewey Decimal: 823/.914 21
- LC Class: PR6063.I265 S28 2002
- Preceded by: Perdido Street Station
- Followed by: Iron Council

The Scar is a weird fantasy novel by British writer China Miéville, the second set in his Bas-Lag universe. The Scar won the 2003 British Fantasy Award and was shortlisted for the 2003 Arthur C. Clarke Award. The Scar was additionally nominated for the Philip K. Dick Award in 2002 and the Hugo Award for Best Novel in 2003. It is set directly after the events described in Perdido Street Station.

== Plot summary ==
The Scar opens with the journey of a small ship which has set out from the city New Crobuzon (the setting of Perdido Street Station). It is heading to the city's new colony, Nova Esperium, which lies across the Swollen Ocean of Bas-Lag. On board the ship are:

- Bellis Coldwine, a cold, reserved linguist who is fleeing for her life for her alleged connection to the events in Perdido Street Station.
- Johannes Tearfly, a scientist whose interests lie in megafauna and underwater sealife.
- Tanner Sack, a Remade criminal (that is, he has had his body surgically and magically altered as punishment for his crime) who is bound for slavery.
- Shekel, a young cabin boy who befriends Tanner.

Before the ship reaches Nova Esperium, it is captured by pirates, and the passengers, crew and prisoners are all press-ganged into being citizens of Armada, a floating city made of thousands of ships. Tanner uses his newfound freedom to embrace his remaking. He has his body further remade and the earlier, rough work perfected, becoming an amphibious sea-creature. Treated now as an equal citizen rather than a prisoner or slave, Tanner's loyalties fiercely lie in Armada.

Bellis meanwhile despises her new life as a librarian for the city's vast collection of stolen books, and yearns for home. She gains the attention of the powerful Uther Doul, who is a bodyguard to the mysterious, scarred leaders of Armada known as the Lovers. Doul, for his own reasons, involves Bellis much more closely in the city's matters. She soon becomes privy to a plan formulated by the Lovers to raise a mythical sea creature known as the avanc. Simultaneously, she becomes involved with a New Crobuzonian spy named Silas Fennec, who reveals that the grindylow of the Cold Claw Sea are planning war on New Crobuzon. Silas was on his way home to warn his leaders of this war (thus saving the millions of innocents who might be slaughtered by the grindylow) when he was captured by Armada. Bellis and Silas find physical release in each other, and commiserate that they are powerless to save their home city.

Shekel, who is learning to read with Bellis's help, finds a strange book in the Armada's library. He brings it to Bellis, and she realizes that it is the book the Lovers need to raise the avanc. Knowing that she must get a message home, Bellis destroys a large part of the Appendix which shows the equations and methods to raise the avanc.

With the book destroyed, the Lovers seek the book's writer, Krüach Aum, the only person who knows how to summon the mythical creature. Armada mounts an expedition to his unnamed island home, which is the island of the dreaded Anophelii (a horrific and deadly race of mosquito-people). The Lovers find Aum and the information they need, while Bellis uses their time on the island, away from Armada, to get a message home warning of the impending grindylow invasion. Armada then successfully raises the avanc and captures it – no mean feat, as the avanc is an immense creature, several miles long. The Lovers' true plan is finally revealed: to use the great speed and pulling power of the avanc to find the fabled Scar, a place in the world where reality breaks down and anything is possible. The Lovers see this as a source of ultimate power.

On the journey far into unmapped waters, numerous matters threaten the city. Silas Fennec's actions, which have been far from honest, single-handedly bring down the fury of the New Crobuzon navy and the inhuman wrath of the grindylows. Following this, a civil war breaks out within the city. Terribly damaged, Armada finally nears the Scar, and faces the unsettling horrors that accompany the breakdown of possibility. They pick up a shipwrecked friend from a different train of possibilities, chances and choices, who warns them of The Scar and that he saw the city fall into the wound of the world and everybody was killed. Mutiny follows and the people of Armada finally force the city to turn around and head back to the Swollen Ocean, the life of quiet and piracy, that they all want.

The last chapter of the book is another excerpt of Bellis's letter home, in which she realizes how much she was being used by Doul. The reader is left to question how much Uther Doul actually was in control of the events in the book, which events were simply chance and which were 'planned' possibility.

== Reception ==
Steven Poole reviewed the book for The Guardian and struggled with the writing style at the beginning of the book, "All through the first 40 pages or so you can hear the grunts of a writer straining too hard for effect", but "[o]nce the novel settles down after its ill-judged beginning, Miéville begins to construct an intriguing plot of espionage and deceit". He concludes that "The Scar eventually demonstrates enough invention and brutal energy, firmly ruled by a calm architectonic intelligence, to show that Miéville is one of the most imaginative young writers around in any kind of fiction."

== Awards ==
- British Science Fiction Award nominee, 2002
- Philip K. Dick Award nominee, 2002
- British Fantasy Award winner, 2003
- Locus Award winner, 2003
- Arthur C. Clarke Award nominee, 2003
- Hugo Award nominee, 2003
- World Fantasy Award nominee, 2003

== See also ==
- List of underwater science fiction works
