= Kray =

Kray or krai may refer to:

- Krai, a type of a federal subject in Russia or a type of an administrative division of the former RSFSR
- KRAY-FM, a radio station
- Kray twins, the London gangsters
  - Charlie Kray, eldest brother, born before the Kray twins
- Black Kray, American rapper
- Baron Pál Kray (1735–1804), Hungarian-Austrian General during the Napoleonic Wars
- Kray, a 2010 Russian film
- Essen-Kray, a borough of the German city Essen

== See also ==
- Cray (disambiguation)
