= David Wolfe (Jesuit) =

16th-century Irish Jesuit

David Wolfe, SJ (died 1578?) was an Irish Jesuit who became papal legate in Ireland.

== Life ==
He was born in Limerick. After seven years in Rome, under the guidance of Ignatius Loyola and Francis Borgia, he entered the Society of Jesus about 1550, and became rector of the college at Modena.

About August 1560, Wolfe returned to Ireland, with the powers of an apostolic legate. He was instructed to regulate public worship, and to keep up communication with the Catholic princes. He attracted the attention of the English officials and in 1561 Elizabeth I of England stated to Pope Pius IV, as one of her reasons for not sending representatives to the Council of Trent, that Wolfe had been sent to excite disaffection. For several years he was unable to enter The Pale. On 7 December 1563, he delegated his jurisdiction for Dublin and its vicinity to Thady Newman. In 1564, the Pope, by a bull dated 31 May, entrusted to Wolfe and Richard Creagh the erection of universities and schools in Ireland.

In the early 1560s, Wolfe sent a number of Irish Catholic clerics to Rome. About 1566, he was arrested and imprisoned in Dublin Castle. In 1572, his release was paid for by a merchant, acting indirectly for Portuguese Jesuits. Wolfe went to Spain, but returned again to Ireland.

On 14 April 1577, Sir William Drury informed Francis Walsingham that Wolfe was to be sent to the Indies. On 24 March 1578, Drury informed the privy council that James Fitzmaurice had put to sea with Wolfe, and had captured an English ship, whose crew had been handed over to the Inquisition. But the end of Wolfe's life is obscure. He was in dispute with the Portuguese Jesuits who had arranged for his release. He also had to leave the Society of Jesus. On 28 June 1578, Everard Mercurian, the General of the Jesuits, wrote to James Fitzmaurice Fitzgerald, whose chaplain Wolfe had been at one time, stating that he would be glad of employment for Wolfe. It is assumed that Wolfe died within a year, since records of him end.
