= Richard Creagh =

Irish Roman Catholic bishop

Styles of Richard Creagh
- Reference style: The Most Reverend
- Spoken style: Your Grace or Archbishop

Richard Creagh (Irish: Risteard Craobhach; c. 1523 Limerick City – December 1586, Tower of London) was an Irish Roman Catholic clergyman who was the Archbishop of Armagh and Primate of All Ireland during the reign of Queen Elizabeth I. Along with the other Irish Catholic Martyrs, Archbishop Creagh is under investigation for possible Roman Catholic Sainthood. His current title is Servant of God.

== Life ==
The son of a merchant, his family (see Creagh) were Gaels, but had lived in Limerick City for generations. He was apprenticed to a merchant in Limerick who dealt in spices and herbs. Creagh chose a mercantile career and made many voyages to Spain. About the age of twenty-five, a providential escape from shipwreck led him to embrace a religious life, and after some years of seminary study abroad, he was ordained a priest. Creagh declined promotions to the See of Limerick and See of Cashel.

Returning to Ireland, he founded a school in Limerick's former Dominican abbey. The Papal nuncio, David Wolfe, named him for the primacy when it became vacant, and would accept no refusal. Creagh was consecrated Archbishop in Rome by Pope Pius IV, and in 1564 returned to Ireland as Archbishop of Armagh.

At the time, Seán Mac Cuinn Ó Néill, known in later centuries as "Shane the Proud" (Irish: Seán an Díomais), was Lord of Tír Eoghain, and the most powerful Irish clan chief in Ulster. From the first, The O'Neill and Archbishop Creagh were at variance. The O'Neill hated the Crown of England, while Archbishop Creagh repeatedly preached loyalty to the Queen of England in all purely civil matters inside Armagh Cathedral, and even in The O'Neill's presence. The O'Neill retaliated by ordering an arson that burned down the cathedral.

In retaliation, Archbishop Creagh excommunicated The O'Neill and forbade any priest to absolve him of the Mortal Sins of Sacrilege and putting a priest to death. Shane retaliated by threatening the life of the Archbishop, and by declaring publicly that there was no one on earth, except Queen Elizabeth I, whom he hated as intensely as Archbishop Creagh.

In spite of all this, Archbishop Creagh was arrested and imprisoned. Archbishop Creagh has left us the following description of his cell in Dublin Castle, "a hole where without candle there is no light in the world, and with candle, when I had it, it was so filled with the smoke thereof, chiefly in summer, that, had there not been a little hole in the next door to draw in breath with my mouth set upon it, I had been perhaps, shortly undone. But the two gentlemen who elected me to go out, (i.e.) escape with themselves and the said keeper, thought I should be much sooner undone in the second lodgings with cold, being thereto towards winter, removed, where scant was light as could be, and no fire."

His steadfast refusal, however, to Abjure the Catholic Faith or embrace the subservience of the Irish Church to control by the State, and his great popularity throughout Ireland were considered high treason in consequence, he was sent to London and committed to the Tower.

Twice he escaped, but he was retaken and in 1567 lodged in the Tower of London, according to the Queen's officials, solely for, "his hindering the Archbishop of Dublin's godly efforts to promote the Reformation."

From his repeated examinations before the Privy Council his enmity for Shane O'Neill and his unwavering loyalty to the Queen of England in all purely non-religious matters were made plain. Archbishop Creagh always concluded his appeals to the mercy of the Privy Council by, "wishing Her Majesty and all the realm as much wealth and prosperity of soul and body as ever had any Prince or realm."

Not content keeping him incarcerated, his enemies assailed his moral character. The daughter of his jailer was urged to accuse him of rape. The charge was investigated in public court, where the girl retracted her previous statement and declared the charges completely false.

== Death ==
It has been said that Creagh was poisoned in prison, and this, whether true or false, was widely believed at the time of his death. The principal suspect was the notorious double agent Robert Poley, best known for his role as agent provocateur in the Babington Plot and his suspected role in the killing of Christopher Marlowe. Poley, who was a fellow prisoner in the Tower during Creagh's last years there, is said to have visited him several times, but the suspicion seems to be based on his general bad character, rather than on any direct evidence of his guilt.

== Peter Creagh ==
His grand-nephew, Peter Creagh, was Bishop of Cork and Cloyne from 1676 to 1693. He was imprisoned for two years on suspicion of treason and attempted regicide during the Popish Plot in consequence of the false accusations of Titus Oates, but he was acquitted (1682). He was transferred to the Archdiocese of Tuam in 1686. After the 1688 coup d'état, Bishop Creagh followed King James II into exile on the Continent. Bishop Creagh was appointed Archbishop of Dublin in 1693, but was unable to return to Ireland and take over command of his still illegal and underground archdiocese. He became Coadjutor Bishop of Strasbourg, where he died (July 1705).

== Works ==
Creagh wrote:

- De Linguâ Hibernicâ; some collections from this work are among the manuscripts in the library of Trinity College Dublin.
- An Ecclesiastical History; a portion of this work was, in Sir James Ware's time, in the possession of Thomas Arthur, M.D.
- A Catechism in Irish, 1560.
- Account, in Latin, of his escape from the Tower of London, 1565. In Cardinal Moran's Spicilegium Ossoriense, i. 40.
- De Controversiis Fidei
- Topographia Hiberniæ
- Vitæ Sanctorum Hiberniæ
