= Iron Council =

2004 novel by China Miéville

- Cover of first edition (hardcover)
- Author: China Miéville
- Language: English
- Series: Bas-Lag novels
- Genre: Steampunk, Western
- Publisher: Del Rey
- Publication date: 2004
- Publication place: United Kingdom
- Media type: Print (hardback & paperback), E-book
- Pages: 576
- Award: Locus Award for Best Fantasy Novel (2005)
- ISBN: 0-345-46402-8
- OCLC: 55019061
- Dewey Decimal: 823/.914 22
- LC Class: PR6063.I265 I76 2004
- Preceded by: The Scar

Iron Council (2004) is a weird fantasy novel by the British writer China Miéville, his third set in the Bas-Lag universe, following Perdido Street Station (2000) and The Scar (2002). In addition to the steampunk influences shared by its predecessors, Iron Council draws several elements from the Western genre.

Iron Council is one of China Miéville's most overtly political novels, being strongly inspired by the anti-globalization movement, and tackling issues such as imperialism, corporatism, terrorism, racial hatred, homosexuality, culture shock, labour rights and war. The novel won the Arthur C. Clarke and Locus Awards in 2005, and was also nominated for the Hugo and World Fantasy Awards the same year.

== Plot ==
Iron Council follows three major narrative threads that join to form the novel's climax. Although Miéville weaves back and forth between narrative, time and space, this summary will follow each narrative individually, discussing their relation to each other toward the end. The novel is set in and around New Crobuzon, a sprawling London-esque city. New Crobuzon has for some unknown time been at war with Tesh, and is attempting to build a railroad across the outlying desert, partially as a new means of conducting this war. Against this backdrop, the novel follows the deeds of three main characters—Ori, Cutter and Judah Low.

Judah's story begins some 20 years before the novel's opening. Judah was hired as a railroad scout for New Crobuzon, charged with mapping terrain and informing the land's inhabitants of the railroad's coming. While doing so, he spends time with the Stiltspear, a race of indescribable creatures who can conjure golems, living creatures made from unliving matter. Judah attempts to warn the Stiltspear away, but they will not listen and he must settle for making a few recordings and beginning to learn their golemetric arts. Eventually, he returns to the railroad, which does indeed wipe out the Stiltspear. Shortly afterward, Judah, a prostitute named Ann-Hari, and a Remade named Uzman lead a revolution in which the rail workers drive the overseers away, free the Remade, and hijack the train, transforming it into a moving socialist dwelling.

Iron Council, the perpetual train, moves through the desert, gathering track from behind and laying it in whichever direction its citizens decide. The Council keeps moving to avoid the New Crobuzon militia, who are anxious to reclaim the train and destroy the rebellion-inspiring Council. Judah returns to New Crobuzon, where he immerses himself in esoteric golemetry literature, emerging as a master of the art. Eventually, Judah returns to the Iron Council, having spread its word throughout New Crobuzon, intent on using his golemetry to protect it.

Cutter, whom the reader joins at the novel's opening, was a friend, disciple, and lover to Judah during Judah's return to New Crobuzon. He leads a group consisting of other disciples of Judah in search of the Iron Council to warn of an impending attack by the New Crobuzon militia. After living and working with the council for a while, Cutter returns with Judah and others to New Crobuzon to inspire revolt with the news of Iron Council, which has decided to return to the city and confront the militia on its own turf. In the Iron Council's travels they meet Qurabin, a monk of the Moment of the Hidden and Lost, who continually trades aspects of themselves in return for whatever knowledge they need (having previously traded their gender, and over the course of the novel, their native language, various memories, and finally their eyes to help the protagonists).

Meanwhile, dissatisfied revolutionary Ori is led by a half-crazed old homeless man named Spiral Jacobs to join the militant gang of Toro. Committing robberies, raids, and even murder, Toro's group proceeds mercilessly on its quest to assassinate the mayor of New Crobuzon, a plan which is later revealed to be personal rather than political. During Ori's struggles with and against his new gang, an uprising by the Collective, a union of revolutionary groups, threatens to finally wrest New Crobuzon from the hands of its corrupt parliament and militia. After several days of fighting, however, the Collective is destroyed. Ori then learns that Spiral Jacobs is actually a powerful sorcerer sent by Tesh to introduce a dark, destructive force into the midst of New Crobuzon. Here Judah, Ori, and Cutter unite to stop Jacobs with the help of Qurabin, who takes the Tesh ambassador with him 'into the domain of Tekke Vogu'. Ori is killed in the confrontation.

In light of the collapse of the Collective, Judah sends Cutter to dissuade Iron Council from returning. He is unsuccessful, and Judah conjures a time-golem to freeze the train in time to save its citizens. Ann-Hari murders Judah shortly thereafter for thwarting the attack. As the novel ends, Iron Council has become a public monument of sorts, poised on the verge of attacking New Crobuzon until the unknown moment when the time golem dissipates. Cutter re-immerses himself in New Crobuzon's underground resistance movements, revitalising the protest publication Runagate Rampant.

== Reception ==
Steven Poole reviewed the book for The Guardian and noted that while it was "full of wondrous scenes and sequences," it was also true that "in comparison with The Scar, such ideas are fewer and less indulgently elaborated. Iron Council feels more po-faced, more weighed down by its tonnage of political baggage ... Still, fantasy fiction is usually fabulously conservative, and Iron Council – with its implicit trade unionism, as well as the fact that many characters are casually bisexual – stands as a rebuke to the genre's medieval politics." In The Washington Post, Michael Dirda called Miéville's New Crobuzon "[...] an unweeded garden of unearthly delights", and described Iron Council as "a work of both passionate conviction and the highest artistry."
