= Kieran Creagh =

Irish Passionist priest, from Belfast

Kieran Creagh, is an Irish Passionist priest from Belfast, who survived being shot while working in South Africa, where he had founded a hospice (Leratong meaning place of love) to help sufferers of HIV/Aids.

Born in Belfast to Kate and Jim Creagh, Kieran studied at Queens University, Belfast. At the age of 14, he witnessed the IRA kill a cab driver and his passenger, and was also shot at. He nearly escaped death when a local gas station when was bombed during The Troubles. At the age of 23, he joined the Passionist order. He continued his studies at the Milltown Institute in Dublin.

Fr. Kieran was the first person in Africa to be injected with a trial HIV vaccine. In 2004 he was named Irish International Personality of the Year.

In February 2007, he was shot three times during an armed robbery at his home near the hospice in Atteridgeville. He survived, and his attackers were convicted and sentenced to 15 years imprisonment. He returned to South Africa following his recovery but eventually returned to Ireland. He learned the Irish language, and ministered from 2012 until 2016 on Tory Island, County Donegal.

In 2016 Fr. Creagh was appointed to the Holy Cross Church, Ardoyne, located in Belfast. From 2022 to 2025, he ministered at the Sacred Heart Parish in Oldpark, Belfast; which he left to serve in Paris.

Creagh's father Jim Creagh was a former UTV and Irish News journalist, and his brother Liam Creagh is a journalist who has worked with BBC and Sky News.
