= Fred Cray =

American artist

- Born: 1957 (age 68–69); Evanston, Illinois, U.S.
- Education: Hotchkiss School; Middlebury College (BA); Skowhegan School of Painting and Sculpture; Yale School of Art
- Occupation: Artist
- Website: fredcray.com

Fred Cray (born 1957) is an American multimedia artist based in Brooklyn, New York whose first solo show, in 2000, of his photographs were described by The New York Times as "lush, gaudy and ethereal Technicolor spirit photographs", and whose works are now contained in the collections of many major art institutions, including the Brooklyn Museum, the Center for Photography at Woodstock, New York Public Library, and the George Eastman Museum.

== Life, art, accomplishments ==
Cray was born in Evanston, Illinois and is a graduate of The Hotchkiss School in Lakeville, Connecticut. He earned a B.A. degree from Middlebury College in 1979, attended the Skowhegan School of Painting and Sculpture, and did graduate studies in painting at the Yale School of Art.

In 2003 he was awarded a Guggenheim Fellowship and shortly thereafter received a Pollock–Krasner award. In 2008 he was awarded a Peter S. Reed Foundation grant.

Cray's "two-minute portraits" are large-scale self-portraits, inquiring into the persistence of the photographic image. His series of unique collage prints, "travel diaries", are narrative/impressionist tours of the world and his mind.

Since starting his ongoing Unique Photographs project in 2008, he has scattered more than 26,000 one-of-a-kind photographs across various locations worldwide, often placed discreetly yet sometimes in plain sight for people to discover. Many of these placements are documented on the Instagram feed associated with the project. Several books have been published in connection with the Unique Photographs project, such as Unique Photographs, Changing The Guard, Conversations, and Cray Cray. Furthermore, additional unique photographs are created specifically for these book projects and exhibitions.

Since 2008, Cray has left or hidden over 26,000 unique photographs in New York, the United States and different parts of the world including Europe, Asia, Australia and South Africa. review Fred Cray-Unique Photographs/Photobookstore Magazine 1 November 2013

Cray is represented by Janet Borden Inc.

== Publications ==
- Cray, Fred; Grundberg, Andy & Cooley, Martha (Contributors) (1999). Fred Cray: Self-portraits: The Tremaine Gallery Exhibition Catalog (First ed.). Tremaine Gallery of Hotchkiss School, Lakeville, Connecticut.
- Fred Cray: May 3 - June 18, Tremaine Gallery, The Hotchkiss School. Hotchkiss School and Janet Borden, Incorporated. 1999.
- Cray, Fred (2009). Self. [New York?]: Sixty-four Books.
- Cray, Fred (2009). Uniforms. 64 Books.
- Cray, Fred (2009). Words. 64 Books. ISBN 978-0-9842387-0-5.
- Cray, Fred (2010). Berlin. 64 Books. ISBN 978-0-9842387-5-0.
- Cray, Fred (2010). Movies. 64 Books. ISBN 978-0-9842387-3-6.
- Cray, Fred (2010). Red. 64 Books.
- Cray, Fred (2011). Devices. 64 Books. ISBN 978-0-9842387-9-8.
- Cray, Fred (2011). Porn. 64 Books. ISBN 978-0-9842387-6-7.
- Cray, Fred (2011). Rome. 64 Books. ISBN 978-0-9842387-7-4.
- Unique photographs. Fred Cray. 2013. ISBN 978-1-61704-201-0.
- Changing the guard. Fred Cray. 2014. ISBN 978-1-61704-202-7.
- Conversations. Fred Cray. 2014. ISBN 978-1-61704-203-4.
- Cray Cray. Fred Cray. 2015. ISBN 978-1-61704-210-2.
- Cray, Fred (2015). Cray Cray (1st ed.). 64. ISBN 978-1-61704-210-2.
- Cray, Fred (2016). Silhouettes. 64 Books. ISBN 978-1-61704-209-6.
