= Bas-Lag =

2000–2004 Series of three books by China Miéville

Bas-Lag is a fictional universe in which several of China Miéville's novels are set. Bas-Lag is a world where both magic (referred to as thaumaturgy) and steampunk technology exist, and where many intelligent races live. This world and the novels set in it are, in generic terms, informed by the horror, fantasy and science fiction traditions. As with all China Miéville's works, there is also a strong presence of social and political opinion.

== Novels ==
There have been three novels so far set in Bas-Lag:

- Perdido Street Station
- The Scar
- Iron Council

The short story "Jack", featured in the 2005 collection Looking for Jake, is also set in Bas-Lag.

== Geography ==
Bas-Lag possesses several continents. Two landmasses, Rohagi and Bered Kai Nev, are named in the three novels, though numerous other landmasses and structures play important roles.

=== Rohagi ===
The exact geography of Rohagi is unknown. New Crobuzon lies about 10 miles (16 km) inland from its eastern coast, which borders the Swollen Ocean. South of New Crobuzon is the Rudewood, beyond which are the Mendican Hills. North of New Crobuzon, along the coast but separated from it by the Bezhek Mountains, are the ruins of Suroch. To the west, about a thousand miles from New Crobuzon and beyond the Dancing Shoe Mountains, lies a four-hundred mile wide freshwater lake called Cold Claw Loch. The Loch connects with the inland Cold Claw Sea, eight hundred miles to the north, via a natural channel called Cold Claw Sound. The Cold Claw Sea is talon-shaped, stretching eastward a great distance, almost connecting with the Swollen Ocean before curving southward for about two hundred miles, ending about seven hundred miles north of New Crobuzon. This southward curve is the Gengris, populated by the dangerous grindylow.

According to a character in Iron Council, both Cobsea and Myrshock lie about 750 miles (1,210 km) southwest of New Crobuzon. Cobsea lies inland and borders the Cacotopic Stain, a large wasteland created by the unreliable magical energy known as Torque. Myrshock lies on the northern coast of the Meagre Sea. A wealthy industrialist attempted to build a transcontinental railway that would link New Crobuzon with Cobsea and Myrshock, as the two states are trading partners, but was unsuccessful. However, the end of Iron Council indicates a second attempt at the project, using information gathered by the industrialist's agents throughout the course of the book.

South of the Meagre Sea is the Cymek Desert, which is home to the nomadic garudas. The Cymek also contains the northern port city of Shankell, which is known for its brutal gladiatorial combat, and the southern city of Dreer Samheer, both of which are predominantly populated by the cactacae.

West of the Cymek Desert lies the Galaggi Veldt, which is home to Tesh and is neighboured by the Witchocracy, which it goes to war against New Crobuzon in Iron Council. Tesh controls the Fire Water Straits, which lead to an unidentified inland body of water that borders the Swollen Ocean. The control of the Fire Water Straits results in a war between New Crobuzon and Tesh. Crobuzine victory in this conflict is implied following the failure of the Teshi thaumaturgical attack upon the city. The Firewater Straits are renamed the Sanguine Straits during the course of the war, due to the ferocity and cost of the naval battles to control them.

=== Bered Kai Nev ===
Bered Kai Nev is a continent to the east of Rohagi. The khepri are believed to be native to this continent, but were driven out by an event known as The Ravening, and now live as refugees in various cities in Rohagi, although primitive khepri are rumored to still inhabit Bered Kai Nev.

=== Islands and other landmasses ===
Gnurr Kett is an island that lies 2,000 miles (3,200 km) south of New Crobuzon and 500 miles (800 km) east of the Cymek Desert. The island is known for its scholarly capital city, Kohnid. Some of its knowledge is derived from a colony of anophelii that they maintain. This colony is the only known remnants of the Malarial Queendom, a brutal regime that was active in the areas of Bas-Lag with a warm climate.

The Jheshull Islands are a small trio of islands that lie off the coast of Rohagi. They were involved in the Pirate Wars and are on the decline due to their position against New Crobuzon.

Nova Esperium is one of New Crobuzon's colonies. Very few people choose to go to Nova Esperium of their own volition because of the long journey to the colony and rampant disease, but New Crobuzon's government pays for the passage of any volunteers. The exact location of Nova Esperium is not given, although it lies a great distance across the Swollen Sea, southeast of New Crobuzon.

==== Armada ====
The pirate city of Armada is a mobile city-state consisting of numerous ships lashed together to form a large, connected settlement. It is divided into small districts which are ruled by unique rulers, such as a High Cromlech vampir. Armada moves around the Swollen Ocean by means of a small fleet of tug ships, and is the central setting of The Scar. Armada's origins are unknown, but it has existed in one form or another for at least a thousand years. At the opening of The Scar, its population is said to number in the hundreds of thousands. The city itself is only about a mile wide, though one character claims that "there are probably as many miles of streets here as in New Crobuzon" owing to all its "layers and layers of decks."

The city's population is made up of humans, cactacae, khepri, ab-dead, remade, scabmettlers, and other races. People considered criminals (or of lower classes) in their former home states are recast as equals upon joining Armada, and often go on to hold positions of power.

Armada gains its wealth through piracy. Piracy also leads to acquisition of knowledge in many languages (books are stolen for the Grand Gears Library), and the growth of Armada's population, since any ship intercepted by Armada's forces is assimilated into the city and its crew and passengers press-ganged into citizenship for life. The language of Armada is Salt, a constructed language deliberately made easy to learn and consisting of vocabulary from the languages of the many races that inhabit the city.

During The Scar, the rulers of Garwater riding, the Lovers, carry out a plan to raise the legendary avanc to give Armada ultimate power over the seas. This was tried once before in Armada's history, as evidenced by five enormous chains attached to the undersides of the city's largest ships. Along with a team of scientists and engineers, and against the wishes of several of the other ridings, Garwater is able to summon the avanc using great physical and magical energy. This gives Armada the means to travel to the mythical "Scar".

Armada's ridings are:

- Garwater: The most powerful of the ridings, led by the Lovers, two nameless scar-covered pirates who influence most of Armada's decisions. Garwater's flagship is The Grand Easterly. It is also in possession of two enormous airships, the Arrogance and the Trident, as well as the stolen New Crobuzon deep-sea rig Sorghum.
- Dry Fall: Governed by a vampir called the Brucolac, Dry Fall's residents are prosperous and have the most security and individual freedoms of any of the ridings in Armada, but they pay for this through a "goretax," donating their own blood to their leader. Dry Fall, along with Curhouse, stands against Garwater's plans to raise the avanc. Dry Fall's flagship is the Uroc.
- Booktown: Run by a khepri triumvirate. Booktown houses the Grand Gears Library, Armada's stronghold of knowledge.
- Curhouse: Curhouse is the most democratic of the ridings, and is governed by a large Council, who tend to oppose the Lovers. Curhouse is where Bellis Coldwine's ship the Terpsichoria ends up, and it is also the location of Croom Park, a large public garden spread over several ships that have been gutted and filled with soil.
- Thee-and-Thine: This riding is led by a trader-king named Friedrich, whose favour is easily bought by the Lovers. It is regarded as a lawless slum-like neighbourhood by the greater populace of Armada, but Bellis observes that it is more mercantile than lawless. Its flagship is the Salt Godling.
- Bask: Bask's flagship is the Tailor's Moan. It is home to the menfish.
- Jhour: This riding is led by a Cactacae queen named Braginod. Its flagship is the Saskital.
- Shaddler: This riding is governed by a general, and is home to the majority of the scabmettler population. Its flagship is the Therianthropus.
- The Haunted Quarter: A deserted riding of ancient ships, believed to be inhabited by ghouls and other supernatural beings. It was used as a hideout for Silas Fennec.

== History ==
=== Ghosthead Empire ===
Over three thousand years before the events of The Scar, powerful entities from another plane of existence ruled all of Bas-Lag for a period of 500 years. The Ghosthead, as these entities were known, originated from a different plane of existence somewhere on the eastern rim of the universe. Seeking a milder place to live than their homeworld, which had a cycle of days and nights that created oceans of molten iron and froze the atmosphere, the Ghosthead built a "metal fish" and used it to find Bas-Lag. Their arrival created The Scar, a massive physical and dimensional rift on Bas-Lag's surface. The Ghosthead harnessed the energy from The Scar by a process called "possibility mining", and used this power to gain control over all of Bas-Lag. The Ghosthead Empire was ultimately destroyed by a rebellion called the Contumancy, followed by a period known as the Sloughing-Off. The Empire's history survives in documents such as the Imperial Canon, and in lost technologies and structures, like Possible Swords and Possible Towers, scattered in hidden places across Bas-Lag.

=== Malarial Queendom ===
The Malarial Queendom was a short-lived empire built by the anophelii, with territory in Rohagi, Shoteka, and the Shards. Two thousand years before the events of The Scar, the Queendom collapsed and the anophelii were nearly eradicated. The remaining anophelii were driven to a small island south of Gnurr Kett, where they are kept in isolation as captive scholars for the Gnurr Kett nobility.

=== First Umbric Age ===
The First Umbric Age, in which the Bas-Lag novels are set, is a period of feuding between the states on Rohagi after the Ghosthead Empire falls. The calendar used by New Crobuzon marks its years from the start of the First Umbric Age.

==== Full Years ====
The Full Years are New Crobuzon's golden age, when the city achieves its greatest advances in science, technology, and thaumaturgy. Decline sets in during the late 15th century and some of this knowledge is lost. To prove that the golden age is not at an end, New Crobuzon constructs a massive ship, the largest in the world at that time, intended to be the pinnacle of New Crobuzon industry. However, the Grand Easterly is a boondoggle that suffers from several design flaws. It is briefly converted into an ineffectual warship during the Pirate Wars, and unbeknownst to New Crobuzon, the ship is captured by Armada.

==== Pirate Wars ====
Also known as the "Slow War" and the "False War", the Pirate Wars is a protracted conflict between the City-State Republic of New Crobuzon and the cities of Suroch and Jheshull. The Wars end in the year 1544 when the New Crobuzon militia drop Torque bombs on Suroch, with horrific results. In 1545, New Crobuzon attempts to cover this up by dropping colourbombs on Suroch's ruins, but two colourbombs misfire; the third detonates as planned, obliterating a few square miles of what is left of Suroch. When heliographs of the destruction are taken by a militia research team and leaked to the New Crobuzon public a century later, widespread riots almost bring down the government in 1689. Research into Torque is permanently stalled when financiers back out, cowed by the public.

==== The Ravening ====
Around the year 1679 (a century before the events of Perdido Street Station), khepri civilization in Bered Kai Nev is wiped out by a disaster described as "The Ravening". Khepri refugee ships arrive at New Crobuzon for the next 25 years, which is known as the "Tragic Crossing." The Ravening is such a traumatizing event that nearly all khepri survivors have forgotten or refused to speak about ten thousand years of khepri history; as a consequence, most khepri culture is lost forever.

==== 1779–1780 ====
The events of Perdido Street Station occur at this time, followed several months later by the events of The Scar.

==== 1804 ====
The events of Iron Council occur at this time.

== Politics and society ==
=== Known states ===
The Brothers
In Iron Council, The Brothers is said to lie on the western side of Rohagi, beyond the Cacotopic Stain. It is referred to as the "crocodile double-city."

Gharcheltist
In Iron Council, Gharcheltist is referred to as an aquapolis, and is presumably a vodyanoi city.

The Gengris
The Gengris refers to both a location and the aquatic grindylow who inhabit it. The Gengris is described as a cross between an island and a half-sunken city lying at the southern tip of the Cold Claw Sea, seven hundred miles due north of New Crobuzon. Little else is known about the city itself, except that it is home to "malachite chapels," "limb-farms," and "bile workshops". The grindylow of The Gengris willingly trade with outsiders, rewarding traders for oddities such as barrels full of salt and glass beads, but frequently eliminate outsiders who have transgressed in some way; the nature of these transgressions are usually opaque to all but the grindylow, and trade is extremely risky for outsiders.

Hell
Hell Maintains an embassy in New Crobuzon.

High Cromlech
Almost everything that is currently known about High Cromlech comes from Uther Doul, one of the primary characters in The Scar. Doul was born and raised in High Cromlech. He describes it as a caste-based nation ruled by undead nobility, called "thanati." These he describes as "liches with sewn-shut mouths, with beautiful clothes and skin like preserved leather.": The living (called "the quick") are a minority in High Cromlech. Most are bred and raised on farms, and are eventually snuffed and recast as zombies. Some are reared by the thanati, to be slain and welcomed to dead society once they come of age. A small fraction of the living are born free and survive by doing work that is too skilled or dangerous for zombies. Zombies are High Cromlech's primary workforce. At the bottom of High Cromlech's social ladder are the vampir, which are referred to as "ab-dead" to distinguish them from the thanati. Based on Doul's description, the vampir are considered vagrants and addicts. They live in shanty towns, coming out at night to beg the living for blood.

Khadoh
Khadoh's merchants trade with New Crobuzon.

Maru'ahm
Maru'ahm is on the western side of the Rohagi continent, beyond the Cacotopic Stain. In Perdido Street Station, it is said to be ruled by a casino-parliament, "where laws were stakes in games of roulette." This rumor is affirmed in Iron Council, where a character who visited Maru'ahm claims he played for such stakes as property laws and "a whole pot of legislation." This same character mentions a queen and "cardsharp senators," implying that Maru'ahm's government is some form of constitutional or elective monarchy.

New Crobuzon
The city-state of New Crobuzon is a major geopolitical player in all three of the Bas-Lag novels. It is situated at the confluence of the rivers Tar, Canker, and Gross Tar, about ten miles (16 km) west of the Swollen Ocean. It is a parliamentary republic with a Mayor elected by Parliament, though its politics are deeply corrupt and oligarchic. Its electoral system favors its human majority, and only the wealthy, as well as some randomly selected through a "suffrage lottery", are enfranchised. The Fat Sun party rules throughout all three Bas-Lag novels, but other political parties include the opposition reformist Finally We Can See, the xenophobic and reactionary New Quill (called "Three Quills" in Perdido Street Station) and the pro-minority-rights Diverse Tendency. New Crobuzon is one of Bas-Lag's most economically and militarily powerful states. In The Scar, it dispatches a fleet halfway around the world to combat the pirate-city of Armada. In Iron Council, it carries out a protracted war with the distant city-state of Tesh, and crushes an internal rebellion with force.

Qé Banssa
Qé Banssa is built upon the peaks of Dancing Bird Island. It is called a "poor, ugly little fishing port" by a protagonist in The Scar. As with Tarmuth, Qé Banssa seems to survive thanks to New Crobuzon.

Salkrikaltor
The Cray Commonwealth of Salkrikaltor is found beneath the Swollen Ocean, far east of New Crobuzon between the islands of Bartoll and Gnomon Tor. Salkrikaltor and New Crobuzon are described in The Scar as being trading partners on amiable terms. The capital of the Commonwealth is Salkrikaltor City. Most of Salkrikaltor City is located underwater, though there is a "topside" district for non-aquatic creatures that seek to do business with the cray. The submerged part of the city is described in The Scar as "convoluted and interconnected," with "little squares of seaweed topiary" and "coral courtyards." The above-water district is described as consisting mostly of towers carved from rock and coral, "a mass of contrary styles," with floating platforms and buildings suspended by struts and columns.

Suroch
Suroch was a city which fought and lost a series of wars against New Crobuzon known in the latter as the Pirate Wars. In the time of the Bas-Lag novels' setting, Suroch has already been completely destroyed and rendered uninhabitable to humans by the effects of magical weapons of mass destruction, the "colourbomb" and devices using Torque. Suroch is the only place in the novels with a Torque contamination similar to that of the Cacotopic Stain. Mentions are made in Perdido Street Station of "cockroach trees" in Suroch and "herds of what might once have been human." The publishing of heliotypes of the Torque contamination in the illicit Sacramundi report put an end to Torque experiments in New Crobuzon.

Tarmuth
Tarmuth a protectorate of New Crobuzon situated at the mouth of the Gross Tar River, on the coast of the Rohagi continent, about ten miles (16 km) east of New Crobuzon. The protagonist in The Scar describes it as "an ugly, violent town" used by privateers and freebooters as safe harbor. Besides prostitution and piracy, Tarmuth survives by manufacturing ships, and exists thanks to New Crobuzon's patronage.

Troglodopolis
Troglodopolis is referred to in Perdido Street Station as a "chthonic burrow."

Vadaunk
Vadaunk lies somewhere south of New Crobuzon, beyond the Cacotopic Stain. According to government propaganda in Perdido Street Station, the changing seasons "bring an onslaught of superstitious repression" there. In Iron Council it is called the mercenary kingdom.

Yoraketche
Yorachetche is located beyond the Wormseye Scrub, northwest of New Crobuzon. It is briefly mentioned in The Scar as a city whose main export is mercenary warriors.

=== Known languages ===
Ragamoll is the common tongue of New Crobuzon. It seems to be widely spoken throughout eastern Bas-Lag by members of all races. Likewise, Salt is the language of the Swollen Ocean, spoken by pirates, sailors and other maritime peoples. In The Scar, Salt is described as a patchwork language which borrows aspects from various other tongues, principally Ragamoll.

The anophelii maintain a written language called High Kettai, which is used by various scholars and publishing houses. It is implied that high Kettai is inflected as it is known to possess an "ironic case." Base Kettai is High Kettai's more widely understood cousin.

Quiesy (also known as "Deadish") is the principal language of High Cromlech. Since many of its speakers have either sewn-shut mouths or larynxes too decayed to form sounds properly, it consists of a series of coughing grunts, with "intricately timed pauses" that are as important as the spoken element. It can also be "spoken" entirely soundlessly, with gestures or eye movements.

The khepri communicate through sign language and scented chemicals, since their insect-heads do not permit vocalization. They also maintain a written language called High Khepri.

The vodyanoi speak at least three different languages: the primary one being Lubbock and the others Fellid and Southern. The traditional language of the Cactacae is Sunglari. The garuda of the Cymek speak an unnamed language. The people of Tesh, the people of Khadoh, the Salkrikaltor Cray, and the hotchi of the Rudewood all speak their own, eponymous languages.

=== Known races ===
==== Anophelii ====
Mosquito-like beings (singular Anophelius). The females look like scrawny human women, with huge paddle-like wings with which they fly after their prey. From their mouths they can extend a chitinous proboscis, which they stab into their prey to suck them dry. Female Anophelii are vicious, bloodthirsty and very dangerous except immediately after feeding, when they demonstrate an intelligence superior to that of the (already notably intelligent) male sex. The males are short, stocky men that look no different from human men, aside from their sphincter-like mouths. Anophelii have now been confined to a single island, but once ruled much of the world in an empire called The Malarial Queendom. The threat of a resurgent Queendom is the cause of the strict quarantine around the Anophelii island.

==== Cactacae ====
Humanoid cacti. The Cactacae are enormous plant people, often towering over human beings. Although their young grow out of the ground, they nurse them as mammals do. Cactacae have sap for blood. They are known for their strength, and are often employed as laborers and bodyguards. Cactacae bodies are fibrous, with wooden bones, making them notoriously difficult to kill or wound with normal weapons; bullets pass nigh-harmlessly through them. The Cactacae community in New Crobuzon is based around and within a massive, dilapidated, greenhouse-like structure called The Glasshouse, and is allowed to exist as a nominally independent community within the city. Their weapons of choice are Rivebows, oversized crossbows that fire a spinning metal disc capable of shearing off Cactaceae limbs.

==== Cray ====
An aquatic race who look like humans from the waist up (with the exception of protruding gills behind the ears) and rock lobsters from the waist down. They use domesticated squids to hunt. Many live in an underwater city, Salkrikaltor, which rivals New Crobuzon itself in size.

==== Elementals ====
Beings that embody their respective elements. They are wild and mostly untameable, although the thaumaturges called elementarii (singular elementarius) specialize in summoning and unleashing them on their enemies. There are apparently elementals for a broad array of concepts and things: Iron Council mentions, among others, elementals of flesh, wood, glass and cement.

==== Garuda ====
The garuda are nomadic humanoid birds of prey. Most hail from the Cymek desert, where they live in tribes. They are hunters with a fierce sense of individualism. They resemble winged humans with avian heads and feet; their society is completely communist, with individual possessions seen as reducing the individual's freedom. A small ghetto of garuda live in New Crobuzon, and a few are described as living near the Cacotopic Stain in Iron Council. Garudan law is based around the principle of freedom of choice; all their crimes are forms of "choice-theft", denying another being the right to choose their own fate. Their name is derived from the Garuda of Hindu folklore.

==== Grindylow ====
A race of very powerful, mysterious, and sadistic fish-people (something between eels and viperfish) who appear in The Scar. Capable of survival in salt and fresh water, as well as in the air, they can communicate telepathically with a variety of aquatic species including whales and Cray. Their name comes from a creature of English nursery stories. Mieville's Grindylow bear a similarity to the Deep Ones of the Cthulhu Mythos. Grindylow use powerful shamanistic magic, the use of which can deform human users.

==== Handlingers ====
Sentient parasitic disembodied hands which control the mind of their host. There are two types: sinistrals, the noble caste, and dextriers, the soldier caste. When possessing a body, dextriers can use a number of supernatural abilities, including flight, fire-breathing, and enhanced strength. Dextriers and sinistrals typically pair up when engaging in scouting or combat; the sinistral has command of the pair while the dextrier performs most of the offensive actions.

==== Hotchi ====
According to Iron Council and several minor mentions throughout Perdido Street Station, the hotchi are a race of humanoid hedgehog people who ride a domesticated breed of giant rooster.

==== Humans ====
Humans are apparently the dominant race in New Crobuzon, and perhaps on Bas-Lag as well. They seem to be identical to their real world counterparts in most respects, except that many have the ability to use magic.

==== Khepri ====
The khepri are a race of humanoid scarab beetles. Female khepri possess bodies very similar to those of human women, except that their skin is crimson in colour and they possess large scarab beetles in place of heads. They communicate with each other via movements of their "headlegs" and squirts of chemicals. The female khepri are noted artists, using a biological excretion to sculpt breathtaking works of organic art. Male khepri, on the other hand, are lobster-sized, non-sentient scarabs, without the depending humanoid body. They mate by latching onto a female's head scarab and fertilizing her. Taken from the Egyptian god of the same name.

==== Scabmettler ====
Stocky, gray-skinned human-like beings whose blood, when shed, congeals immediately into a solid protective layer. Using a special herb which delays coagulation, the Scabmettlers are able to mold the blood into elaborate armor. They practice a unique form of martial, arena combat called mortu crutt, which emphasises pounding, hammer-like strikes, as edged weapons are nearly useless against them due to their rapid coagulation.

==== Stiltspear ====
Driven to near-extinction after the railroad destroyed their indigenous swamp lands, the Stiltspear were a race of quadrupedal creatures with insect-like legs and radially symmetrical hands that can be closed into spears, with which they hunt. They secrete thaumaturgons from their glands, which gives them the ability to camouflage themselves in the forest. They possess mystical abilities, including the ability to create golems through somaturgy, and can employ a chant-like singing to "unstick time", which aids in their hunting.

==== Strider ====
Striders, (known more formally as Borinatch) are a "proud race" whose bodies roughly resemble centaurs. However, their legs are as tall as an average human, and their faces resemble a cross between a baboon, insect, and wood-carving. They seem to live in small nomadic bands rather than cities, and these groups are led by a queen. Most notably, Striders seem to partially phase into and out of solid existence; said to be "dimensionally disrespectful," parts of their bodies may seem to vanish or not interact with ordinary matter in predictable ways.

==== Thanati ====
The thanati of High Cromlech are the overlords of the city, a caste of undead nobility. Mieville describes them as "liches with sewn-shut mouths, with beautiful clothes and skin like preserved leather."

==== Vampir ====
The vampir are vampires, possessing great speed and strength, forked tongues, certain magical powers, and capable of living indefinitely. Vampirism on Bas-Lag is caused by a bacterium, and the technical term for the "disease" is photophobic haemophagy.

==== Vodyanoi ====
The vodyanoi are an aquatic people. They are fat and froglike, with webbed feet and toes. They are skilled in "watercraeft", water magics, able to fashion temporarily solid objects out of water. Vodyanoi ordinarily cannot survive out of water for more than a day, and do not swim in salt water. Taken from Russian folklore.

==== Weavers ====
Large, multidimensional spider-like beings who regard life on Bas-Lag as an ongoing work of art. They use their considerable powers to interfere with events according to their individual sense of aesthetics. Weavers speak in a disjointed, babbling flow of half-poetry, and are totally unpredictable.

==== Wyrmen ====
Wyrmen are semi-sentient flying creatures that look something like gargoyles. They are no more than a foot tall, with bright red skin and small bat wings. They are crude, vulgar, and laugh at anything and everything. They have a limited capacity for speech and are sometimes used by other races for reconnaissance and running errands.

==== Other races ====
Many races of Bas-Lag are only briefly mentioned in passing. The Llorgiss are a tri-faceted, barrel-shaped race. The Gessin are said to be large, and might wear armor. Menfish are some sort of newt/merman aquatic race. A reference is made to "crustaceans walking on two legs and cowled like monks, figures with too many eyes." A race of waist-high insect people were mentioned in Iron Council. The races "Vu-murt" and "Corokanth" were named, but the races were not described.

=== Remade ===
The Remade are usually, but not always, the victims of the criminal justice system. Rather than imprisoning criminals, the city of New Crobuzon will send them to punishment factories, where "bio-thaumaturges" warp and twist their bodies in a variety of ways. Some are combined with machines, to enslave them to one particular purpose. Others have bizarre limbs or organs grafted onto their bodies, making them freaks of nature. The Remade are primarily a sad, pathetic lot. However, some Remade, like the infamous Jack Half-A-Prayer, have used their remaking to their benefit, becoming vigilante heroes and styling themselves as "fReemade".

== Science, technology and magic ==
The technology on Bas-Lag is wide and varied and evolves over the course of the books. In Perdido Street Station the primary piece of weaponry is the flintlock musket; by the time of Iron Council militia are armed with what appears to be percussion cap weaponry in the form of motorguns and pepperpot revolvers.

On pg. 229 of Perdido Street Station Isaac states: "That's where they dropped the colourbomb in 1545. That's what they said put an end to the Pirate Wars, but to be honest with you, Yag, they'd been over for a year before that [...]". In Iron Council, the science behind colourbombs is referred to as a "lost science."

Another power source is The Torque, mentioned on pg. 225, a mysterious energy plaguing the Cacotopic Stain that might be compared to radiation. Torque leads to strange mutations, altering both living creatures and the inanimate environment: for example, during Iron Council, a railway carriage and its three occupants are transmogrified by the Torque into a blob of semi-solid matter containing three nuclei. Another implication of dropping the colourbomb is that it was done to hide the extent of the torque weapon's devastation of city of Suroch, which was later revealed to be the unnamed opponent in the Pirate Wars.

In all three novels there are also several mentions of clockwork gems, metaclockwork, sentient robot-like constructs operating with difference engines, and many other inexplicable or fantastic instances of science, magic and combination of both.

In Iron Council, Miéville dedicates a lot of attention to the magic art of golemancy, explaining the logic behind the art and its difference to the calling and control of elementals.
