= Liam Creagh =

Northern Irish journalist and businessman (born 1959)

Liam Creagh (born 1959), is a Northern Irish broadcast journalist and businessman.

Born in Belfast in 1959, Creagh is the son of Kate and Jim Creagh, also a journalist. His brother Fr. Kieran Creagh is a Passionist priest. Liam Creagh attended St Mary's Christian Brothers Grammar School in Belfast.

Creagh worked for the Belfast Telegraph, before moving into television. He worked for the BBC, GMTV, RTÉ before becoming the Ireland Correspondent for Sky News.

Creagh is now the owner and director of RedBox Media. His company makes news features and documentaries and provides news and current affairs cover for local and international outlets. He is also on the board of Ireland Air Ambulance.

== Films and documentaries ==
- Titanic: Born in Belfast, William MacQuitty (Actor), Liam Creagh (Director), RedBox, Produced for UTV (2012).
- Ruby (fiction), directed by Michael Creagh, produced by Liam Creagh and Damon Quinn, Redbox Media.
