= Robert A. Saunders =

American geopolitician

Robert A. Saunders is the Distinguished Professor (2023) in the Department of History, Politics, and Geography at Farmingdale State College, State University of New York. His interests include geopolitics, national identity, and popular culture.

He holds a B.A. in history from the University of Florida, an M.A. in history from the Stony Brook University, and a Ph.D in Global Affairs from Rutgers University (2005).

== Works ==
In addition to publications in journals such as Political Geography, Politics, Geopolitics, Millennium, Nations and Nationalism, and Slavic Review, he authored several books:

- 2020: Geopolitics, Northern Europe, and Nordic Noir: What Television Series Tell Us About World Politics (Routledge)
- 2010: Historical Dictionary of the Russian Federation (with Vlad Strukov; Scarecrow Press, ISBN 0810854759)
  - 2019: Historical Dictionary of the Russian Federation, 2 volumes (Bloomsbury, ISBN 9798216225386)
- 2017: Ethnopolitics in Cyberspace: The Internet, Minority Nationalism, and the Web of Identity
- 2016: Popular Geopolitics and Nation Branding in the Post-Soviet Realm (Routledge)
- 2008: The Many Faces of Sacha Baron Cohen: Politics, Parody, and the Battle Over Borat (Lexington Books)
  In 2006, Ken Silverstein labeled Saunders the "world's leading Boratologist".
- 2005: Unweaving the Web of Identity: Assessing the Internet's Impact on Identity Among National Minorities (Ruthers University; Ph.D. in Global Affairs)
