= Cray (surname) =

Cray is a surname. Notable people with the surname include:

- Chick Cray (1921–2008), English cricketer
- Dean Cray (born 1958), American politician
- Eric Cray (born 1988), Filipino track and field athlete
- Fred Cray (born 1957), American artist
- Graham Cray (born 1947), British retired Anglican bishop
- Robert Cray (born 1953), American blues musician
- Seymour Cray (1925–1996), American computer scientist and supercomputing pioneer

== See also ==
- McCray
