= Frank Creagh =

New Zealand boxer (1924–1998)

Personal information
- Born: Frank William Creagh; 5 May 1924
- Died: 5 July 1998 (aged 74)
Medal record
Representing New Zealand
Men's Boxing
British Empire Games
Gold medal – first place	1950 Auckland	Heavyweight

Frank William Creagh (5 May 1924 – 5 July 1998) was a New Zealand boxer.

He won the gold medal in the men's heavyweight division at the 1950 British Empire Games.
