= Michael Creagh (cricketer) =

New Zealand cricketer

Personal information
- Full name: Michael Clayton Creagh
- Born: 25 May 1845; Ireland
- Died: 27 May 1895 (aged 50); Dunedin, Otago, New Zealand

Domestic team information
- Years: Team
- 1866/67: Otago
- Source: ESPNcricinfo, 8 May 2016

Michael Clayton Creagh (25 May 1845 – 27 May 1895) was an Irish-born cricketer. He played one first-class match for Otago in New Zealand in the 1866–67 season.

Creagh was born in Ireland in 1845. He worked as a solicitor. He scored a single run in his only first-class match, a February 1867 fixture between Otago and Canterbury, the only first-class match played in New Zealand during the season. He died at Dunedin in 1895 aged 50.
