= Karel Thole =

Dutch painter

Karel Thole at 1971 Worldcon (Noreascon One)

Carolus Adrianus Maria Thole (Dutch: [ˈtoːlə]; 20 April 1914 – 26 March 2000) was a Dutch-Italian painter and illustrator.

== Biography ==
He was born in Bussum, near Amsterdam, and was educated at State Drawing School of Amsterdam's Rijksmuseum.

His first works were for advertisement and publishing companies, but he also painted glasses and walls. In the 1930s, Thole made many antisemitic cartoons for the magazine of Dutch fascist party Zwart Front. In 1958 Thole moved to Milan, Italy, with his wife and four sons. At first he worked for Rizzoli publisher, before passing to Mondadori in 1960. After several covers for various magazines and books, he became renowned for his long work for science fiction magazine Urania, where his deep art culture, taste for surrealism and weird sense of humour could show at their best. For Mondadori he worked to a host of other series, including mysteries and romantic series for women.

In 1980s Thole experienced an eye disease that compelled him to reduce his work activity and to leave Urania covers to Vicente Segrelles and Oscar Chichoni. His last work for Urania is for N°1330 of 1998: in the meantime, Thole earned a robust fame as one of the greatest European book cover artists. He worked also for French and German publishers.

Thole died in 2000 in Cannobio, a town on the Lago Maggiore in Northern Italy.

== See also ==
All Urania covers from n°233 to n°1080 Karel Thole Covers
