= Mercenary (disambiguation) =

Mercenary is an adjective meaning "motivated by private gain". It is also a noun: a mercenary is a person primarily concerned with making money at the expense of ethics, most often used to refer to a soldier who fights for hire.

Mercenary or mercenaries may also refer to:

== Films and television ==
- The Mercenaries, also known as Dark of the Sun, a 1968 film starring Rod Taylor
- The Mercenary (film), a 1968 spaghetti western film
- Mercenary (1996 film), a 1996 movie featuring Robert Pine
- Mercenary (2008 film), a 2008 short film starring Billy Lush
- Mercenaries (2011 film), a 2011 British film
- Mercenaries (2014 film), an American action film
- Mercenary (2016 film), a 2016 French film
- The Mercenary, a 2019 American film starring Dominique Vandenberg
- "The Mercenaries" (Mission: Impossible), a 1968 episode from Season 3 of Mission: Impossible

== Games ==
- Mercenary (board game), a board game about conquest set in medieval Europe published by Fantasy Games Unlimited in 1975
- Mercenary (video game), a 1985 computer game by Novagen Software Ltd.
  - Mercenary III, a 1992 sequel
- Mercenaries: Playground of Destruction, a 2005 Xbox and PlayStation 2 video game
  - Mercenaries (series)
  - Mercenaries 2: World in Flames, a 2008 sequel to Mercenaries: Playground of Destruction
  - Mercs Inc, a cancelled sequel to Mercenaries 2: World in Flames
- MechWarrior 2: Mercenaries, a 1996 computer game by Activision
  - MechWarrior 4: Mercenaries, a 2002 computer game by Cyberlore Studios and FASA Studio
- Mercenaries_Saga_Chronicles, a 2018 collection of three previous Mercenaries Saga games
- Traveller Book 4: Mercenary, a rulebook of the Traveller role-playing game series

== Literature ==
- El Mercenario (English: The Mercenary), a 1980–2003 graphic novel by Vicente Segrelles
- The Mercenaries, a 1998 novel by Ed Greenwood

== Music ==
- Mercenary (band), a heavy metal band from Denmark
- Mercenary (album), a 1998 album by the band Bolt Thrower
- "Mercenary", a song by Brave Saint Saturn from the 2008 album Anti-Meridian
- "Mercenary", a song by The Mission from the 1990 album Grains of Sand
- "Mercenary", a song by Panic! at the Disco from the 2012 album Batman: Arkham City – The Album
- "Mercenary", a song by The Go-Go's from the 1984 album Talk Show
- "Mercenaries (Ready For War)", a song by John Cale from the 1979 album Sabotage/Live
- "The Mercenary", a song by Iron Maiden from the 2000 album Brave New World
- "Mercenary", A song by Crystal Castles from their 2012 album III

== Sports ==
- Mercenaries (basketball), a basketball club from Zimbabwe

== See also ==
- The Mercenary (disambiguation)
- Mercenary War
- Marburg Mercenaries, an American football team from Marburg, Germany
