= List of science fiction and fantasy literary awards =

This is a list of science fiction and fantasy awards for literature.

== A ==
- Aelita Prize
- Andre Norton Award
- Arthur C. Clarke Award
- Aurealis Award
- Author Emeritus

== B ==
- Balrog Award
- Bradbury Award
- Bram Stoker Award
- British Fantasy Award
- BSFA Award

== C ==
- Chesley Awards
- Compton Crook Award
- Crawford Award

== D ==
- Damon Knight Memorial Grand Master Award
- Darrell Awards
- Ditmar Award
- Double Gammas
- The Dragon Awards
- Dwarf Stars Award

== E ==
- Endeavour Award
- Eugie Award

== F ==
- First Fandom Hall of Fame Award

== G ==
- Gandalf Award
- Gaylactic Spectrum Awards
- Geffen Award
- Golden Duck Award

== H ==
- Hugo Award

== I ==
- International Fantasy Award
- Isaac Asimov Awards

== J ==
- James Tiptree, Jr. Award
- James White Award
- Japan Fantasy Novel Award
- John W. Campbell Award for Best New Writer
- John W. Campbell Memorial Award for Best Science Fiction Novel
- Jupiter Award

== K ==
- Kurd-Laßwitz-Preis

== L ==
- Lewis Carroll Shelf Award
- Locus Award

== M ==
- Mythopoeic Awards

== N ==
- Nebula Award

== P ==
- Philip K. Dick Award
- Pilgrim Award
- Premio Omelas
- Prix Aurora Awards
- Prix Tour-Apollo Award
- Prometheus Award

== R ==
- Ray Bradbury Prize
- Robert A. Heinlein Award
- Rhysling Award

== S ==
- Science Fiction & Fantasy Translation Awards
- Seiun Award
- Sense of Gender Awards
- Shirley Jackson Award
- Sidewise Award for Alternate History
- Sir Julius Vogel Award
- Sunburst Award

== T ==
- Tähtifantasia Award
- Tähtivaeltaja Award
- Theodore Sturgeon Award

== W ==
- World Fantasy Award
- Writers of the Future
- WSFA Small Press Award
