= The Mercenary =

The Mercenary may refer to:

- The Mercenary (film), a 1968 film directed by Sergio Corbucci
- The Mercenary, a 2019 American film starring Dominique Vandenberg
- A novel by Jerry Pournelle, included in The Prince omnibus
- Luc Poirier, a professional wrestler who wrestled as The Mercenary
- Ron Fuller (wrestler), a professional wrestler who wrestled as The Mercenary
- El Mercenario, also known as The Mercenary, a Spanish comic series
- A player character class in the Team Fortress 2 mod Open Fortress

== See also ==
- Mercenary (disambiguation)
