= Francesco Verso =

Italian science fiction writer and translator

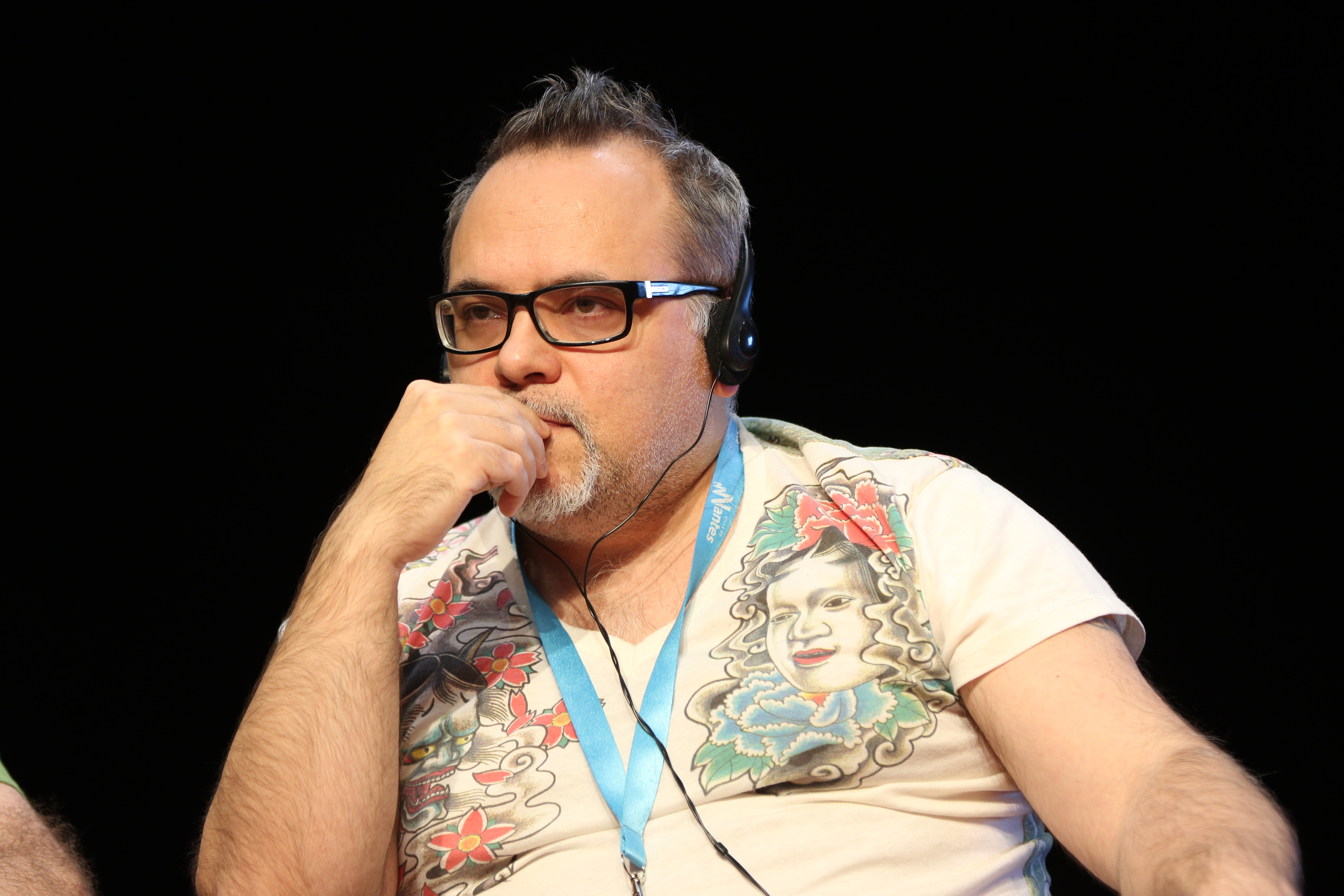
- Born: Bologna, Italy
- Education: Environmental Economics
- Alma mater: Roma Tre University
- Occupation: Novelist
- Writing career
- Period: 1996–2001
- Genre: Science fiction
- Notable awards: Urania Award 2009 2015
- Literary movement: Future Fiction

Francesco Verso is an Italian science fiction writer and translator of science fiction from English into Italian. Born in Bologna, Italy, he lives and works in Rome.

== Biography ==
After earning a degree in Environmental economics from Roma Tre University in 2001, Verso started working for IBM in the personal computer division. He stayed on in 2005 when that division became Lenovo, the Chinese PC multinational technology company. He left Lenovo in 2008.

He started writing in 1996, first poems and then the novel Antidoti umani, which was nominated for a 2004 Urania Award. In 2008 he received an honorable mention at the Premio Internazionale di Poesia for "Mario Luzi" In 2009 he won the Urania Award with the novel Il fabbricante di sorrisi, published in the I romanzi di Urania series with the title e-Doll.

In 2010, he finished his third novel, Livido, and the short stories "Flush", "Dodici centesimi", "Sogno di un futuro di mezza estate", "Due mondi", and "La morte in diretta di Fernando Morales". In 2011 he finished the novel Bloodbusters and began writing I camminatori. In 2012 his novel, Livido, won the Premio Odissea.

His novel Livido also won the Premio Cassiopea in 2014, and received the Premio Italia for best Italian science fiction novel. During the same year, the novel's Australian rights Australian publisher Xoum, and it was published in English as Livid.

From 2011 to 2013 he worked with Kipple Officina Libraria as co-editor of the literature series Avatar. In 2014 he created the Future Fiction label, which specializes in publishing books in the science fiction genre originating from different countries, languages and cultures than Italy. In 2015 he won his second Urania Award with his novel Bloodbusters (equally placed with Sandro Battisti for the novel L'impero restaurato).

In 2018 he won an Italia Award as best editor for the series of book published on Future Fiction.

In 2019 he received at the Refesticon Convention in Montenegro the Golden Dragon Award (Zlatni Zmaj) for achievements in the development of Science Fiction Literature.

== Works ==
=== Novels ===
- Antidoti umani, Edizioni Diversa Sintonia, 2009 ISBN 8896086043; Kipple Officina Libraria, 2011 ISBN 9788895414843 (finalist at the Urania Award 2004)
- e-Doll, Mondadori, 2009; Kipple Officina Libraria, 2012 (winner of Urania Award 2009); Future Fiction series, Mincione Edizioni, 2015
- Livido, Odissea Fantascienza, Delos Books, June 2013 ISBN 9788865304099 (Premio Odissea 2013, Premio Cassiopea 2014, Premio Italia 2014 as best Italian SF novel)
- Nexhuman (aka Livid), translated by Sally McCorry, Xoum Publishing, Sydney, October 2014 ISBN 9781921134906
- Bloodbusters, Monadori 2015; (winner of Urania Award 2015 equally placed with L'impero restaurato by Sandro Battisti)

=== Short stories ===
- "La spirale del silenzio, in Robot 58, Delos Books, 2009
- "Flush", "Kipple", "Avatar Capsule 3", 2010; iComics nr. 4, Kawama Editoriale, December 2010; in AA.VV., 50 Sfumature di Sci-fi, La Mela Avvelenata, 2013
- "Sogno di un futuro di mezza estate", Kipple, Avatar eCaspule 7, 2011 – finalist at Premio Italia 2012, category professional publication short story
- "Italianski, tikaj, tikaj", in Scritto... e mangiato: racconti di vita e di sapori, Premio Racconto Bonsai 2011, Giulio Perrone LAB, Roma, 2011
- "12 centesimi", iComics nr. 14, Kawama Editoriale, 2012
- "Due mondi", Future Fiction, Mincione Edizioni, 2014
- "Formattazioni celesti", in the anthology I sogni di Cartesio, edited by Giuseppe Panella and Luca Ortino, Edizioni della Vigna, 2013
- "Il livello dell'assassino", FantasyMagazine n.8, DelosBooks, 2013
- "La morte in diretta di Fernando Morales", Graphe.it edizioni, Perugia 2011 ISBN 9788897010128 (now "La morte di Fernando Morales", Future Fiction, Mincione Edizioni 2015)
- "Italianskij tikaj tikaj", Nell'antologia ma gli androidi mangiano spaghetti electrici, edited by Francesco Grasso, Massimo Mongai and Marco Minicangeli, Edizioni della Vigna, 2015
- "Bloodbusters", short story in the anthology NexStream – Oltre il confine dei generi, edited by Giovanni De Matteo, Kipple Officina Libraria, 2015
- "iMate", written together with Francesco Mantovani, Future Fiction, Mincione Edizioni 2016

=== Short Stories translated to English ===
- "Flush", translation by Georgia Emma Gili, Future Fiction, Mincione Edizioni 2014
- "Two Worlds", translation by Sally McCorry, Future Fiction, Mincione Edizioni, 2014
- "Two Worlds", International Speculative Fiction n.5
- "Fernando Morales, This is Your Death!", translation by Sally McCorry, Future Fiction, Mincione Edizioni 2015
- "Celestial Formatting", translation by Georgia Emma Gili, Chicago Quarterly Review, CreateSpace, 2015

=== Translations ===
- Aethra / L'altra mamma by Michalis Manolios, winner of Aeon Award 2011, Future Fiction, Mincione Edizioni 2014
- La mano servita by Robert J. Sawyer, finalist at Hugo Award, Aurora and Arthur Ellis 1998, Future Fiction, Mincione Edizioni 2014
- La casa di Bernardo by James Patrick Kelly, Future Fiction, Mincione Edizioni 2014
- Big Bang Larissa / Caso 74 by Cristian M. Teodorescu, Future Fiction, Mincione Edizioni 2014
- Risoluzione 23 by Efe Tokunbo, Future Fiction, Mincione Edizioni 2014
- Eravamo pazzi di gioia by David Marusek, Future Fiction, Mincione Edizioni 2014
- Mono no Aware e altre storie by Ken Liu, Future Fiction, Mincione Edizioni 2015
- Le bolle di Yuanyuan by Liu Cixin, Future Fiction, Mincione Edizioni 2016

=== Theater Adaptations ===
- "Formattazioni celesti" in The Milky Way, SF show edited by Katiuscia Magliarisi, Chiarà Condrò and Simone de Filippis.
- "La morte in diretta di Fernando Morales" in The Milky Way, SF show edited by Katiuscia Magliarisi, Chiarà Condrò and Simone de Filippis.
- e-Doll during the festival Da Mieli a Queer, a theater adaptation of the Dungeon scene: starring Berenice Cubarskij with Katiuscia Magliarisi as Angel and Daniele Ferranti as the butler.

=== Audiobooks ===
- "Flush", Fantastica Series vol.1, L.A. Case Production, February 2013

=== Other publications ===
- Tre utopie letterarie in Citymakers, "Libreria di Transarchitettura" series, edited by Emmanuele Pilia, Deleyva Editore, 2013
- As editor, anthology Storie dal domani: I migliori racconti Future Fiction 2014, Future Fiction, Mincione Edizioni, 2015
- As editor, anthology Storie dal domani 2: I migliori racconti Future Fiction 2015, Future Fiction, Mincione Edizioni, 2016
- As editor (with Roberto Paura), anthology Segnali dal Futuro, Italian Institute for the Future, 2016
- As editor, anthology Storie dal domani 3: I migliori racconti Future Fiction 2016, Future Fiction, Mincione Edizioni, 2017
- As editor, anthology Storie dal domani 4: I migliori racconti Future Fiction 2017, Future Fiction 2018
- As editor, anthology Storie dal domani 5: I migliori racconti Future Fiction 2018, Future Fiction 2019
- As co-editor with Bill Campbell, anthology Future Fiction: New Directions in International Science Fiction Rosarium Publishing 2018

=== Awards ===
- 2004 – Finalist at Urania Awards for Antidoti Umani
- 2008 – Honorable mention at the Premio Internazionale di Poesia for Mario Luzi
- 2009 – Winner of Urania Award for e-Doll
- 2011 – Winner of Premio Italia, with Sandro Battisti, for the best amateur fanzine, NeXT.
- 2012 – Finalist at Premio Italia – category short story on professional publication – "Sogno di un futuro di mezza estate", Kipple, Collana Avatar eCaspule 7, 2011
- 2013 – Winner of Premio Odissea for Livido
- 2013 – Special Mention at Premio Robot for the short story "Il livello dell'assassino"
- 2014 – Winner of Premio Cassiopea for Livido
- 2014 – Winner of Premio Italia for Livido as best Italian SF novel
- 2015 – Winner of Urania Award for Bloodbusters (equally placed with Sandro Battisti for L'impero restaurato)
- 2018 - Winner of Premio Italia (Best editor)
- 2019 - Golden Dragon Award (Zlatni Zmaj)
- 2019 - Winner of Best Publisher Award by the European Science Fiction Society for Future Fiction
- 2022 - Winner of Best Author Award by the European Science Fiction Society
- 2022 - Winner of Best Written Work of Fiction Award by the European Science Fiction Society for "Futurespotting"
