= The Enclave (disambiguation) =

The Enclave may refer to:

- enclaves
- The Enclave: a 2002 made-for-TV movie about the fall of Srebrenica and the Dutch government's failure to protect the town from attackers.
- The Enclave, a now-defunct American record label.
- A group of enemies in the Fallout video game series. Introduced in Fallout 2
- an award-winning short story by Anne Charnock
