= Franco Brambilla =

Franco Brambilla may refer to

- Franco Brambilla (nuncio) (1923–2003), Vatican diplomat
- Franco Giulio Brambilla (born 1949), Roman Catholic bishop of Novara and theologian
- Franco Brambilla (illustrator) (born 1967), Italian science fiction illustrator
- Franco Brambilla (1922–1942), Italian child actor in The Old Guard (1934)
