= Massimo Citi =

Italian writer

Massimo Citi (born 1955) is an Italian science fiction writer and reviewer. He was born in Brescia, in Lombardy in northern Italy, and has published a number of stories on various magazines and anthologies. He is a co-editor of the literary magazine LN LibriNuovi, a co-editor of the yearly anthology, Fata Morgana, and manages a bookstore.

He won the Premio Omelas 2002 which Amnesty International Italia devoted to science fiction and human rights.
