= Altri Mondi =

Science fiction book series

Altri Mondi (or Altrimondi, Italian for "Other Worlds") was an Italian collection of science fiction novels published by Arnoldo Mondadori Editore from 1986 to 1993.

The first number was the Italian translation of Robots and Empire by Isaac Asimov (May 1986). Other authors published included Alfred Bester, William Gibson, Robert A. Heinlein, Robert Silverberg, Lucius Shepard.

Covers were initially painted by Vicente Segrelles, soon replaced by the Argentine Oscar Chichoni.
