= Julian West =

Julian West may refer to:

- Julian West (author), author of Vita Brevis Ars Longa and winner of James White Award
- Julian West, stage name for Nicolas de Gunzburg in the 1932 film Vampyr
- Julian West, the main character of Edward Bellamy's novel Looking Backward
