= Douglas Adams's Starship Titanic: A Novel =

1997 novel by Terry Jones

Douglas Adams's Starship Titanic
- Author: Terry Jones
- Publisher: Harmony Books, Pan Books, Ballantine Books
- Publication date: October 1997
- Pages: 256 (first edition)

Douglas Adams's Starship Titanic is a novel written by Terry Jones, based on the game Starship Titanic conceived by Douglas Adams. The novel was published in October 1997 by Harmony Books and Pan Books, and in November 1998 by Ballantine Books.

The author, Terry Jones, based it on an outline provided by Douglas Adams. Jones, famous for his work with Monty Python, was the voice actor for the parrot character in the original game. Adams initially intended to write the adaptation himself, but was too focused on the game. Robert Sheckley was then approached to write it, but his submitted work was rejected by The Digital Village in Autumn 1997 because it was too different from Adams's writing style.Michael Bywater offered to write the novel after Sheckley abandoned the project, but, due to fears that Bywater would not complete the book on schedule, Adams ultimately asked Jones to write it as publishers expected the book's release to tie in with that of its source material (which itself ended up being delayed). Because of a tight schedule and postponing of the novel, Jones had to write it in the five weeks before its release date. The book sold about 80,000 copies. Gerald Jonas of The New York Times Book Review wrote that Jones "successfully mimics Adams's antic style", but that the novel lacks the qualities that made Hitchhiker's Guide to the Galaxy series "memorable". However, Publishers Weekly praised the book, describing it as a "rich medium of whimsy and satire" and writing that it succeeds in making readers laugh. Reviewing the novel for School Library Journal, Robin Defendall also praised it and wrote that "it will be popular with [Jones's and Adams's] many fans".

== Synopsis and plot ==
At the centre of the galaxy, an unknown civilisation is preparing for an event of epic proportions, the launch of the most technologically advanced spaceship ever built – the Starship Titanic, the ship that cannot possibly go wrong, based on an idea of a cruise ship starship disaster mentioned by Adams in the novel Life, the Universe and Everything.

In the novel, the ship is sabotaged by Antar Brobostigan and his accountant Droot Scraliontis as part of an insurance fraud, and undergoes a Spontaneous Massive Existence Failure, crashing on Earth and recruiting three humans to help repair it. Similarly to the game, the main characters seek to upgrade their class status and fix the ship's central computer. The novel also includes subplots involving the on-board bomb and a love triangle between two of the human characters and a journalist from the planet Blerontin.

== Releases ==
- ISBN 978-0-609601037 (13-digit)
- ISBN 0330354469 (10-digit)
- ISBN 978-0-330354462 (13-digit)

An audiobook was released in November 1997. Trudi Miller Rosenblum of Billboard praised the audiobook's execution as "hilarious" and added that "there are plenty of wacky details and funny one-liners".

In 2007, it was re-released as an e-book. A new edition was published in the UK in 2023 by Pan Macmillan.

== Adaptation ==
In December 2021, BBC Radio 4 broadcast a radio dramatisation, Starship Titanic, featuring Michael Palin and Simon Jones, who originally played Arthur Dent. It was adapted by Ian Billings and directed by Dirk Maggs, who also directed the last four series of The Hitchhiker's Guide to the Galaxy radio series.
