= Il castello di Eymerich =

2001 book written by Valerio Evangelisti

- Author: Valerio Evangelisti
- Language: Italian
- Series: Eymerich series
- Genre: Historical fantasy novel
- Publisher: Mondadori Editore
- Publication date: 2001
- Publication place: Italy
- Media type: Print
- Preceded by: Picatrix, la scala per l'inferno
- Followed by: Mater Terribilis

Il castello di Eymerich ("Eymerich's Castle") is a book written by Valerio Evangelisti, an Italian historian and writer of historical fantasy. In chronological order, it is the seventh book in a best-selling series whose central character is Nicholas Eymerich, an inquisitor of the Spanish Inquisition - a historical character, whom Evangelisti adopted to his novels following a detailed research of sources concerning Emerych's figure. It has been translated into many languages, most notably German, French, Spanish and Portuguese.

== Plot summary ==
The plot of the book is divided into three threads:

=== The main thread ===
Takes place in Montiel in Castile, Spain, in 1369, during the civil war between king Peter of Castile and pretender Henry of Trastamara. Peter of Castile is defending Montiel, besieged by the pretender's forces, which consist mostly of mercenaries commanded by a historical figure Bertrand du Guesclin. Inquisitor Nicholas Eymerich is called in to investigate the use of black magic by the besiegers and the use of cabal by the defenders.

=== "The five men from Girona" ===
This thread takes place prior to the main one. It depicts a group of Dominicans sent by the Pope to the Castle of Montiel in a mission to use demonology against cabalistic magic .

=== "The Chosen One" ===
Takes place during World War II in a concentration camp Dora, where Sturmbannführer SS Viktor von Ingolstadt is conducting an experiment to revive a dead body to support his quasi-scientific research concerning electricity.
