= Gary Gibson (author) =

Scottish writer

- Born: 1965 (age 60–61); Glasgow, Scotland, United Kingdom
- Education: Glasgow Caledonian University
- Occupation: Science fiction writer (formerly graphic designer)
- Writing career
- Notable works: Angel Stations; Against Gravity; The Shoal sequence (Stealing Light, Nova War, Empire of Light)
- Website: whitescreenofdespair.blogspot.com

Gary Gibson (born in 1965) is a science fiction author from Glasgow, Scotland.

== Life ==
After studying Sociology, History and Politics at the Glasgow Caledonian University, Gary Gibson worked as a "small press" comics magazine editor before following courses in desktop publishing and design and subsequently freelancing as a graphic designer.

After marrying Emma, Gibson relocated to Taiwan before moving back to Glasgow in 2010.

== Writing ==
Gary Gibson has been writing since the age of fourteen and has published seventeen novels to date, four of which linked to each other to form the "Shoal Sequence".

He is a member of the Glasgow Science Fiction Writers Circle.

=== Publishing history ===
After publishing some short stories Gary Gibson saw his first novel, Angel Stations, released in 2004 by Tor, that was nominated in 2005 by the British Fantasy Society for the award for best novel of the year, which was eventually won by Stephen King with The Dark Tower VII: The Dark Tower.

He followed up the following year with Against Gravity, also nominated by the British Fantasy Society for the award for best novel of the year, won that year by Neil Gaiman's Anansi Boys.

In 2007 Gibson published Stealing Light, the first novel of the trilogy The Shoal Sequence. The series introduced the characters of Dakota Merrick, Lucas Corso and the alien Trader-in-Faecal-Matter-of-Animals, a fish-like member of the Shoal race, who rule all inhabited space through their exclusive knowledge of the secret of faster-than-light travel. The novels involve a discovery regarding the origins of this technology. Stealing Light was followed in 2009 by Nova War, in 2010 by Empire of Light, and in 2013 by Marauder.

In 2011 Gibson published Final Days, the first installment of "The Final Days" series. And in 2012 Gibson published The Thousand Emperors, the second book in "The Final Days" series

In 2014 Gibson published Extinction Game, the first installment of a new series.

== Other activities ==
Gary Gibson plays guitar. He also keeps a blog called White Screen of Despair and a profile on Twitter.

== Bibliography ==
Standalone Novels

- Angel Stations. London: Tor, 2004 (paper). ISBN 1-4050-3445-9
- Against Gravity. London: Tor, 2005 (paper). ISBN 1-4050-3446-7
- Ghost Frequencies. NewCon Press, 2018. ISBN 978-1-910-93580-4
- Devil's Road. Gary Gibson, 2020. ISBN 978-9-574-36460-2
- Proxy. Brain in a Jar Books, 2022. ISBN 978-9860677034
- Europa Deep. Brain in a Jar Books, 2023. ISBN 978-9860677058

The Shoal Sequence

- Stealing Light. London: Tor, 2007. ISBN 0-230-70040-3
- Nova War. London: Tor, 2009. ISBN 0-230-70680-0
- Empire of Light. London: Tor, 2010. ISBN 0-230-70681-9
- Marauder. London: Tor, 2013. ISBN 0-230-74890-2

The Final Days

- Final Days. London: Tor, 2011. ISBN 978-0-230-74877-4
- The Thousand Emperors. London: Tor, 2012. ISBN 0-230-74878-3

The Apocalypse Trilogy

- Extinction Game. London: Tor, 2014.
- Survival Game. London: Tor, 2016. ISBN 978-0-230-77278-6
- Doomsday Game. Glasgow: Gary Gibson, 2019. ISBN 978-9-574-36459-6

The Echogenesis Series

- Echogenesis. Brain in a Jar Books, 2021. ISBN 978-9-860-67701-0
- Xenopraxis. Brain in a Jar Books, 2025. ISBN 978-9860677089
- Echoterminus. Brain in a Jar Books, 2026. ISBN 978-6269303205

Collections

- Scienceville and Other Lost Worlds. Brain in a Jar Books, 2018. ISBN 978-1-980-48127-0
- Butterfly Box and Other Stories. Brain in a Jar Books, 2024. ISBN 978-9860677072
