= Glasgow Science Fiction Writers' Circle =

Writing Group in Glasgow, Scotland

The Glasgow Science Fiction Writers’ Circle (GSFWC, aka "The Circle") is a group of amateur, semi-professional, and professional fiction authors that has met regularly in Glasgow, Scotland since 1987.

The purpose of the Circle is to provide a supportive, non-confrontational setting in which an individual's work can be reviewed, critiqued, and discussed. The group's underlying emphasis on quality and professionalism has, in recent years, contributed to the commercial publication of novels and/or short story collections by members including Amal El-Mohtar, Cameron Johnston, E.M. Faulds, Eliza Chan, Elaine Gallagher, Michael Cobley, Hal Duncan, Gary Gibson, and Neil Williamson. Members have also had work published in magazines including Analog, Asimov's Science Fiction, Interzone, and The Third Alternative, and short story anthologies Nova Scotia: New Scottish Speculative Fiction, Other Edens II, Shipbuilding, and Year's Best Fantasy and Horror.

== History ==
The origins of the Circle lie in a science fiction short story competition – originally suggested by the SF writer Chris Boyce – that ran for several years in The Glasgow Herald newspaper (now, The Herald). The winning entry was published in the weekend edition of the newspaper that coincided with what had effectively become, at that time, a local annual science fiction convention known as Albacon.

In 1986, Ann Karkalas of the University of Glasgow Adult & Continuing Education Department contacted the competition's judge, the writer (and the Herald's then-Science Fiction reviewer) Duncan Lunan, about the possibility of starting a science fiction writing evening class. Both knew each other previously from the Glasgow Science Fiction Circle, a group of readers and writers which had met during the 1960s and 1970s. Duncan was willing to teach the course, and indeed the classes would go on to run for the best part of a decade.

Many of those who attend the first year's class were so enthusiastic about writing that – once the class finished – they wanted to continue meeting. So they did; at the suggestion of Lunan, this new group began to refer to itself as the Glasgow Science Fiction Writers Circle, although the group remains remarkably anarchic and non-hierarchical in form.

Although the Circle's early membership largely overlapped with that of the evening classes, the two entities gradually became more distinct. After the evening classes were ended, the Circle has continued to attract new members through word of mouth, brochure entries, and its own website.

Having survived several changes of venue, frequency of meetings and an almost complete turnover of members, the Circle currently meets every second Tuesday. Venues have included St Aloysius Church, the Glasgow Film Theatre, the city's branch of Border's bookshop, and a smaller function room of a Glasgow church.

== Structure ==
The Circle's workshops are neither instructor-led nor formally arranged. Although the group does follow a set routine (modeled on the Milford Method, wherein each person who has read the story gives their comments before the author's final "right of reply" at the end of the session), the meetings are democratic in nature. The Circle does not engage in creative writing exercises: each meeting focuses specifically on the constructive criticism of an individual work, be it a short story, novella, or novel that has previously been distributed by email or via the Circle's newsgroup. This said, many members of the Circle do also regularly socialise with each other outside of these official meetings.

In late 2009, some members of the Circle established a spoken word performance group called Word Dogs. This ran irregular events in and around Glasgow, such as a special horror-themed evening around Halloween 2010.

== Other groups ==
During its history the Circle has seldom interacted with other writers groups in and around Glasgow, thanks to its focused working practices and – arguably – its championing of genre fiction. As a result, probably its closest links have been with members of the East Coast SF Writers Group (ECSFWG). This group shared a common origin, having originally been formed as a gathering of some east coast-based entrants to the same Glasgow Herald Science Fiction Short Story Competition.

A more recent offshoot from ECSFWG is the Writers' Bloc spoken word group, with whom members of the Circle have performed in special joint events.

== Published works ==
Since its inception, the circle has sponsored, or otherwise caused to be written, a number of anthologies. These are composed of original works, most often short stories, by its members. The books typically commemorate an occasion, but the most recent was published to raise money for a charitable cause.

- Shipbuilding: New SF from Scotland (1995). Published for the 53rd World Science Fiction Convention in Glasgow.
- Thirty Years of Rain (2016). (ISBN 9781326753429) To celebrate the thirtieth anniversary of the Glasgow Sf Writers' Circle.
- Flotation Device: A Charity Anthology (2020). To support charities fighting COVID-19/coronavirus.
- GALLUS: A Glasgow SF Writers' Circle anthology (2024)
