= Man and the Planets =

Book by Duncan Lunan

- Author: Duncan Lunan
- Genre: Astronomy
- Publisher: Ashgrove Press
- Publication date: 1983
- ISBN: 9780906798171

Man and the Planets: The Resources of the Solar System is a book written by Duncan Lunan.

== Contents ==
Man and the Planets is a book published in 1983 which studies the resources of each planet in the Solar System.

== Reception ==
Dave Langford reviewed Man and the Planets for White Dwarf #41, and stated that "Lunan's enthusiasm is infectious, his research exhaustive; he's absolutely committed to the Dream of Space and has no time for the many equally learned people who fear that the expense of opening up this new frontier would wreck our world economy long before producing tangible benefits."

== Reviews ==
- Review by Tom Easton (1983) in Analog Science Fiction/Science Fact, November 1983
- Space Voyager
