= Michael Cobley =

British writer

- Born: 9 October 1959 (age 66); Leicester, England, United Kingdom
- Education: University of Strathclyde
- Occupation: Science fiction writer
- Writing career
- Notable works: Shadowking trilogy, Humanity's Fire series
- Website: www.michaelcobley.com

Michael Cobley (born 10 October 1959) is a British science fiction and fantasy author from Glasgow.

== Life ==
Michael Cobley was born in Leicester but moved to Glasgow at the age of seven. While studying engineering at the University of Strathclyde, he used to work as a DJ; at the same time, he wrote rants for the university paper under the pen-name of "Phaedrus".

He has published eight novels, a collection of short stories and several reviews and essays.

== Writing ==
Cobley, who is a member of the Glasgow Science Fiction Writers Circle, said he was influenced by writers such as Frank Herbert, David Brin, Iain Banks, Ken MacLeod and Vernor Vinge, but also by music (Dmitri Shostakovich, Yes, Blue Öyster Cult, Emerson, Lake & Palmer and Monster Magnet) and TV shows (Firefly, Babylon 5, the most recent series of Battlestar Galactica).

Cobley published his first novel, Shadowkings, in 2001 for Earthlight, an imprint of Simon & Schuster. He completed the "Shadowkings" trilogy with Shadowgod (2003) and Shadowmasque (2005), which was nominated for the British Fantasy Society's best novel award. Cobley then began writing a space opera series, "Humanity's Fire". It encompasses five novels as of 2018. The first volume, Seeds of Earth, was published in 2009 by Orbit Books.

== Bibliography ==
=== Novels ===
==== Shadowkings trilogy ====
- Shadowkings. London: Earthlight, 2001 (paper). ISBN 0-7432-0717-3
- Shadowgod. London: Earthlight, 2003 (paper). ISBN 0-7434-6114-2
- Shadowmasque. London: Simon & Schuster, 2005 (paper). ISBN 0-7432-5682-4

==== Humanity's Fire ====
All published as paperbacks by Orbit Books in London.

1. Seeds of Earth, 2009. ISBN 978-1-84149-632-0
2. The Orphaned Worlds, 2010. ISBN 978-1-84149-631-3
3. The Ascendant Stars, 2011. ISBN 978-1-84149-635-1
4. Ancestral Machines, 2016. ISBN 978-0-31622-118-4
5. Splintered Suns, 2018. ISBN 978-0-31651-522-1

=== Collections ===
- Iron Mosaic. Stafford: Immanion Press, 2004. ISBN 1-904853-03-X
