= Urania Award =

Italian science fiction award

The Urania Award (Italian: Premio Urania) is an annual literary competition run by the Italian magazine Urania for contemporary Italian science fiction novels. It was held for the first time in 1989.

== List of winners ==
Year	Winner	Title	Publication
1989	Vittorio Catani	Gli universi di Moras	Urania #1120
1990	Virginio Marafante	Luna di fuoco	Urania #1160
1991	Francesco Grasso	Ai due lati del muro	Urania #1189
1992	Nicoletta Vallorani	Il cuore finto di DR	Urania #1215
1993	Valerio Evangelisti	Nicholas Eymerich, Inquisitore	Urania #1241
1994	Massimo Pietroselli	Miraggi di silicio	Urania #1267
1995	Luca Masali	I biplani di D'Annunzio	Urania #1296
1997	Massimo Mongai	Memorie di un cuoco d'astronave	Urania #1320
1998	Franco Ricciardiello	Ai margini del caos	Urania #1348
1999	Claudio Asciuti	La Notte dei Pitagorici	Urania #1375
2000	Francesco Grasso	Masaniello è tornato, published as 2038: La rivolta	Urania #1403
2001	Donato Altomare	Mater Maxima	Urania #1426
2002	Lanfranco Fabriani	Lungo i vicoli del tempo	Urania #1453
2003	Alberto Costantini	I sentieri di Ucronia, published as Terre accanto	Urania #1478
2004	Paolo Aresi	La scala infinita, published as Oltre il pianeta del vento	Urania #1492
2005	Lanfranco Fabriani	Nelle nebbie del tempo	Urania #1504
2006	Alberto Costantini	More cadentis stellae, published as Stella cadente	Urania #1516
2007	Giovanni De Matteo	Post Mortem, published as Sezione π²	Urania #1528
2008	Donato Altomare	Il dono di Svet	Urania #1540
2009	Francesco Verso	Il fabbricante di sorrisi, published as E-doll	Urania #1552
2010	Alberto Cola	Lazarus	Urania #1565
2011	Maico Morellini	Il Re Nero	Urania #1576
2012	Alessandro Forlani	I senza-tempo	Urania #1588
2013	Piero Schiavo Campo	L'uomo a un grado Kelvin	Urania #1600
2014	Glauco De Bona	Cuori strappati	Urania #1612
2015	Sandro Battisti & Francesco Verso	il sangue e l'impero	Urania #1624
2016	Lukha B. Kremo	Pulphagus®	Urania #1636

- Premio Omelas
