= Duncan Lunan =

Scottish writer

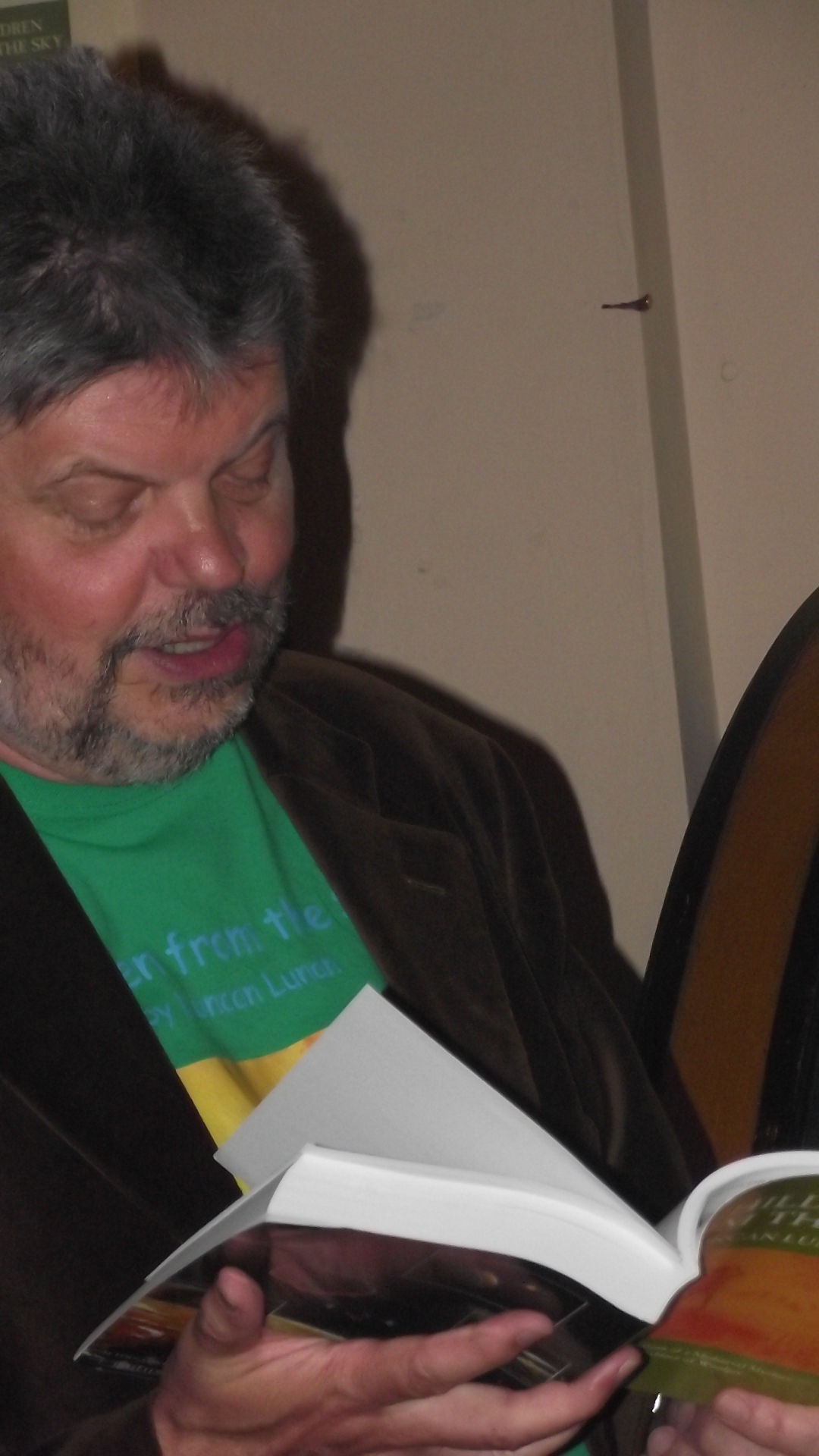
- Lunan in 2012
- Born: October 1945 (age 80–81)
- Education: University of Glasgow
- Occupations: Science and science fiction writer, astronomer, journalist

Duncan Alasdair Lunan, born October 1945, is a Scottish author with emphasis on astronomy, spaceflight and science fiction, undertaking a wide range of writing and speaking on those and other topics as a researcher, tutor, critic, editor, lecturer and broadcaster. He is known for his science writings as well as for his work on the Sighthill stone circle.

His 1970s report of a possible space probe orbiting around the Moon sent by the inhabitants of a planet orbiting Epsilon Boötis brought him to international notice.

== Background ==
Lunan, who grew up in Troon, claims descent from an illegitimate son of King Robert II of Scotland, Alexander Stuart, who owned the "Lands of Lunaine" near Aberdeen, and, more distantly, from the astronomers of ancient Chaldea "who invented the calendar, hence making agriculture and civilisation possible". On his mother's side, he claims to trace his ancestry back to the Mitochondrial Eve. In June 1959 he traveled to South Uist in the Hebrides to witness the test launch of an American MGM-5 Corporal, which the British Army had purchased as the nation's first nuclear missile. The 13-year-old student watched the launch with senior NATO military leaders, but at home he was interrogated by the Scottish Office, MI5, Army Intelligence, and the CIA to attempt to determine how he had entered the secret launch site, which the Soviets had put under surveillance.

Lunan was a founder of ASTRA. He is a 1968 bachelor's degree alumnus of the University of Glasgow, is an M.A. with honours in English and philosophy and has a postgraduate Diploma in Education. He was the manager of the Glasgow Parks Department's Astronomy Project responsible for building the Sighthill stone circle, the first astronomically aligned megalith built in Britain in 3,000 years.

Lunan was also a founder and is still a member of the Glasgow Science Fiction Writers' Circle.

He has also served with committee activities on the Argyle Local Housing Association, which is linked to the GHA, including serving as chairman from 2002 to 2006.

Despite his 1970s report of a possible space probe of extraterrestrial origins orbiting around the Moon, he insists that he "doesn't believe in UFOs".

His interests include "ancient and mediaeval history, jazz, folk music and hillwalking".

== Alien message ==
In a 1973 article in Spaceflight, a magazine published by the British Interplanetary Society (BIS), he said he had identified and deciphered a hidden radio message sent by an alien space probe that had been caught but overlooked in the late 1920s by a collaboration of Norwegian and Dutch researchers who were studying the long delayed echo effect. Published along with an accompanying editorial disclaimer, Lunan maintained that the putative message came from an object at the L_{5} point in the same orbit as the Moon, sent by the aliens living on a planet orbiting Epsilon Boötis.

He came to the conclusion that the message was, "Start here. Our home is Upsilon Bootes, which is a double star. We live on the sixth planet of seven, coming from the sun, which is the larger of the two. Our sixth planet has one moon. Our fourth planet has three. Our first and third planets each have one. Our probe is in the position of Arcturus, known in our maps."

The claim was reported in Time and the CBS Evening News. It was included in Rod Serling's 1975 TV documentary In Search of Ancient Mysteries and, many years later, on George Noory's Coast to Coast AM radio show. The alleged message has been refuted and in 1976 Lunan withdrew the theory, presenting proofs against it and clarifying what had led him to formulate it. However, in 1998 he re-interpreted part of it, claiming support from positional astronomy.

The theory was part of the inspiration of Mark Brandis' 1974 novel Raumsonde Epsilon (in English Spaceprobe Epsilon).

== Professional associations ==
=== Astronomy ===
He joined the Scottish branch of the BIS (British Interplanetary Society) in 1962. He was on the committee which drew up the constitution of ASTRA (Association in Scotland to Research into Astronautics) as an independent society in 1963, and redrafted it as the "Memorandum and Articles of a Company Limited by Guarantee" in 1974. He has been a council member since December 1963 with only two short breaks, and has been treasurer, president, vice-president, treasurer, president, secretary, president, treasurer and secretary again during that time. He was re-elected vice president in May 2010. He has been exhibition organiser and on the publications committee since 1970, editing ASTRA's publications in 1982 and between 1992 and 1996. Among many ASTRA conferences he organised one on archaeoastronomy at the Third Eye Centre in 1978 and "Heresies in Archaeoastronomy" at the Edinburgh International Science Festival in 1996.

Lunan and ASTRA have been at the forefront of the proposal of using a waverider for re-entry of spacecraft in the Earth's atmosphere.

In 1978 and 1979 he was manager of the Glasgow Parks Department's Astronomy Project.

He was acting curator of Airdrie Public Observatory in 1979 and 1980 and was assistant curator between 1987 and 1997, becoming a curator again in 2002 and continuing to 2008. ASTRA ceased to run the observatory for North Lanarkshire District Council in May 2009, ceding the running of the observatory to the Airdrie Astronomical Association (A.A.A). In 2006 and 2007 Lunan ran astronomy education projects funded by the National Lottery's Awards for All, with outreach to schools and community groups, followed by a larger project funded by Heritage Lottery for 2007 and 2008. His monthly astronomy column "The Sky above You" has appeared in various newspapers and magazines.

He resigned from ASTRA in 2011.

He is also an honorary member of the Clydesdale Astronomical Society.

He has been a director of the Space Settlers' Society, a space-politics society founded by Andy Nimmo in 1980.

Along with his wife Linda, Duncan Lunan is running the Astronomers of the Future club for beginners who are keen to find out more about astronomy and space, for which he holds regular talks.

Duncan and Linda Lunan are in discussions about the possibility of helping create a public observatory on the Falkland Islands, with support from the British Antarctic Survey.

=== Teaching and tutoring ===
In 1986, he contributed to the launch of the Glasgow Science Fiction Writers Circle by agreeing to run the first of six science fiction and fantasy short story competitions for the Glasgow Herald and to teach the first of six science fiction writing classes at the Glasgow University's Extra-Mural Department, later the Department of Adult and Continuing Education. He is still an active member of the Circle and took part to its spin-off spoken word project Word Dogs.

== Sighthill stone circle ==
As Manager of the Glasgow Parks Department's Astronomy Project in 1978–79, Duncan Lunan supervised the building of the first astronomically aligned stone circle in Britain in 3,000 years in Sighthill Park.

The conceptual inspiration for the circle came from Lunan's interest in the works of Professor Alexander Thom and his son Dr. Archie Thom, who promoted the understanding of megalithic astronomy, and the subsequent expansion of their work by Dr. Ewan McKie and Professor Archie Roy. The location of the stone circle, on a low hilltop between tower blocks, the M8 motorway and an incinerator, at a first sight seems hardly ideal. However, Lunan has written that the clear sightline to the sky and a fine view of the city centre met the project's objectives. Lunan has written that "In later research, I found that summer solstice fairs had been held on the Summerhill, from which the midsummer Sun rises over the true Sighthill, until they were stopped by the church in the 17th century".

Once he had identified the best location, Lunan organised the transportation of the stones by a helicopter from HMS Gannet. The Moon Stones, being too heavy, had to be transported by specially adapted lorries.

The project was not completed due to criticism by the incoming Thatcher government in 1979, and four stones – two of which were intended to mark equinoctial sunrise and sunset, east and west – are still lying under a bush in Sighthill park. Lunan is at present campaigning to have the circle renovated and completed, including plans for wheelchair access. The first initiative undertaken to draw attention to the megalith was a summer solstice gathering organised at the site on the evening of 21 June 2010 preceded by a presentation on the circle given by Lunan. Lunan reported "positive discussions with Heritage Lottery chiefs in relation to funding for the project, estimated at around 30,000 GBP".

Lunan presented plans to make the stone circle a key feature of a citywide astronomy map, including the entire Solar System represented on the correct scale within the city limits as first proposed by Gavin Roberts, who was the arts and photographic supervisor on the original Project. If the stone circle represented the Sun, Lunan said, Saturn would be by the River Clyde near the Glasgow Science Centre, Jupiter in the campus of the University of Strathclyde, Uranus on Maryhill Road and Neptune and the dwarf planet Pluto at Cathkin Braes, south of Castlemilk.

The history of the stone circle was featured in the BBC Radio Scotland show Out of Doors in January 2011.

In 2011, Duncan Lunan and his wife Linda founded the Friends of the Sighthill Stone Circle association.

== Publications ==
His non-fiction books include Man and the Stars (published in the United States with the titles Interstellar Contact and The Mysterious Signals from Outer Space and translated into French by Jean Sendy as À l'écoute des galaxies and into Spanish by David Molinet as A la escucha de las estrellas), New Worlds for Old, Man and the Planets and Children from the Sky.

He was a science fiction critic for the Glasgow Herald between 1971 and 1985, and ran the paper's science fiction and fantasy short story competitions between 1986 and 2002, edited Starfield, Science Fiction by Scottish Writers for Orkney Press in 1989, to which he also contributed with a short story, "The Square Fella". He also contributed two stories, "'Tirra Lirra' by the River, Sang Sir Lancelot" and "Landscape Modification in the Vicinity of Highgate Cemetery", to the 1988 Drabble Project of the Science Fiction society of the University of Birmingham and published by Beccon. He also contributed reviews to Interzone.

He lists amongst his inspirations Percy F. Westerman, Arthur Ransome, Nicholas Monsarrat, Arthur C. Clarke, Patrick Moore, G. K. Chesterton and C. S. Lewis.

A short story, "The Comet, the Cairn and the Capsule", was included in the 1979 short story collection The Science Fictional Solar System edited by Isaac Asimov, Charles G. Waugh and Martin H. Greenberg.

Some filk songs he wrote have been published in an anthology.

== Green children of Woolpit ==
In a 1996 Analog Science Fiction and Fact article, Lunan speculated that the Green children of Woolpit were mistakenly transported to Earth due to malfunction in a matter transmitter. He also claimed that he can trace the Green Girl's descendants to the present.

Taking a lead from Robert Burton's The Anatomy of Melancholy, he suggests that the children were accidentally returned from a settlement of humans established by extraterrestrials on an earthlike world with a trapped synchronous orbit rotation with unusual genetically modified vegetation, which would allegedly explain their unusual skin colour.

He presented his theory on 9 November 2011 episode of Ground Zero Live conducted by Clyde Lewis.

In 2012 Lunan published Children from the Sky, a study of the green children and the documentation related to them, illustrated by Sydney Jordan.
