= Association in Scotland to Research into Astronautics =

Association in Scotland To Research into Astronautics
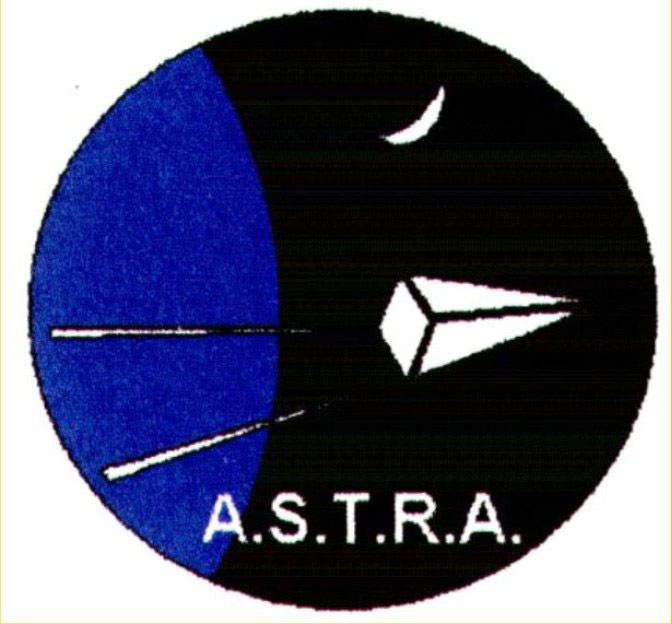
- Founded: 1963
- Founder: Oscar Schwiglhofer
- Type: Charitable organisation
- Purpose: Space and Science Education
- Location: Ogilvie Center, Glasgow
- Website: astraglasgow.com

The Association in Scotland To Research into Astronautics (ASTRA), is a membership-based society that concerns itself with all matters related to space research. Its current center of operations is in the Scottish city of Glasgow and it is affiliated to a number of other bodies, including the Federation of Astronomical Societies and the Glasgow Council for the Voluntary Sector.

Through a process that was undertaken in 1976, ASTRA is now registered as a charitable company, with limit by guarantee (registration number SC005527), and it was at that time that Companies House forced the society to change its name.

ASTRA holds meetings, events, and guest lectures at its Glasgow base at the Ogilvie Center, and also involves itself with events in other parts of the country. The society's members meet bi-monthly and meetings are held on the first and third Monday.

ASTRA's aim, as stated in Article 3, of their Memorandum of Association is "to promote the advancement of knowledge and the spread of education and particularly the dissemination of knowledge on space activities and all branches of science pertaining to such activities, and to stimulate public interest therein". This aim is distilled on the official ASTRA website, where the society states, on its "About ASTRA" page, that it has two objectives:

1. To further develop the public's interest in every aspect of space and space research.
2. To undertake research, provided that it is practical and possible.

In 2006 the UK National Lottery agreed to sponsor an ASTRA outreach project that sought to engage schools, or any public body, for 3 months on the subject of astronomy, at no cost to the recipient. ASTRA utilized the Scottish curriculum as a framework for the educational project and focused on the concept of "Earth & Space". The project was accessed by a large number of primary schools in North Lanarkshire and The National Lottery re-funded the initiative the following year in 2007.

== Waverider ==
The Waverider re-entry vehicle, based on the Blue Streak missile, was devised by Professor Terence Nonweiler of Queen's University Belfast, and was intended to be the crewed spacecraft in the British space programme. The programme was cancelled by the Macmillan government, but the work on Waverider continued at the Royal Aircraft Establishment, Farnborough — mainly to establish Waverider's potential as a Mach 6 airliner. During this period (1960–1965) at least one Waverider was tested at the Woomera Test Range. There were rumours that free-flight tests were also conducted at this time. Tests of X and Y-winged projectiles (in effect, three or four Waveriders mounted back-to-back) related to the Waverider were performed at NASA's Ames Research Center.

Professor Nonweiler became a member of ASTRA just after he became Professor of Aerodynamics and Fluid Mechanics at Glasgow University, and retained his membership after ASTRA's independence. He moved to New Zealand in July 1975 to become a professor of Applied Mathematics at the University of Wellington. At the ASTRA AGM in 1974, Professor Nonweiler was nominated for Honorary Membership by Ian Downie, which he accepted from New Zealand.

When Duncan Lunan spoke about 'Man and the Planets' at the 'View from Earth' symposium in California in 1984, it attracted the attention of the Jet Propulsion Laboratory, located in Pasadena, California. Dr. Jim Randolph attended the first ever rocket launch (to free flight) of a Waverider at Brisbane Glen outside Largs, in September 1985, shortly after ASTRA member Gordon Ross solved the problem of subsonic flight stability.

In May 1988, Professor Nonweiler came to Glasgow for a two-day conference with Jim Randolph. By that time Waverider was a serious contender to be the carrier vehicle for the NASA/JPL Parker Solar Probe mission to send an uncrewed vehicle to within four solar radii (2.782 million kilometers) of the surface of the Sun. In theory, the mission could be accomplished by a Jupiter slingshot, but the radiation hazards and the very long flight time made such a method impractical. Aerogravity manoeuvres in the atmospheres of the inner planets could put the probe into a trajectory providing solar encounters every two to three months, but would require a carrier with a very high lift-to-drag ratio at high Mach numbers — for which Waverider seemed the best candidate, as Jim Randolph confirmed on his third visit to Scotland in April 1990.

In 1989, Gordon Ross completed a radio-controlled flying model (another first for ASTRA), test-flown by Richard Newlands until it was damaged in a hard landing. It was rebuilt as an exhibition model, and it and the other surviving models from the 1980s are now in the care of Glasgow's Museum of Transport.

== History ==
ASTRA traces its roots back to 1953 when Oscar Schwiglhofer, a member of the British Interplanetary Society (BIS) (and a former student of Hermann Oberth, ASTRA's first honorary member), started a Scottish branch of the BIS with great success. This success was met with resistance from BIS London.

The society adopted its constitution on 20 November 1963, and was originally known as the Association in Scotland for Technology and Research in Astronautics. It was at this point in time that the society formally became ASTRA, due to continued differences between itself and the BIS in London, although there is currently little animosity.

In the 1970s, ASTRA held discussions concerning how best to use the resources within the Solar System, for example, by mining asteroids. From these discussions, three books were written by Duncan Lunan, part of their sales proceeds going to ASTRA. In order to receive the sales proceeds, ASTRA became a registered charity, which, in the past, required ASTRA to become a company. Although these books are now out of print, they were translated into many languages and sold many copies.

In 1976, ASTRA registered as a charitable company limited by guarantee.

In 1977, the Waverider shape was incorporated into a new ASTRA logo.

In 1978, ASTRA saved Airdrie Public Observatory, atop Airdrie Public Library, from being demolished – the previous curators had not taken great care of the observatory and it had suffered damage in a storm. ASTRA offered to repair the telescope and drive if the Monklands District Council would repair the dome. This was done and ASTRA continued to run the observatory, on behalf of North Lanarkshire Council, until 2008.

In 2003, the 25th anniversary of ASTRA managing Airdrie Public Observatory was celebrated, along with the 50th anniversary of the founding of the Society.

In 2008, ASTRA stopped managing Airdrie Public Observatory, after the ASTRA Airdrie branch agreed to dissolve its membership of ASTRA, upon which a new group, the Airdrie Astronomical Association began running the Observatory at the invitation of the North Lanarkshire council (now CultureNL).

In 2008/2009, the Airdrie Astronomical Association (AAA) was formed after the ASTRA Airdrie branch agreed to dissolve its membership of ASTRA and the new local group began running the Observatory at the invitation of the North Lanarkshire council.

== See also ==
- List of astronomical societies
