= Cameron Johnston (writer) =

Scottish science fiction writer

- Citizenship: United Kingdom
- Education: Strathclyde University
- Occupations: Science fiction and fantasy writer
- Website: www.cameronjohnston.net

Cameron Johnston is a Scottish author.

He attended the University of Strathclyde. As of 2026, he lived in Glasgow, and is a member of the Glasgow Science Fiction Writers' Circle.

== Writing ==
Johnston's first novel, The Traitor God (2018), is a grimdark epic fantasy published with Angry Robot. The novel was nominated for the 2019 British Fantasy Award for Best Newcomer, as well as the Dragon Award for Best Fantasy Novel. It was followed by a sequel, God of Broken Things (2019).

Following the duology, Johnston has published three additional novels: The Maleficent Seven (2021), The Last Shield (2024), and First Mage On The Moon (2026). The Maleficent Seven (2021) is a standalone novel described as fantasy take on The Seven Samurai about an aged demonologist reuniting with her villainous captains to defend a town against a crusading army of light. The San Francisco Book Review described it as "brutal, bloody, and laugh-out-loud funny". The Last Shield (2024) is a standalone novel about a wounded guard captain protecting a palace against invaders. It deals with themes of injury, recovery, and vengeance, and has been described as a fantasy version of Die Hard. The novel was nominated for the 2025 Dragon Award for Best Fantasy Novel. Lastly, First Mage On The Moon (2026) is a standalone novel about a group of rogue wizards building a magical rocketship to go to the moon. The book takes inspiration from the USA/USSR space race. SF Book Reviews's Sam Tyler described the novel as a genre-blending mix of fantasy and science fiction.

In addition to Johnston's novels, his short fiction has been broadcast by BBC Radio Scotland on The Arts Mix.

Johnston has listed David Gemmell, HP Lovecraft and Robert E. Howard as major literary influences on his writing. He has also stated that he gains much of his inspiration from his fascination with archaeology and history, and castles, stone circles, old bridges, churches and ancient places for providing much of his writing inspiration.

== Bibliography ==
=== Novels ===
==== The Age of Tyranny duology ====
- The Traitor God. Angry Robot books, 2018. ISBN 978-0857667809
- God of Broken Things. Angry Robot books, 2019. ISBN 978-0857668103

==== Other Novels ====
- The Maleficent Seven. Angry Robot books, 2021. ISBN 978-0857669094
- The Last Shield. Angry Robot books, 2024. ISBN 978-1915998040
- First Mage On The Moon. Angry Robot books, 2026. ISBN 978-1915998071

=== Novelettes ===
- Faith in Iron. Black Library, 2020. ISBN 978-1789993400

=== Anthologies ===
- Gods of The Deepwood, in GALLUS: A Glasgow SF Writers' Circle anthology. Independently published, 2024. ISBN 979-8328059664
- Editor of Thirty Years of Rain. Independently published, 2016. ISBN 978-1326753429

=== Short Fiction ===
- Birth Of A Demonologist. Grimdark Magazine #37, 2024.
- Head Games. Grimdark Magazine #21, 2022.
- Hatred for Heroes. Grimdark Magazine #18, 2019.
- Surviving Life. Kzine Issue #23, 2019.
- The Dying Glass. Deep Magic, Fall 2018. Finalist in the James White Award 2017.
- The Blitz of Din Barham. Heroic Fantasy Quarterly, issue 37, 2018.
- The Sleekit Ones. The Lovecraft eZine #34, 2015
- The Shadow Under Scotland. The Lovecraft eZine #31, 2014
