= Valerio Evangelisti =

Italian writer (1952–2022)

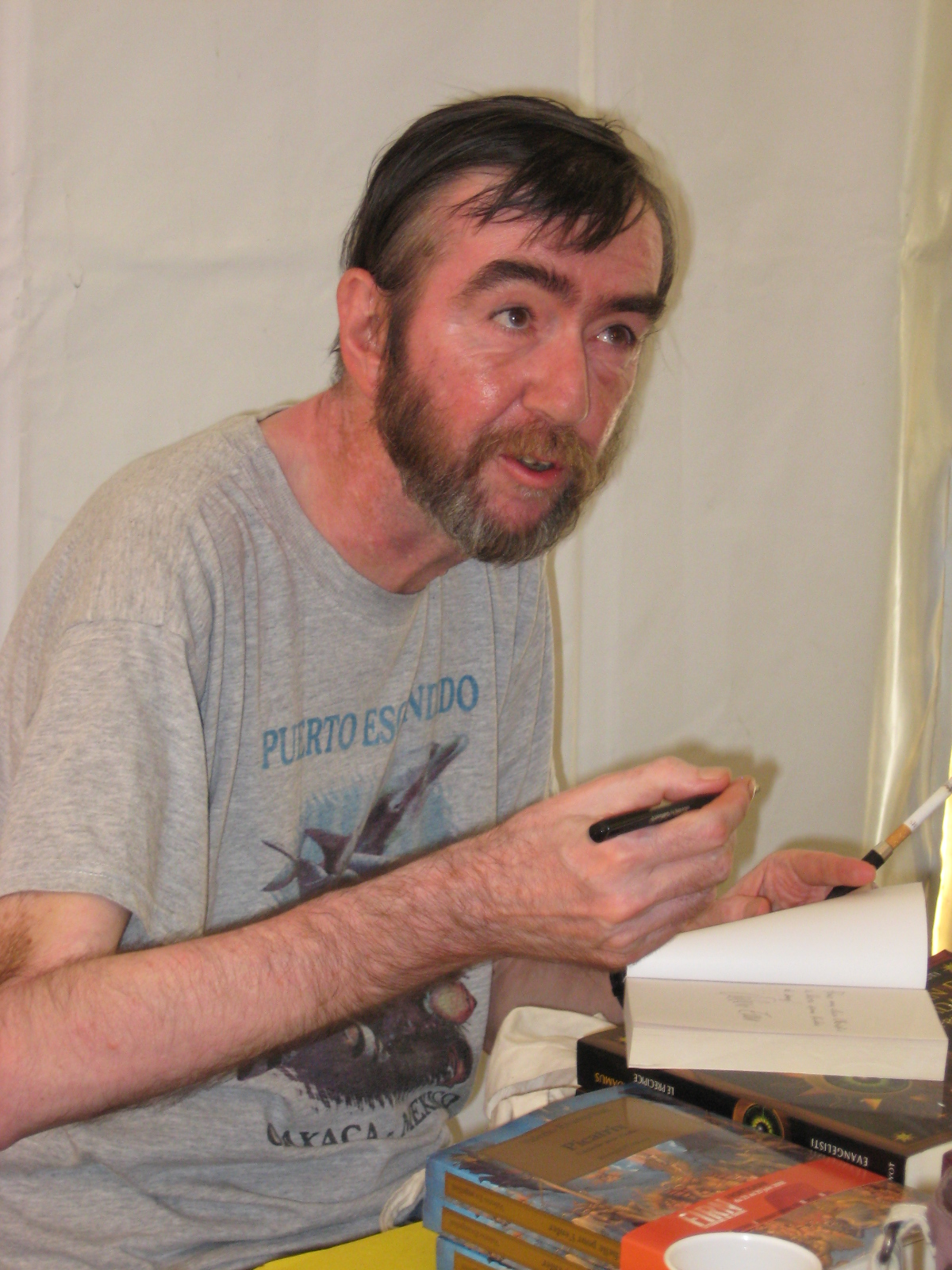
- Evangelisti at the Festival international du roman noir in 2008
- Born: June 20, 1952; Bologna, Italy
- Died: April 18, 2022 (aged 69); Bologna, Italy
- Education: Political Science
- Occupation: Novelist
- Writing career
- Period: 1993–2022
- Genres: science fiction, fantasy, historical novels and horror
- Notable work: Series of novels featuring Nicolas Eymerich
- Notable awards: Urania Award (1993)
- Website: www.eymerich.com

Valerio Evangelisti (20 June 1952 – 18 April 2022) was an Italian writer of science fiction, fantasy, historical novels, and horror. He is known mainly for his series of novels featuring the inquisitor Nicolas Eymerich and for the Nostradamus trilogy, all bestsellers translated into many languages. Some of his books are seen as part of the body of literary works known as the New Italian Epic.

== Biography ==
Evangelisti earned his degree in Political Science in 1976 with a historical-political thesis. He was born in Bologna, where he lived; he spent some time each year in Puerto Escondido, Oaxaca, Mexico, where he owned a house.

Until 1990 his career was mainly academic. He also worked for the Italian Ministero delle Finanze (Treasury Department). His first written works were historical essays, including five books and some forty articles. In 1993 his novel Nicolas Eymerich, inquisitore won the Urania Award, which was established by Urania, Italy’s main science fiction magazine, with the aim of discovering new talent in the field. Urania published other novels of the series in the following years: Le catene di Eymerich ("Eymerich’s Chains", 1995), Il corpo e il sangue di Eymerich ("Eymerich’s Body and Blood", 1996), Il mistero dell'inquisitore Eymerich ("Eymerich’s Mystery", 1996), Cherudek (1997), Picatrix, la scala per l'inferno ("Picatrix, the Stairway to Hell", 1998), Il castello di Eymerich ("Eymerich’s Castle", 2001), Mater terribilis (2002). Most of the last ones were however first published as hardcover.

Nicolas Eymerich is a real historical character, member of the order of the Dominicans and inquisitor in the Spanish Inquisition. He was born in 1320 in Girona, Catalonia, and died in 1399. Evangelisti’s interpretation of his character is a cruel, ruthless, haughty, restless man, who acts mercilessly to protect the Catholic Church against perceived menaces of natural or supernatural origin. At the same time he shows an outstanding intelligence and a deep culture in his actions. In the novels of the series he investigates the mysterious phenomena of Medieval Europe, thus subtly influencing many of the historical events of that epoch; on many occasions the solution of the riddles comes up from stories which are narrated along with the main plot, normally set in the present and in the future. Evangelisti's atmospheres are normally dark, nightmarish, haunting.

Another success of 1999, also translated in several languages, is the Magus trilogy, a romanticized biography of the famous Middle Ages prophecies writer Nostradamus. The three novels, Il presagio ("The Omen"), L’inganno ("The Deceit") and L'abisso ("The Abyss") sold 100,000 copies in Italy.

Evangelisti's novels are greatly appreciated in France (where he won several literary awards), Spain, Germany and Portugal. He was the director of the Carmilla magazine. In the last years he has written some works which show his love for heavy metal music, namely the short stories collection Metallo urlante (referring to the French magazine Metal Hurlant) and the novels Black Flag and Antracite: they are set during the American Civil War and feature a new character, Pantera, a palero shaman. One of his latest novels, Noi saremo tutto ("We Shall Be All"), spans several decades of the last century, exploring the life of Eddie Florio, a gangster, against the background of the history of the trade unions and the workers' battles for civil rights.

Mexico is the setting for his next two novels, Il collare di fuoco ("The Fire Collar"), which was published in November 2005 and Il collare spezzato ("The Broken Collar", October 2006). In 2007 La luce di Orione was released, the ninth title in the Eymerich series, followed in 2010 by Rex tremendae maiestatis.

Tortuga, a novel about pirates of the Caribbean, was published in 2008.

Evangelisti died on 18 April 2022, at the age of 69.

== Main works ==
=== Historical essays ===
- Storia del partito socialista rivoluzionario 1881-1893 (1981), Cappelli, Bologna
- Il galletto rosso, precariato e conflitto di classe in Emilia Romagna 1880-1890 with Salvatore Sechi, (1982), Marsilio, Venezia
- Sinistre eretiche, dalla banda Bonnot al Sandinismo, 1905-1984 (1985), SugarCo, Milano
- Gallerie nel presente. Punk, Snuffs, Contras: tre studi di storia simultanea (1988), Lacaita, Bari
- Gli sbirri alla lanterna: la plebe giacobina bolognese dall'anno I all'anno V (1792-1797) (1991), Bold Machine, Bologna

=== Eymerich series ===
- Nicolas Eymerich inquisitore (1994)
- Le catene di Eymerich (1995)
- Il corpo e il sangue di Eymerich (1996)
- Il mistero dell'inquisitore Eymerich (1996)
- Cherudek (1997)
- Picatrix, la scala per l'inferno (1998)
- Il castello di Eymerich (2001)
- Mater Terribilis (2002)
- La luce di Orione (2007)
- Rex tremendae maiestatis (2010)
- Eymerich risorge (2017)
- Il fantasma di Eymerich (2018)

=== Metal Hurlant series ===
- Metallo urlante (1998)
- Black Flag (2002)
- Antracite (2003)

=== Nostradamus Trilogy ===
- Magus: Il Presagio (1999)
- Magus. L'Inganno (1999)
- Magus: L'Abisso (1999)
- Magus: Il Romanzo di Nostradamus (2000)

=== Pirates Cycle ===
- Tortuga (2008)
- Veracruz (2009)
- Cartagena (2012)

=== Other novels ===
- Gocce nere (2001)
- Noi saremo tutto (2004)
- Il collare di fuoco (2005)
- Il collare spezzato (2006)
- One Big Union (2011)
- Il sole dell'avvenire (2013)

=== Comics ===
- La furia di Eymerich, (2003 – art by Francesco Mattioli)
- Nicolas Eymerich inquisitore (2003 – art by David Sala)

=== With Others ===
- Lune nere (2005), with Paolo Ferrucci.
- Controinsurrezioni (2008), with Antonio Moresco.

== Sources ==
- Chianese, A. L’anima dell’inquisitore. L’opera di Valerio Evangelisti. Trento: UNI Service, 2004
- Rossi, Umberto. "Valerio Evangelisti: The Italian Way to Slipstream". Science-Fiction Studies #120, 40:2 (2013), 335-363.
- Somigli, Luca. Valerio Evangelisti. Fiesole: Cadmo, 2007.
- Vial, Eric. "Bûchers d'autrefois et guerres à venir: Valerio Evangelisti et l'inquisiteur Nicola Eymerich entre littérature populaire et discours engagé". Cahiers d'études italiennes: Novecento.. e dintorni. N° 3/2005, 125-38.

== Footnotes ==
Preceded by Ken MacLeod	ESFS award for Best Author; 2002	Succeeded by Sergey Lukyanenko
