= Vittorio Catani =

Italian writer (1940–2020)

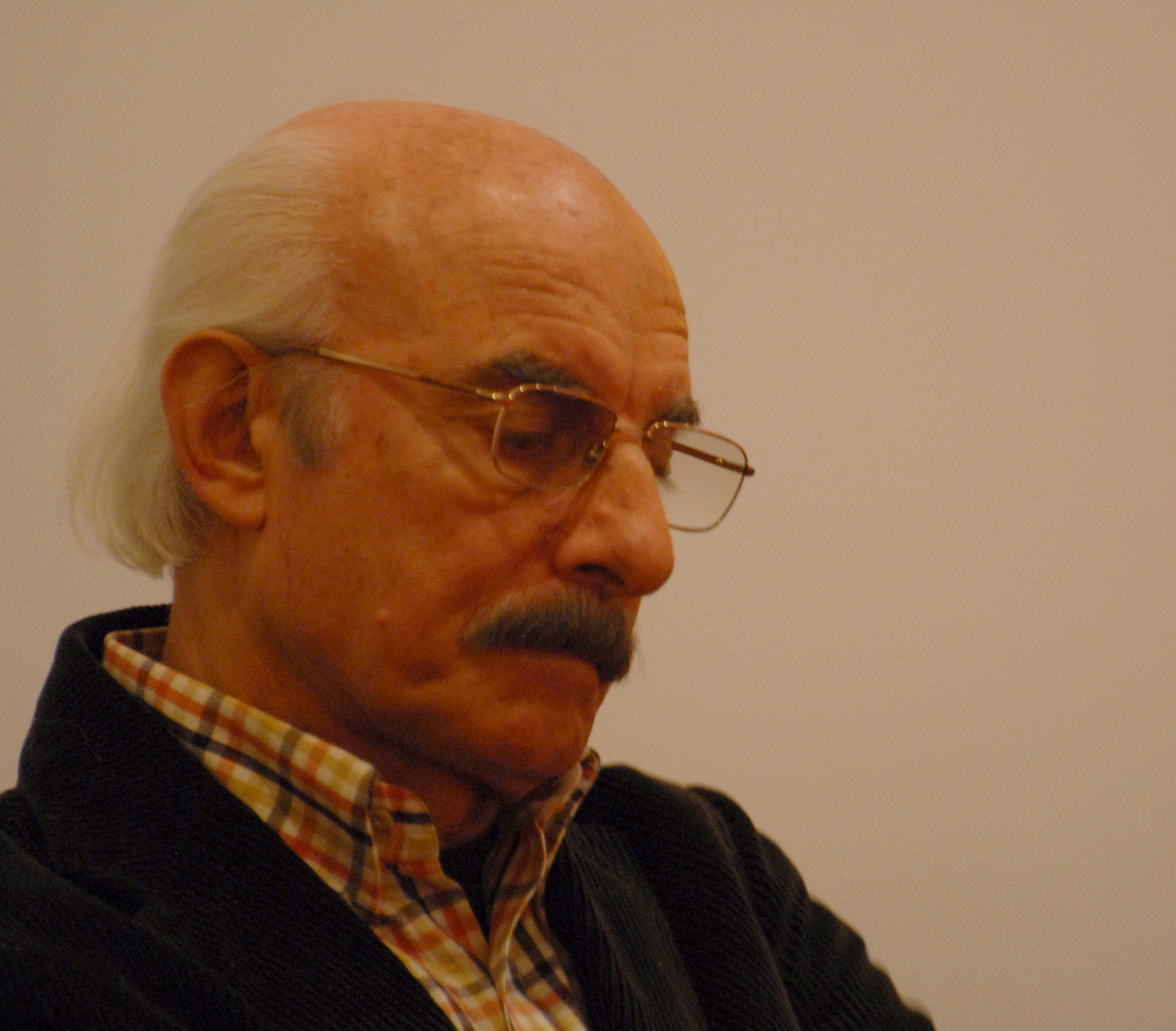
Vittorio Catani during the 2010 convention Deepcon 11 / Italcon 36

Vittorio Catani (17 July 1940 – 23 November 2020) was an Italian science fiction writer.

== Career ==
Born in Lecce, he lived and worked in Bari, Italy. Formerly a bank clerk, he started publishing essays and fiction in 1962, especially within the fantasy and science fiction genres. His first novel, Gli universi di Moras, won the Premio Urania in 1990.

He has been published in most major newspapers and magazines, and his works have been translated in a number of European countries. He contributed to the daily newspaper La Gazzetta del Mezzogiorno, the environmental quarterly "Villaggio Globale", and was one of the editors of "www.fantascienza.com" and "www.carmillaonline.com".

His second science fiction novel, Il Quinto Principio, was published in December 2009, again by Urania.

Catani died in Bari on 23 November 2020, at the age of 80.

== Works ==
- L'eternità e i mostri (1972, short stories collection)
- Il gioco dei mondi (1985, essay on science fiction)
- Gli universi di Moras (1990, novel, winner of Premio Urania)
- I guastatori dell'Eden (1993, novel)
- Replay di un amore (1994, novel)
- Cronache dal futuro (1995, a boy's guide to Italian fantasy fiction)
- Tra cielo e Terra (1998, short stories collection)
- Accadde... domani (2001, short stories and vignettes collection)
- Storie dal villaggio globale. 21 racconti tra ecologia e fantascienza (2004, short environmental stories collection)
- Vengo solo se parlate di Ufi (2004, essays on science fiction)
- L'essenza del futuro (2007, 63 short stories and novelettes collection 1955/2007)
- Per dimenticare Alessia (2007, novel, not science fiction)
- Mi sono perso col cosmo tra le mani (2008, essays on science fiction)
- I suoni del silenzio (2009, 3 short stories collection)
- Il Quinto Principio (2009, novel)
