= Mercenary (board game) =

Board game published in 1975

Box cover of 1978 edition

Mercenary, subtitled "Merchant Princes Alter the Course of World Events", is a board game published by Fantasy Games Unlimited (FGU) in 1975 that is a game of conquest set in medieval Europe during the period 1494–1560. Critics complained that there were large gaps in the rules. As Jon Freeman noted, "the designer has made the standard mistake of assuming the gamers know what was in his mind."

== Description ==
Mercenary is a board game for 2–6 players, where each player represents a powerful merchant who is trying to control the destiny of a European power. Players can use diplomacy to form or break alliances, as well as bribery, terror or military conquest. They can even offer their grown children for politically-expedient marriages. As the game progresses, players can buy upgraded technology, such as arquebusiers in place of crossbowmen. The large 23" x 29" map (slightly smaller in the second edition) uses movement via area rather than a hex grid. The game lasts eleven turns (each representing six years), and the player with the most money at the end of the last turn is the winner. With 220 counters and many rules, the game has been characterized as "complex."

== Publication history ==
Mercenary was designed by Chris Ruffle, and was published by FGU in 1975 as a ziplock bag game with a paper map. Three years later, FGU republished Mercenary as a boxed set with a mounted but slightly smaller map.

In the UK, the game was published by Gametesters of Yorkshire.

== Reception ==
In The Guide to Simulations/Games for Education and Training, Martin Campion called the game "a great idea, but it has grave difficulties. The rules have to be described as suggestive rather than descriptive." Campion went on to suggest that the game might actually be better suited to classroom use rather than social play since "the instructor can impose new rules as the need for them arises, while social players must laboriously negotiate the rules as they go along."

In the 1980 book The Complete Book of Wargames, game designer Jon Freeman called Mercenary "an ambitious game. [...] There are a lot of interesting mechanics here." But he too had issues with rules that left too much undefined, commenting "The rules are hazy — and that hurts." Freeman concluded by giving the game an Overall Evaluation of only "Fair", saying, "For those particularly interested in this age or this genre, this could be a worthwhile purchase. Otherwise, try something else."

== Reviews ==
- Phoenix #4
