= Oscar Chichoni =

Argentine comics artist and illustrator

- Born: 14 July 1957 (age 69); Corral de Bustos, Argentina
- Known for: Illustration work, conceptual art, production designer
- Website: chichoni.com

Oscar Chichoni (born 14 July 1957) is an Argentine illustrator of comic books and science fiction magazines and books.

== Biography ==
Chichoni was born in a desolate hamlet in Corral de Bustos, province of Córdoba, and is self-taught in art. He published his first comic books pictures at the age of 17 for the Argentine publisher Record, and soon his work was paralleled to that of some famous authors like Alberto Breccia, Juan Zanotto and Juan Giménez.

Following this period as a comic book artist, Chichoni devoted himself to painting. He spent two times studying under the painter Álvaro Izurieta, and began to draw book covers for several publishers, becoming soon renowned in all the world for his powerful and well-detailed anatomies.

In the second half of the 1980s he moved to Europe, collaborating and winning various awards. His main collaboration is for the Italian editor Arnoldo Mondadori's science fiction series Urania and its spin-offs.

Since 1995, Chichoni has been working as free-lance, mainly as conceptual creator for films. He collaborated on the graphic part of the videogames Starship Titanic by Douglas Adams and Broken Sword 3. In 2000 he published Mekanika, his first collection of artworks.

Chichoni's best-known style combines mechanical intricacy and sensuality in a striking statement of Art Deco reborn. He is a man of many pencils, and is capable of countless other styles hard-edged, gothic, impressionist, almost anything that might fire the imagination.

Chichoni is currently living in London, where he works in team with the architect Isabel Molina.

== Awards ==
- In Argentina, Premio Mas Alla as best illustrator.
- In Spain, Premio 1984 as best cover artist and for the best cover.
- In Italy, Caran d'Ache at the Lucca Comics.

== Selected works ==
=== Covers ===
- Fierro (Argentina)
- Playboy (Argentine and Spanish edition)
- Totem (Spain)
- Minotauro (Argentina and Spain)
- Zona 84 (Spain)
- Urania (Italy)
- Classici Urania (Italy)
- Altri Mondi (Italy)
- L'Eternauta (Italy)
- Métal hurlant magazine (France)
- USA Magazine (France)
- Heavy Metal (USA)

=== Films ===
- Restoration (1995)
- Tell-Tale (2009)

=== Video games ===
- Starship Titanic (1998)
- Broken Sword 3: the Sleeping Dragon (2003)
- Necrocide: The Dead Must Die (cancelled)
