= Urania (magazine) =

Cover for a number of Urania, featuring Alan Dean Foster's The Mocking Program.

Urania is an Italian science fiction magazine published by Arnoldo Mondadori Editore since 10 October 1952.

== History ==
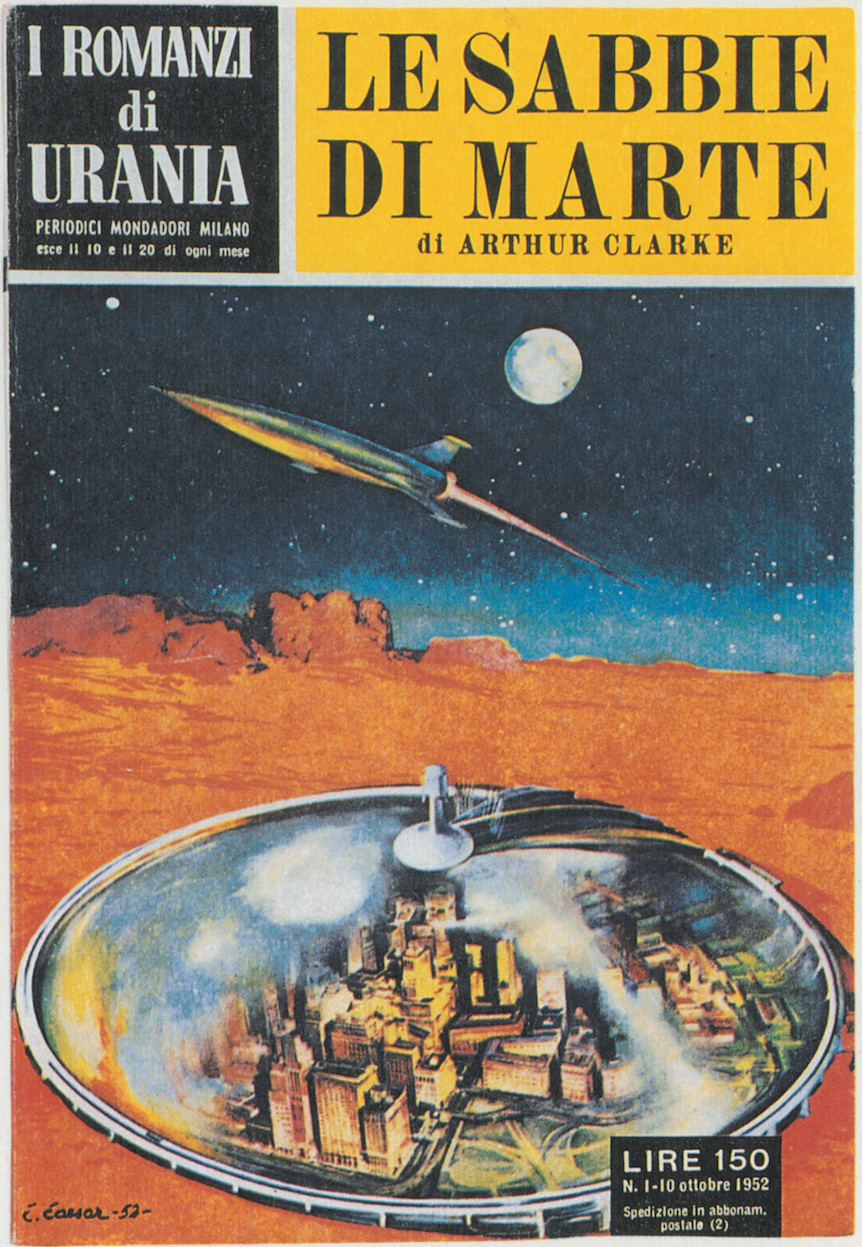
Cover of the first novel from the book series I Romanzi di Urania: The Sands of Mars by Arthur C. Clarke, 10 October 1952.

The first issue featured the novel The Sands of Mars by Arthur C. Clarke (as Le sabbie di Marte). The original name of the series was I Romanzi di Urania ("Urania's novels"), to differentiate it from another magazine with the same name (but popularly known as Urania Rivista, "Urania Magazine"), which featured only short stories. The latter, however, lasted only 14 issues, and Romanzi di Urania soon took the simpler name, which still holds today. Short story collections were thenceforth published in the main series, which at its height had a weekly periodicity with a circulation of 160,000 copies a month. Since the very beginning Urania has been indeed the best selling SF magazine of Italy, also introducing to Italian readers some famed authors like Isaac Asimov, Alfred Elton van Vogt, Robert A. Heinlein, J. G. Ballard, Philip K. Dick and many others. The first editor was Giorgio Monicelli (brother of movie director Mario Monicelli): Monicelli is credited with the invention of the word fantascienza, meaning science-fiction in Italian. From 1964 to 1985 novels and short stories were selected by the renowned Italian writers and intellectuals Carlo Fruttero and Franco Lucentini, who also appeared in the magazine with a few short stories written under pseudonyms. In 1985, Their successor was Gianni Montanari, who worked for the magazine until 1990.

Gianni Montanari promoted contemporary authors and, most importantly, eliminated reprints labeled "I Capolavori" Montanari introduced the Premio Urania, which allowed the publication of works by Italian authors again, after nearly 30 years of exclusively foreign authors.

From 1990 until his death in 2018, the series was edited by Giuseppe Lippi, who helped pursue changes to the editorial lines as well as fully republishing many of the incomplete volumes edited by Fruttero and Lucentini.

Most of the novels and short stories were from American and British authors (with some French novels in the 1950s). Italian authors appeared uncredited, only under pseudonyms. Starting from the late 1980s, Italian Science fiction writers are a more frequent presence. The competition of Premio Urania ("Urania Award") was launched in 1990, open to all previously unpublished Italian novels from famous or unknown authors. The winner is awarded with publication in the magazine. The first winner was Vittorio Catani with his Gli universi di Moras (Urania #1120). In 1994 Urania published the first novel by now-world-famed Valerio Evangelisti, who had won the Premio Urania for that year with Nicholas Eymerich, inquisitore. Other winners include Nicoletta Vallorani and Massimo Mongai.

== Cover artists ==
First covers were by Carlo Jacono and Kurt Caesar, but the "golden era" of the magazine was marked by the renowned Dutch painter Karel Thole, who introduced his unparalleled, bizarre medley of surrealism, horror, classical citations and sense of humour. Other outstanding cover artists who worked for Urania were Vicente Segrelles from Spain (1988–1991) and Oscar Chichoni from Argentina (1990s). Current cover artist is Franco Brambilla.

A cover by Karel Thole for Millemondi, a spin-off series of reprints or short stories collections.

A cover by Franco Brambilla for an issue of Urania Collezione, a reprint of Philip José Farmer's The Maker of Universes.

== Spin-offs ==
The magazine sprung a great deal of spin-off series, mostly short-lived and ceased today:

- Millemondi, which started in the 1970s with 3/4 monthly periodicity. Currently ongoing, it reprints famous novels by greatest SF authors which have been already published in the main series. Sometimes it houses previously unpublished collections of short stories.
- Urania Argento ("Silver Urania") was a monthly series started in 1995 with covers by Oscar Chichoni and more lengthy, previously unpublished novels: it lasted 14 numbers.
- Urania Blu of 1984 was intended to reprint major short-stories collections and other works (including a collection of articles about science fiction by Isaac Asimov), but had a run of only 4 numbers.
- Urania Biblioteca was another series of reprints with irregular periodicity.
- Classici Urania (now ceased) was a monthly reprint of the best novels and anthologies of the main series.
- Urania Fantasy was a monthly series dedicated to fantasy titles (1988–1995): it was canceled after 79 numbers. It has been resumed discontinuously in 2001–2006 (9 issues, with numbering starting again from 1). A new number 1 (featuring Robert E. Howard's stories about Kull) was published in April 2008.
- Urania Collezione started in 2003 and is still monthly outgoing: it is similar to Classici Urania but has revised translations (until 1980s novels were extensively abridged) and (in the first numbers) a different packaging.
- Epix (rechristened Urania Epix starting from issue no. 10), a monthly launched in 2009. It housed horror, fantasy and fantastic novels or anthologies, mainly by Italian authors. It ceased after 15 numbers.

For many years Urania included a comic strip section: main titles were B.C. by Johnny Hart, The Wizard of Id, by the same Hart and Brant Parker and Catfish by Bollen & Peterman.

== See also ==
- List of magazines in Italy
- Science fiction magazine
- Fantasy fiction magazine
- Horror fiction magazine
