= Franco Brambilla (illustrator) =

Italian science fiction illustrator

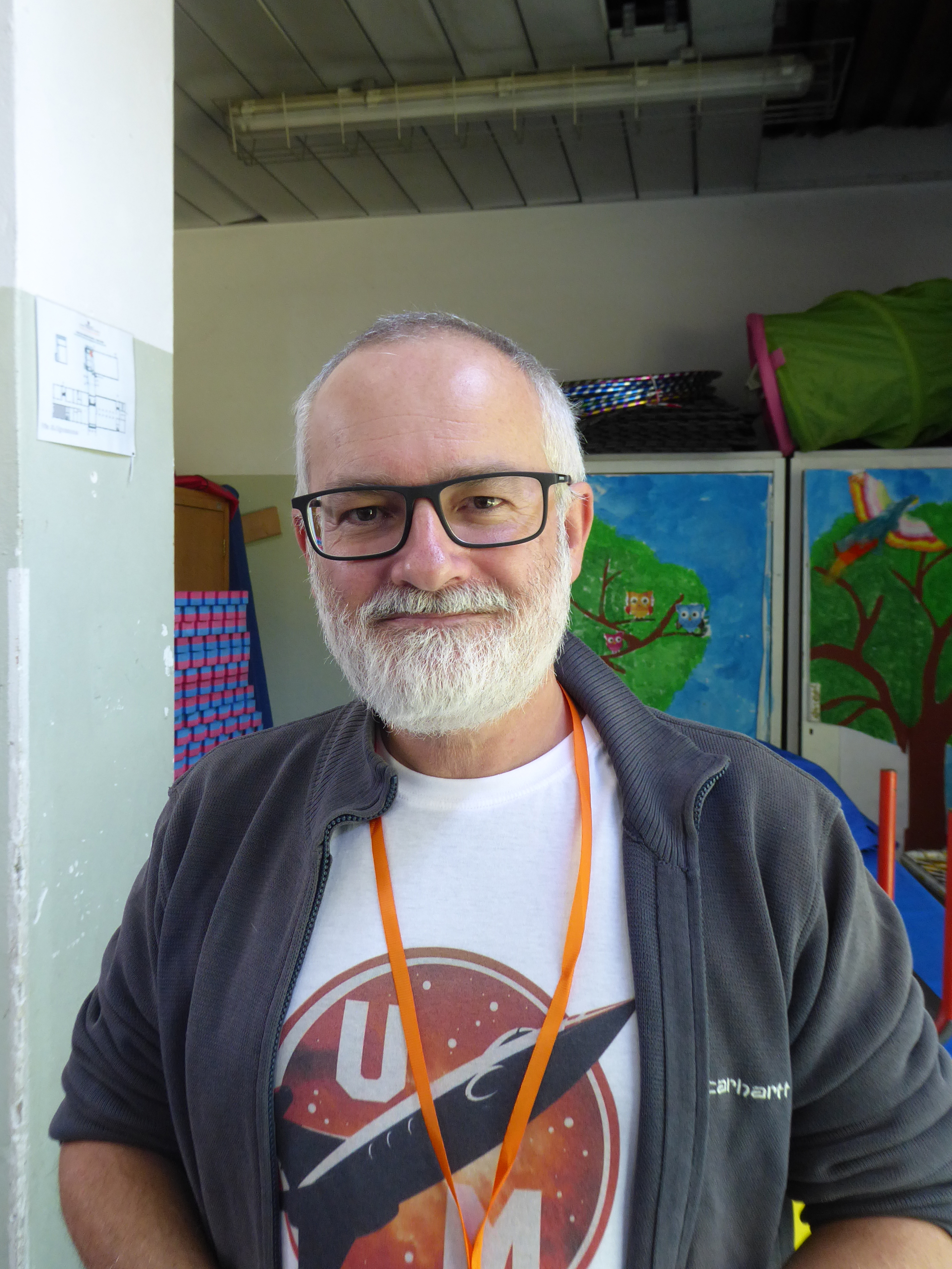
- Franco Brambilla in 2019
- Born: 23 March 1967 (age 58); Milan, Italy

Franco Brambilla (born 23 March 1967) is an Italian science fiction illustrator.

== Life ==
Brambilla was born on 23 March 1967 in Milan. He was trained at the European Institute of Design.

He is known for using 1970s-style kitsch postcards and then modifying them to add aliens and spacecraft to create fake evidence of routine alien contact in the twentieth century. Some of his postcards feature Star Wars technology and places them in routine scenes.

He is known as the illustrator of the well-known Italian book series Urania.

Franco Brambilla won the "Best artist" Award at Eurocon European Awards Fiuggi March 2009 and the "Best Artist" Award at Italcon, Milano Delos Days 2011, "Carlo Jacono Foundation Award" 2013; "Best Artist" Award at Italcon, Bellaria 2014 and "Best Illustration Award" at Starcon Bellaria 2015, Chianciano 2017 and Stranimondi 2018.
