= Anne Charnock =

Science fiction author

- Occupation: Science fiction author
- Writing career
- Notable work: Dreams Before the Start of Time
- Notable awards: Arthur C. Clarke Award; BSFA Award for Best Short Fiction
- Website: annecharnock.com

Anne Charnock (born 8 June 1954) is a British author of science fiction novels. In 2018, she won the Arthur C. Clarke Award in science fiction, for her novel Dreams Before the Start of Time.

== Career ==
Born in Bolton, England, Charnock has a background in environmental science, journalism, and fine art, which she incorporates into her science fiction writing. She has worked as a science writer for The Guardian and New Scientist, and as a foreign correspondent.

A Calculated Life is set in a dystopian near-future Britain shaped by advances in genetic engineering and corporate power; its protagonist is a ‘simulant’ (part human, part AI) leased to a corporation to generate economic predictions. It was nominated for the 2013 Philip K. Dick Award. Charnock’s novella The Enclave, set in the same world, follows migrant workers attempting to make a living in the UK, and it was published in a quartet of novellas by NewCon Press alongside works by Neil Williamson, Simon Morden and Alastair Reynolds.

Charnock is also the author of Sleeping Embers of an Ordinary Mind (47 North), published in 2015, a novel that braids together past, present and future, with a 15th-century Italian female artist at its centre.

Her 2017 novel Dreams Before the Start of Time (47 North), is set in a future world where artificial wombs have become the primary method of reproduction and infertility has been eradicated. It won the Arthur C. Clarke award for science fiction in 2018. In 2017, it was shortlisted for the British Science Fiction Association (BSFA) Award for Best Novel.

In 2017, Charnock won the BSFA Award for Best Shorter Fiction for her novella The Enclave, published by NewCon. Charnock was a judge during the 2018 James White Award short story competition, and served as a judge for the Kitschies Awards in 2024.

== Awards ==
Year	Work	Award	Category	Result	Ref
2014	A Calculated Life	Philip K. Dick Award	—	Finalist	
2014	A Calculated Life	Kitschies	Golden Tentacle (Dèbut)	Shortlisted	
2018	The Enclave	BSFA Award	Short Fiction	Won	
2018	Dreams Before the Start of Time	Arthur C. Clarke Award	—	Won	
2018	Dreams Before the Start of Time	BSFA Award	Novel	Shortlisted	
2021	"All I Asked For”	BSFA Award	Short Fiction	Shortlisted	

== Bibliography ==
=== Novels ===
- A Calculated Life (2013). Self-published.
- Sleeping Embers of an Ordinary Mind (2015).
- Dreams Before the Start of Time (2017).
- Bridge 108 (2020).

=== Chapbook ===
- The Enclave (2017)

=== Short stories ===
Title	Year Published	Collection / Mag	ISBN	Ref
"A Good Citizen"	2017	"A Good Citizen". 2084. Unsung Stories. 2017.	ISBN 978-1-907389-50-4	
"A Cure for Homesickness"	2018	"A Cure for Homesickness". Shoreline of Infinity (11.5). The New Curiosity Shop. April 2018.	ISBN 978-1-9997002-6-3	
