= James White Award =

Speculative fiction short story competition for amateur writers

The James White Award is an annual short story competition open to writers from around the world. It was established in 2000 to commemorate the life and work of the Irish science fiction author James White. The competition was created to encourage new writers and is not open to professional authors. "Professional author" is defined as one who is eligible for active membership of the Science Fiction Writers of America – that is, a writer with three short story sales to qualifying markets or one novel sale to a qualifying market. Entries must be 6,000 words or less and written in English. The winning story receives a cash prize and publication in Interzone magazine. The award is sponsored by Interzone and the British Science Fiction Association, which took over the administration of the award in 2010.

== Award history ==
The winners and judges of the award, from 2001 until 2019. Bold is winner, others are shortlisted entries.

2001

- Mark Dunn, Think Tank
- Mrs Isobel Hanson, Word – Perfect
- Yvonne Coats, The Resurgence of Gloves
- Derek Paterson, Zenith
- Michael Green, The Night Before Opening (special commendation)

Judging panel: Morgan Llywelyn, Dave Langford, Michael Scott, David Pringle and Michael Carroll.
The award ceremony took place at the Dublin Writers’ Museum.

2002

- David D. Levine, Nucleon
- Janet Barron, Extemophenia
- Lannah Battley, Fear of the alien
- Ciaran Conliffe, The Last Whippoorwill
- Jetse de Vries, Rainmaker on the run

Judging panel: Ian McDonald, Mike Resnick, Kim Newman, Michael Carroll and David Pringle.
The award ceremony took place in Queen's University Belfast.

2003

- Julian West, Vita Brevis Ars Longa
- Jon Matthais, To Protect and to Swerve
- Seamus Sweeney, The Unimortal
- Damian Cox, A Metamorphosis
- Jason Woodward, Outside the Encryption Zone

Judging panel drawn from the science fiction field in the US and Europe: Michael Carroll, David Pringle, Orson Scott Card, Christopher Fowler and Graham Joyce.
The award was presented at a ceremony at the Quality Inn in Walsall immediately following the Novacon 32 Science Fiction Convention.

2004

- Dierdre Ruane, Lost Things Saved in Boxes
- (no shortlist)

Judging panel drawn from the science fiction field in the US and Europe: Lois McMaster Bujold, Michael Carroll, Peter F. Hamilton, Christopher Priest and David Pringle.
The award was presented at a ceremony at Winter Gardens, in Blackpool, on Sunday 11 April 2004. This was the venue for Concourse, the National British Convention, also known as Eastercon.

2005

- Elizebeth Hopkinson, A Short History of the Dream Library
- Dave Gullen, Everything is Easy Now
- Eve Power, Harmemoric Asylum
- Gary Spencer, Heartbroken Things
- Graham Bensley, Following the Khiserians

Judging panel: Andy Cox, Jasper Fforde, Michael Carroll, Teresa Nielsen Hayden and the late Robert Sheckley.
The award was presented at Interaction, The World Science Fiction Convention 2005, during the Hugo Award ceremony in the Scottish Exhibition Centre on Sunday 7 August 2005.

2006

- Jennifer Harwood-Smith, The Faces of My Friends
- Simon Cooper, Happiness Worms On Xam???
- Alan Heal, Hitchhikers
- Gary Spencer, Matthews Conundrum of Inanimacy
- Derek Willmer, Version2

Judging panel drawn from the science fiction field in Europe: Kelly Link, Alastair Reynolds, Andy Cox and Michael Carroll.
The award was presented at Octocon, the National Science Fiction Convention in Ireland on Saturday 14 October 2006.

2007

The judges made the decision not to make an award.

2008-9

No competition.

2010

- James Bloomer, Flock, Shoal, Herd
- David L Clements, His Final Experiment
- Dan Purdue, Are Friends Electric
- David John Baker, In Memories Not Yet Made

The award was presented at the British Science Fiction Association AGM in June 2010 and the judges included the novelist Ian Whates and the Interzone editor Andy Cox. The winning story was printed in Interzone 232.

2011

- Colum Paget, Invocation of the Lurker
- Gaea Denker-Lehrman – Solvers
- Darren Goossens – Circle
- David McGroarty – A Traveller from an Antique Land
- Sarah Stanton – Chrysanthemum

Judging panel: the novelists Jon Courtenay Grimwood and Juliet E. McKenna, and the Interzone editor Andrew Cox.
The award was presented at Olympus 2012 on 7 April.

2012/13

- Shannon Fay, You First Meet the Devil At A Church Fête
- Philip Suggars – Automatic Diamanté
- Jonathan Bloxsom - Academic
- Dan Campbell - All the Distances
- Darren Goossens - Every Useless Parameter
- JS Richardson - The Well-Deceived

Judging panel: Hugo award winner Ian McDonald, Nebula award winner Aliette de Bodard and the Interzone editors Andrew Cox and Andrew Hedgecox.
The award was presented at EightSquaredCon (2013's Eastercon) in Bradford.

The winning story was published in Interzone issue 246.

A runner up prize was awarded to Philip Suggars for his story Automatic Diamanté. This story was published in Interzone issue 247.

The James White Award changed the date given to the competition in this year - future dates reflect the year the award was presented rather than the date on which the competition opened for entries.

2014

- DJ Cockburn – Beside The Dammed River
- Katie Lee – Appiness
- Vina Jie-Min Prasad - Flesh and Bone
- Cindy George – Grumpy Old Man
- Benjamin C. Kinney – The Demands of Iron

Judging panel: authors Sophia McDougall, Emma Newman and BSFA Award winner Adam Roberts.
The judges awarded a special commendation to Vina Jie-Min Prasad's Flesh and Bone.

The award was presented at Satellite4 (the 2014 Eastercon) in Glasgow).

The winning story was published in Interzone 253 and in The Year's Best Science Fiction: Thirty-Second Annual Collection (2015) edited by Gardner Dozois.

2015

- Mack Leonard – Midnight Funk Association
- Patrick Martin – Ideas Machine, Suffolk Street
- Jedd Cole – Relics of the All-Legend
- Jessica Lilien – The Simple 12-Step Solution to the 3×3 Hypercube in Minkowski Spacetime
- Winnie M Li – White Fur

Judging panel: authors Dave Hutchinson, Stephanie Saulter and Gareth L Powell.
The award was presented at Dysprosium (the 2015 Eastercon) in London).

2016

- David Cleden - Rock, Paper, Incisors
- Trina Marie Phillips - Deadly Dance
- Jason Kimble - If Only Kissing Made It So
- Morgan Parks - Let The Bells Ring Out
- Matt Dovey - (Perhaps The Answer Is) That We Question At All
- Jon Lasser - Wreckwalkers

Judging panel: the authors Neil Williamson, RJ Booth and Ian Sales.
The award was presented at the 2016 Eastercon (Mancunicon) in Manchester.

2017

- Stuart Horn - The Morrigan
- Steve Dubois - Don
- Beth Plutchak - Skin and Bone
- Elsie WK Donald - The Cut
- Cameron Johnston - The Dying Glass

Judging panel: Lorna Gibbs, David Gullen and Konrad Walewski.
The judges also awarded a special commendation to May the Pain Guide You Home by Daniel Roy.

2018

- Dustin Blair Steinacker - Two Worlds Apart
- Matthew Eeles - Imago
- Sarah Pauling - Ms. Höffern Stays Abreast of the News
- Sarah Palmer - My Fault
- E.M Faulds - The Big I Am

Judging panel: Anne Charnock, RJ Barker and Una McCormack.
The judges also awarded a special commendation to A Sip of Pombé by Gustavo Bondoni.

2019

- David Maskill - Limitations
- Bryn Fazakerley - Better Lost Than Loved
- Mica Scotti Kole - Bug on Bug
- Koji A Dae - Digital Nomad
- Stephen Cashmore - The Last Words of Harry Niffen

Judging panel: Justina Robson, Chris Beckett, and Donna Scott.
The judges also awarded a special commendation to runner up Property Crime by Michael Donoghue – who missed out by the narrowest margin in the award's history.

2020

The award was canceled due to issues with the website and problems caused by certain global crises.
