= Vicente Segrelles =

Spanish comic book artist and writer (born 1940)

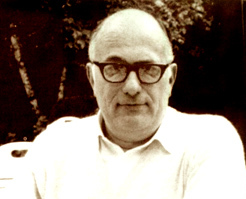
- A Spanish comic book artist and writer
- Born: September 9, 1940 (age 86) Barcelona, Spain
- Areas: Cartoonist, Writer, Artist
- Notable works: The Mercenary (El Mercenario)

Vicente Segrelles (born 9 September 1940) is a Spanish comic book artist and writer.

Segrelles gained popularity in Europe for his painted comic book epic The Mercenary (El Mercenario), started in 1980. Set in a medieval fantasy world, El Mercenario follows the adventures of a mercenary in his fight against evil. Unusual for the craft of comic books, every panel of his work for this series—which has reached 14 issues so far—is painted in oil, a time-consuming process.

Segrelles was also the cover artist for the Italian science fiction magazine Urania from 1988 to 1991.

== Bibliography ==
- 1970 Lazarillo de Tormes/El licenciado Vidriera scripted by María Teresa Díaz
- 1981 El Mercenario 1-El Pueblo del Fuego Sagrado for "Cimoc"
- 1983 El Mercenario 2-La Fórmula
- 1984 El Mercenario 3-Las Pruebas
- 1988 El Mercenario 4-El Sacrificio
- 1991 El Mercenario 5-La Fortaleza
- 1992 Histoires Fantastiques: Une Histoire du Mercenaire
- 1992 El Sheriff Pat 1-Expediente Mojado
- 1992 El Sheriff Pat 2-En la Santa María
- 1992 Los Errores de Colón para "Cimoc"
- 1992 1992 (Published in various magazines)
- 1993 El Mercenario 6-La Bola Negra
- 1993 Veinte años de Cómic
- 1995 El Mercenario 7-El Viaje
- 1996 El Mercenario 8-Año Mil, el Fin del Mundo
- 1997 El Mercenario 9-Los Ascendientes Perdidos
- 1997 Un Alto en el Camino
- La Evidencia (Published in various magazines)
- 1998 El Mercenario 10-Gigantes
- 1999 El Dragón
- 2000 El Mercenario 11-La Huida
- 2002 El Mercenario 12-El Rescate
- 2003 El Mercenario 13-El Rescate II

== See also ==
- Josep Segrelles
- Segrelles Museum
