= Premio Omelas =

The Premio Omelas (Omelas Prize) is an award dedicated to stories written in Italian that pertain to both human rights and science fiction. Both short stories and novels are eligible for the prize, which is offered in conjunction with Amnesty International Gruppo Italia 233, working in Palermo. The prize is awarded to the story which best represents the theme of "Using literature to stop torture".

The competition is divided in three sections:

— Omelas Science Fiction: General section, open to anyone

— Omelas School: Section limited to the works of students in primary and secondary schools.

— Omelas Trek: Section opened to all authors, but limited to stories which pertain to the Star Trek universe.

== See also ==
- Urania Award
