= El Mercenario =

Science fiction comics series by Vicente Segrelles

- Cover of El Mercenario #1 (1982). Art by Vicente Segrelles.

Publication information
- Publisher: Norma Editorial
- Schedule: Irregular
- Format: Ongoing series
- Genre: Science fiction comics
- Publication date: 1980 – 2003
- No. of issues: 13
- Main character(s): The Mercenary; Arnoldo de Vinci; The Grand Lama; Nan-Tay; Claust

Creative team
- Created by: Vicente Segrelles
- Written by: Vicente Segrelles
- Artist: Vicente Segrelles

El Mercenario (English: The Mercenary) is a science fiction comics series by the Spanish artist Vicente Segrelles, published beginning in 1980. An unusual feature for a comic book, every panel is painted in oil, a time-consuming technique. The series is known for the great attention paid to the depiction of landscapes.

== Publication history ==
The series was initially serialized, beginning in 1980, in the journal Cimoc, before moving on, beginning in 1982, to be published as a collection of 13 albums, with at least 11 having been translated into English (primarily by NBM).

Beginning 1998, Segrelles began using the computer to illustrate most of his comics. The 10th edition of The Mercenary, Giants, was the first to include pages designed entirely on computer.

The latest volume was published in 2003.

== Plot ==
The Mercenary tells the story of a mysterious and anonymous mercenary from a hidden valley called The Country of the Clouds. In this secluded region, the human race develops a culture different from the rest of the world, all while confronting flying dragons, reptilian giants, monsters, Amazons, and other characters familiar from the world of heroic fantasy.

A regular feature of The Mercenary adventures are beautiful women, often semi-nude. Most of the stories include an unusual twist.

== Characters ==
- The Mercenary — mysterious and anonymous, he rides on domesticated flying dragons
- Arnoldo de Vinci — member of the Order of Crater led by the Grand Lama; an inventor, he supplies weapons to The Mercenary
- Nan-Tay — beautiful young warrior responsible for the safety and protection of the Order of the Crater; she aids The Mercenary in his quests
- Claust — a recurring villain, he is a cunning, ambitious, petty alchemist who is the enemy of the monks of the Order of the Crater

== Influences ==
The Mercenary is a science fantasy adventure. Although the setting and the style resembles the medieval milieu of classic fantasy tales, it is actually a science fiction story. Magic is due to advanced technology and aliens, while giants and monsters are natural fauna or the results of radiation. The only blatant magic is in a set of apocryphal stories told by the Mercenary to impress his companion Nan-Tay (album 10, "Giants").

== List of albums ==
1. The Formula from Hell (Norma Editorial, May 1982)
2. The Trial of Strength (Norma Editorial, May 1983)
3. The Floating Fortress (Norma Editorial, Mar. 1984)
4. The Sacrifice (Norma Editorial, May 1988)
5. The Water Fortress (Norma Editorial, Dec. 1991)
6. The Black Sphere (Norma Editorial, May 1993)
7. The Journey (Norma Editorial, Aug. 1995)
8. The Year 1000 (Norma Editorial, 1996)
9. The Lost Civilization (Norma Editorial, 1998)
10. The Giants (Norma Editorial, 1998) — short stories
11. The Flight (Norma Editorial, 2000)
12. The Ransom I (Norma Editorial, 2002)
13. The Ransom II (Norma Editorial, 2003)
- "Jubilee Edition" (10 page mini-comic)
