= La Roche de Cestre =

Coordinates: 47.423860°N 0.902581°E

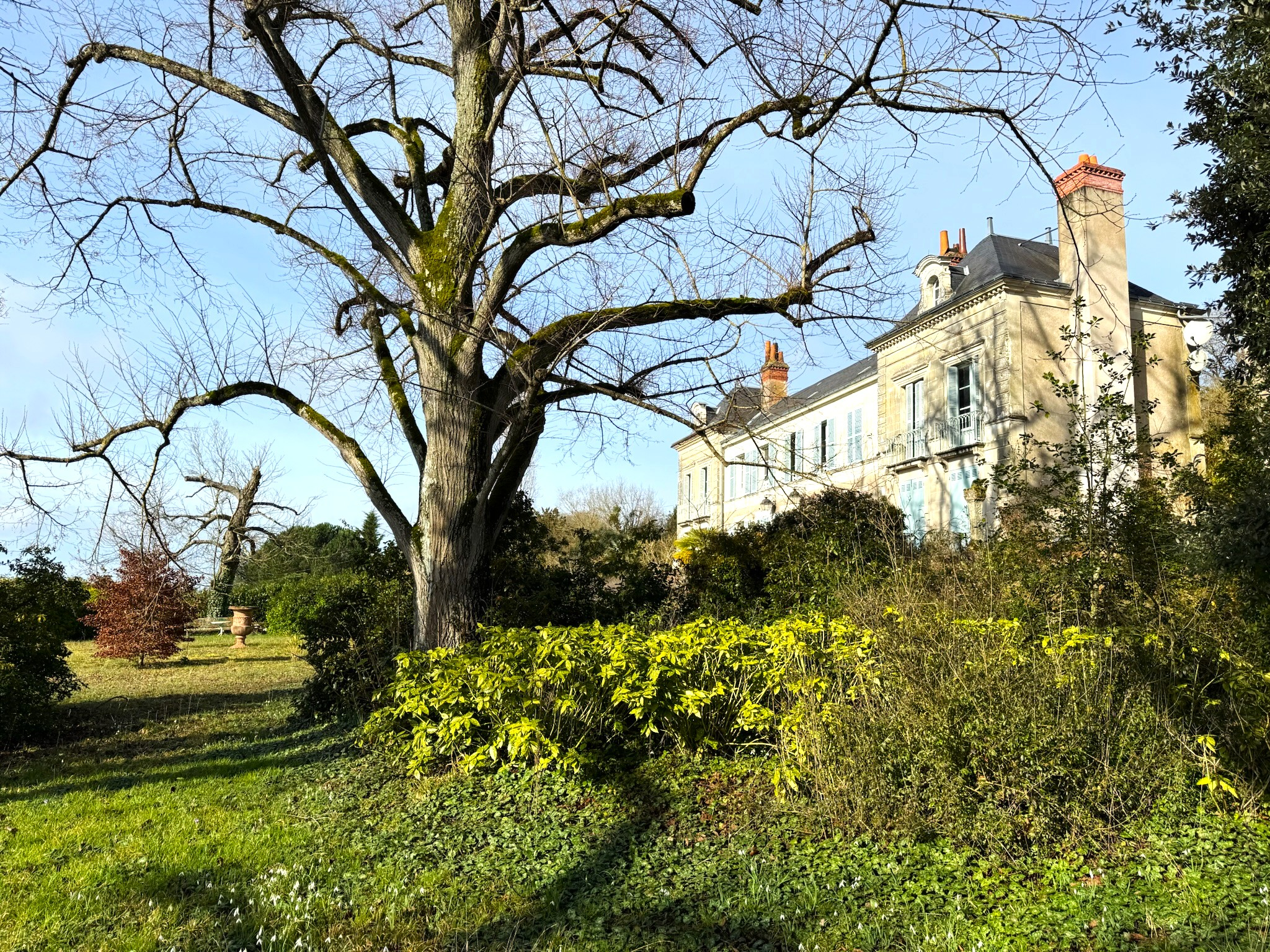
La Roche-de-Cestre

La Roche de Cestre is a historic manor house located in the commune of Noizay in the Indre-et-Loire department in France, south of Paris. The estate is situated in the Touraine wine region near the Loire River and belongs to the AOC Vouvray. It is a private estate known for its neoclassical architecture, scenic location, and its wine cellars carved into the rock.

== History ==
The manor house was built towards the end of the 18th century. The name La Roche de Cestre refers to a rocky outcrop (roche). The addition Cestre may refer to a historical owner or an old field name (a documented etymology is not available). In 1875, the estate underwent a significant expansion, with the addition of two pavilions flanking the original structure.

Unlike the nearby Château de Noizay, which was involved in the French Wars of Religion in 1560, La Roche de Cestre appears to have escaped destruction during wartime. The estate remained in private ownership for generations, passing through family inheritance.

== Architecture ==
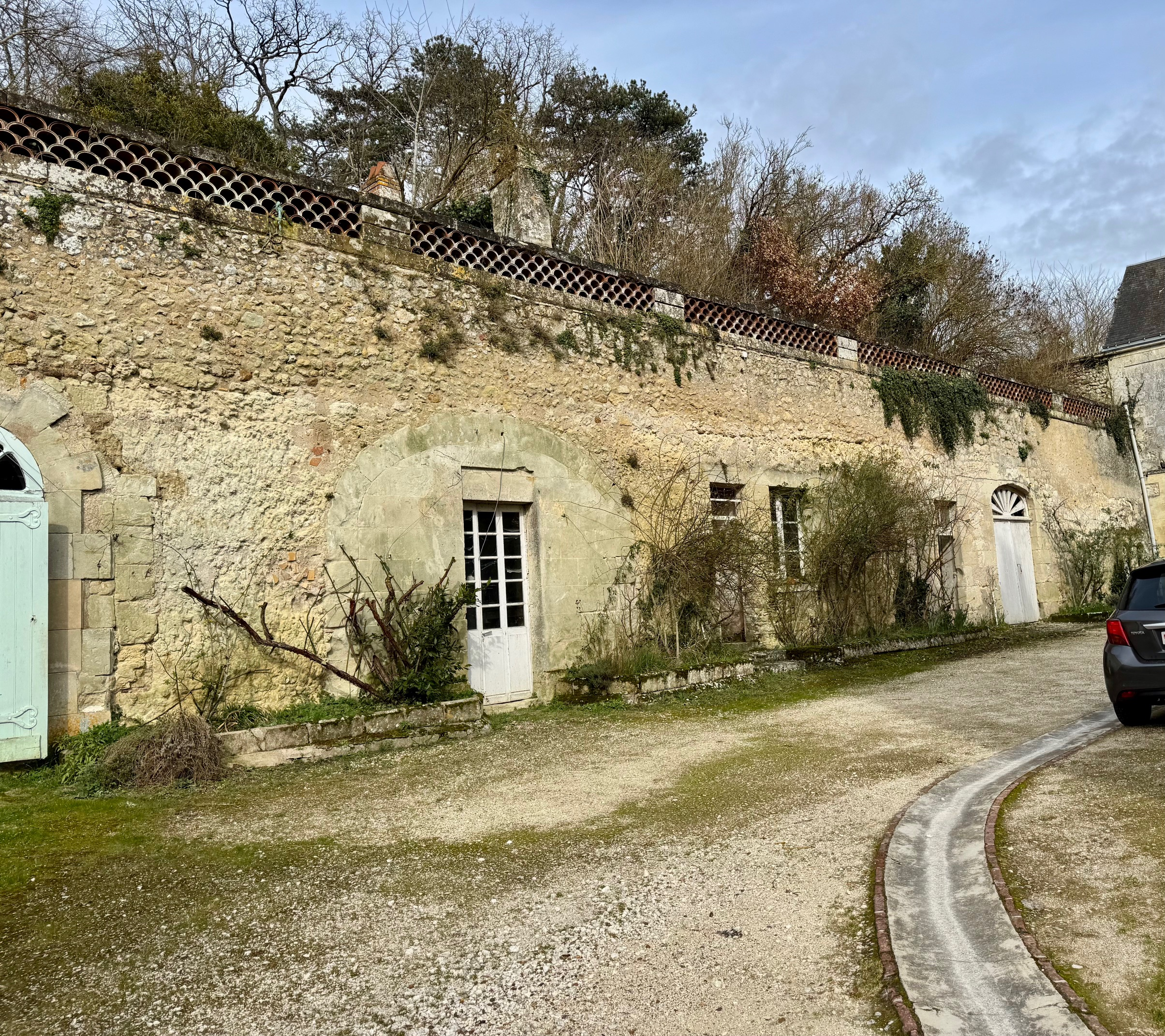
Vaulted cave in the backyard

The architectural style of Roche de Cestre is characteristic of the late 18th century, displaying neoclassical elements. The main facade is symmetrical, with a central residential section and the pavilions added in 1875. The masonry is composed of light-colored tuff stone, typical of the region. The estate includes a chapel, though its exact date of construction is unknown; it may be a rock-cut chapel, similar to the one found at the nearby Manoir d’Anzan.

Beneath the manor house and within the hillside are extensive, rock-carved vaulted cellars. Some of these structures date back to the late 16th century and were traditionally used for wine storage.

A representative gate provides access to the walled property, though details about its design are not explicitly described in sources. Overall, the manor's architecture reflects the transition from the Ancien Régime to the modern bourgeoisie: an elegant country residence with later historicist additions.

== Viticulture ==
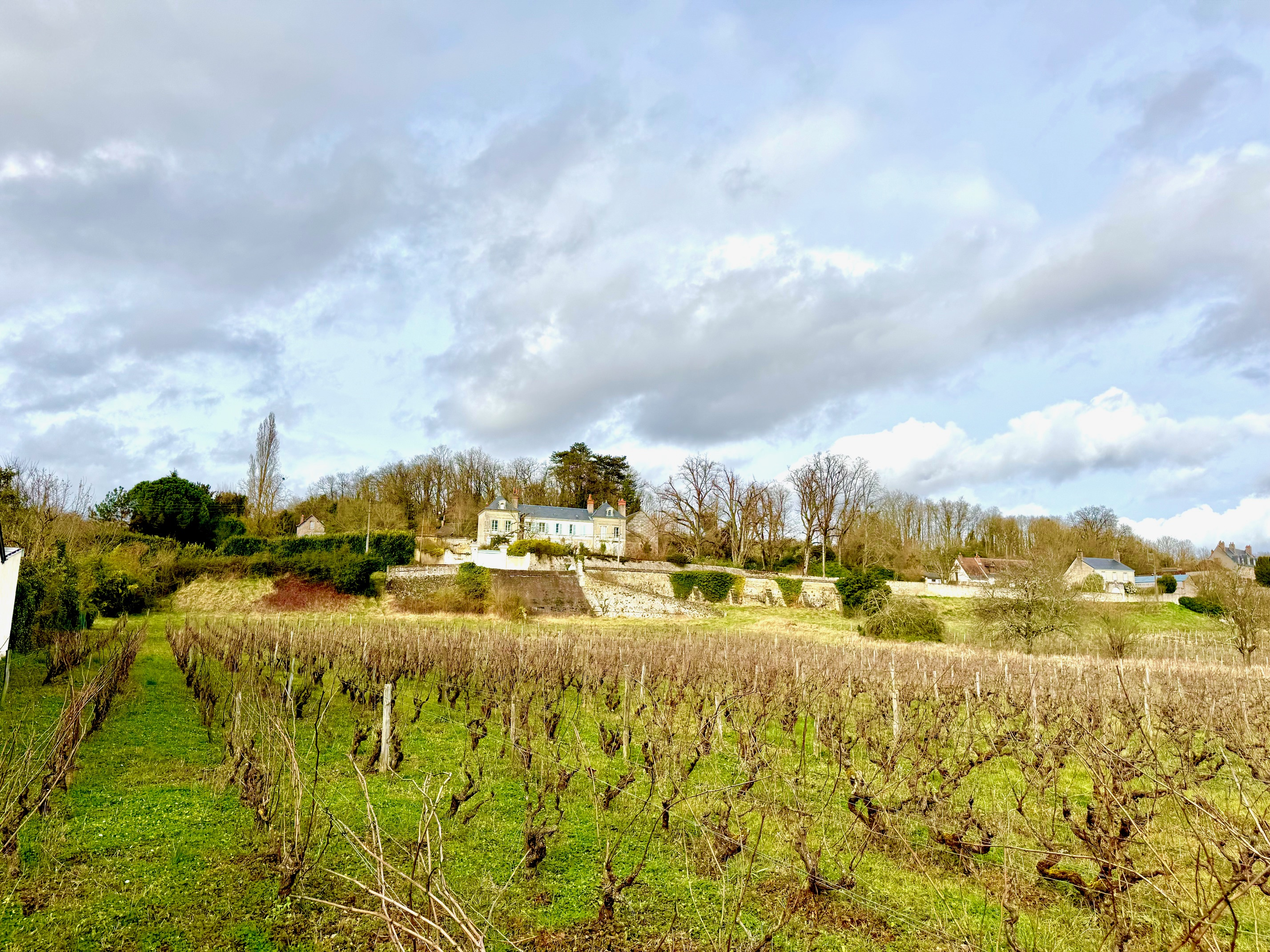
Vineyard in front of the house

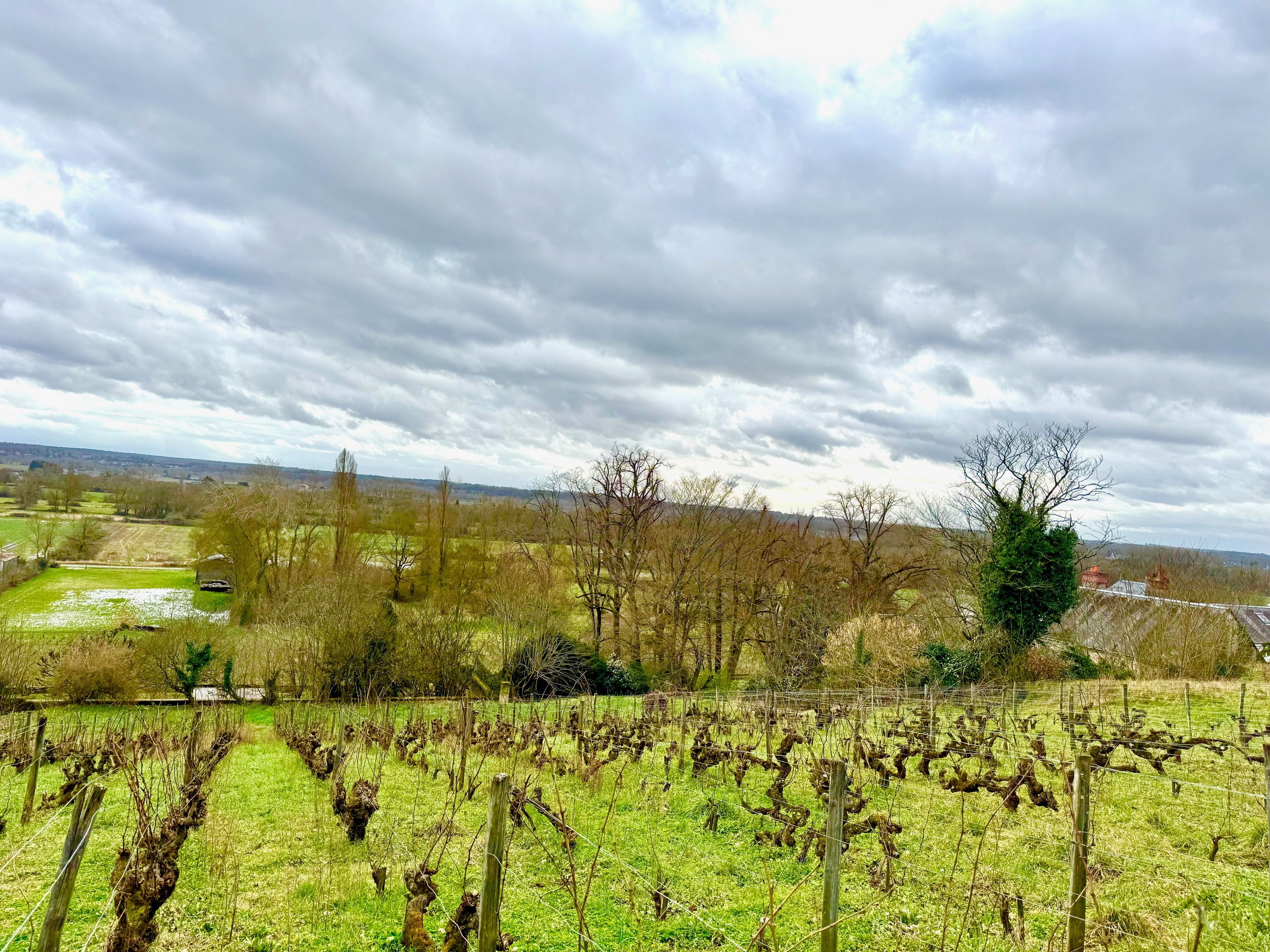
Vineyard behind the house

The Manoir de la Roche de Cestre features its own vineyards. They are part of the controlled designation of origin Vouvray and are primarily planted with Chenin Blanc (also known as Pineau de la Loire), the dominant grape variety of the appellation. The 50- to 80-year-old vines grow on calcareous clay soils in the hills above the Loire River, producing fresh, fruity, and long-lived white wines.

The estate's two vineyard parcels are cultivated by different winemakers. One of them is Vouvray vintner Michel Autran, who has practiced organic viticulture in Noizay since 2011. He uses grapes from the La Roche de Cestre site for his cuvées, such as Ciel Rouge.

== Current Use and Access ==
The Manoir de la Roche de Cestre remains in private ownership and is primarily used as a residence. Unlike some castles and manors in the Loire region, it is not regularly open to the public.

== Cultural Significance ==
Although the Manoir de la Roche de Cestre has not gained widespread recognition, it contributes to the cultural heritage of the wine region of Touraine. It is part of a collection of historic estates in Noizay that represent the relationship between viticulture and residential culture in the Loire Valley. The combination of manor house, vineyards, and cellars exemplifies the cultural landscape of the Loire Valley, which is recognized as a UNESCO World Heritage Site. The municipality of Noizay regards the manor as part of its local architectural heritage, although—unlike the Château de Noizay, Grand Coteau, or Manoir d’Anzan—it is not listed as a Monument historique under heritage protection.

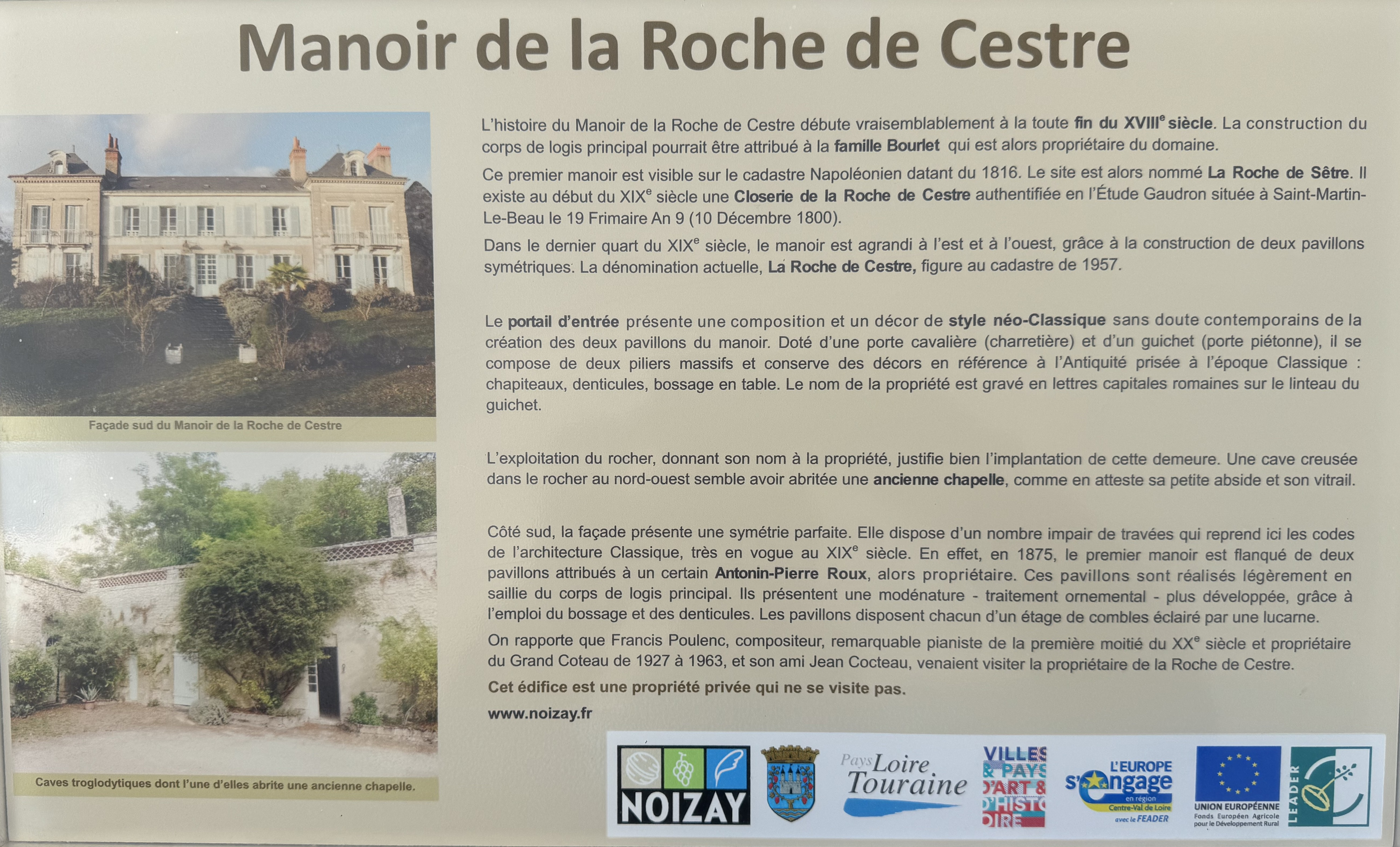
History and architecture
