= Arthur J. Krim =

American geographer and architectural historian

Arthur J. Krim is an American geographer and architectural historian. He was a founding member of the Society for Commercial Archeology, a preservationist group.

Krim has taught at the Boston Architectural Center, Clark University, and Salve Regina University, and has consulted for the Cambridge Historical Commission, Massachusetts Historical Commission and others. He has published in Landscape, the Journal of Cultural Geography, and the Journal of Historical Geography. In 2016, he was an advocate for designating the Boston Citgo sign, which The Atlantic called "one of the hub's best known pieces of technology" but was threatened with dismantling, as a historic landmark. The Boston Globe referred to Krim as "the sign's unofficial historian". The New York Times said Krim "spearheaded" the earlier restoration of the sign.

== Books ==
Krim wrote the book Route 66: Iconography of the American Highway (originally published in 2005), about U.S. Route 66, which received the J. B. Jackson prize of the American Association of Geographers for the best book in cultural geography in 2006.
