= William Stage =

William Stage may refer to:

- Charles W. Stage (1868–1946), American politician known as Billy Stage when he was a track athlete and baseball umpire
- William "Stage" Boyd (1889–1935), American actor in New York
- Billy Stage (1893–1957), English footballer, formerly with Bury FC and other clubs
- Wm. Stage (born 1951), American journalist in the Midwest
