= C.I. Brink Sign Company =

American sign manufacturer

The C.I. Brink Sign Company was an American sign manufacturer and outdoor advertising firm. Founded by Charles Idoff Brink, the company was based in Boston, Massachusetts. It is known for constructing Boston's famous Citgo sign.

== History ==
C.I. Brink was founded by Charles Idoff Brink in the 1890s. He was born in Ängelholm, Sweden, and moved to Dorchester, Massachusetts in 1892. Brink opened his business shortly thereafter, and the company became a specialist in neon tube bending and neon signs.

C.I. Brink first constructed what would become the Boston's famous Citgo sign in 1940, overlooking 660 Beacon Street in Kenmore Square. It was a Cities Services sign before eventually being replaced by the Citgo logo in 1965. C.I. Brink invented the bulbs that light the sign, which features over five miles of neon tubing, requiring about 250 transformers in order to operate. There was initially a dedicated Brink employee whose sole job was to maintain the Citgo sign.

C.I. Brink also built Revere Cooper and Brass Inc.'s neon sign in 1948. The company hung 126 neon tubes on a purely copper frame, which was a rare technique at the time.
