= Cultural landscape =

Landscape, which is permanently embossed by humans

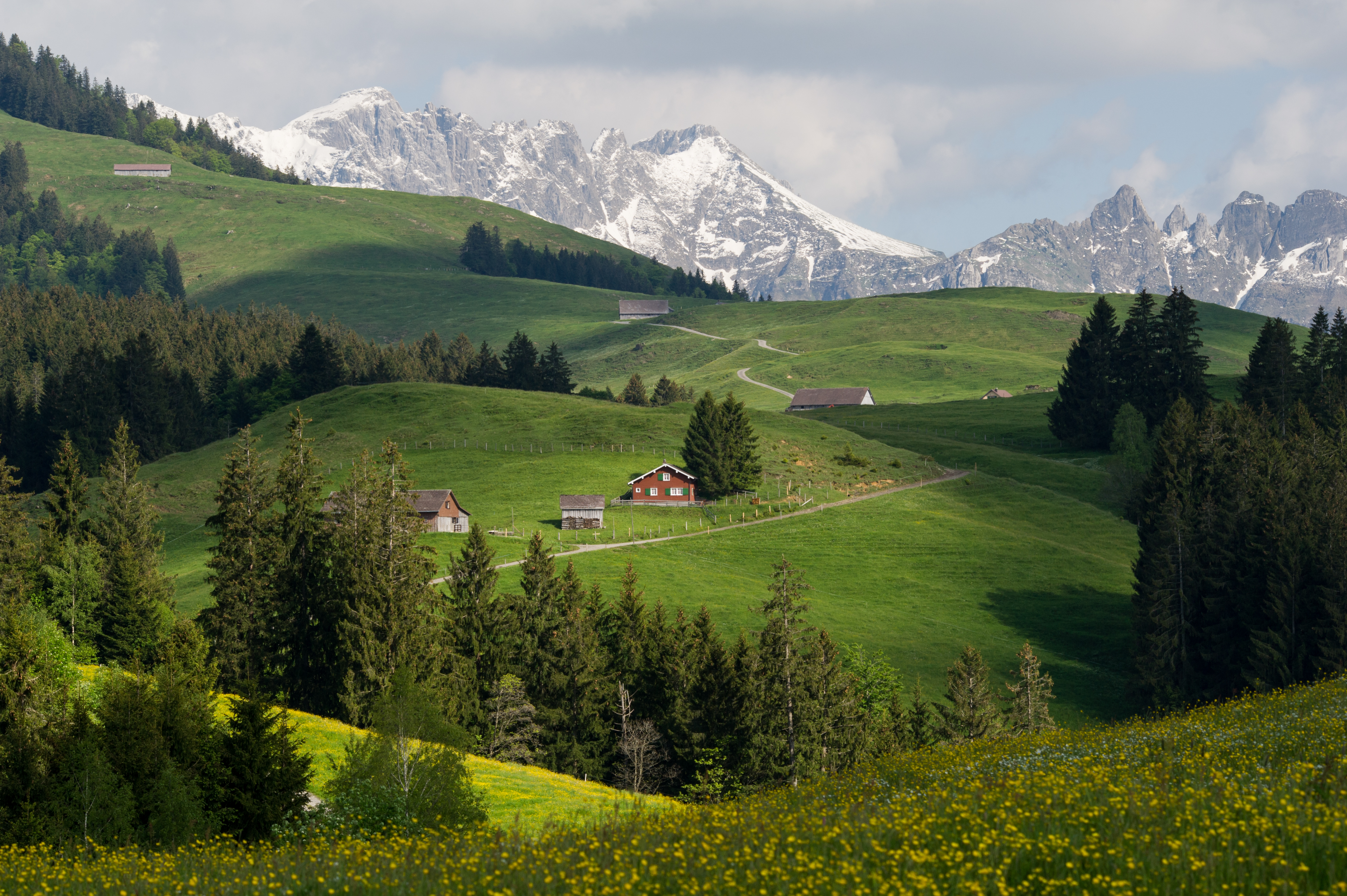
Neckertal pasture hillside in Switzerland

Cultural landscape is a term used in the fields of geography, ecology, and heritage studies, to describe a symbiosis of human activity and environment. As defined by the World Heritage Committee, it is the "cultural properties [that] represent the combined works of nature and of man" and falls into three main categories:

1. "a landscape designed and created intentionally by man"
2. an "organically evolved landscape" which may be a "relict (or fossil) landscape" or a "continuing landscape"
3. an "associative cultural landscape" which may be valued because of the "religious, artistic or cultural associations of the natural element."

== Historical development ==
The concept of 'cultural landscapes' can be found in the European tradition of landscape painting. From the 16th century onwards, many European artists painted landscapes in favor of people, diminishing the people in their paintings to figures subsumed within broader, regionally specific landscapes.

The word "landscape" itself combines "land" with a verb of Germanic origin, "scapjan/schaffen" to mean, literally, "shaped lands". Lands were then considered shaped by natural forces, and the unique details of such landshaffen (shaped lands) became themselves the subject of 'landscape' paintings.

Geographer Otto Schlüter is credited with having first formally used “cultural landscape” as an academic term in the early 20th century. In 1908, Schlüter argued that by defining geography as a Landschaftskunde (landscape science) this would give geography a logical subject matter shared by no other discipline. He defined two forms of landscape: the Urlandschaft (transl. original landscape) or landscape that existed before major human induced changes and the Kulturlandschaft (transl. 'cultural landscape') a landscape created by human culture. The major task of geography was to trace the changes in these two landscapes.

It was Carl O. Sauer, a human geographer, who was probably the most influential in promoting and developing the idea of cultural landscapes. Sauer was determined to stress the agency of culture as a force in shaping the visible features of the Earth's surface in delimited areas. Within his definition, the physical environment retains a central significance, as the medium with and through which human cultures act. His classic definition of a 'cultural landscape' reads as follows:

The cultural landscape is fashioned from a natural landscape by a cultural group. Culture is the agent, the natural area is the medium, the cultural landscape is the result

Since Schlüter's first formal use of the term, and Sauer's effective promotion of the idea, the concept of 'cultural landscapes has been variously used, applied, debated, developed and refined within academia. In the 1950s, for instance, J.B. Jackson and his publication 'Landscape' influenced a generation of particularly American scholars, including architectural historians Denise Scott Brown, and Gwendolyn Wright.

By 1992, the World Heritage Committee elected to convene a meeting of the 'specialists' to advise and assist redraft the Committee's Operational Guidelines to include 'cultural landscapes' as an option for heritage listing properties that were neither purely natural nor purely cultural in form (i.e. 'mixed' heritage).

== Relevance of concept ==
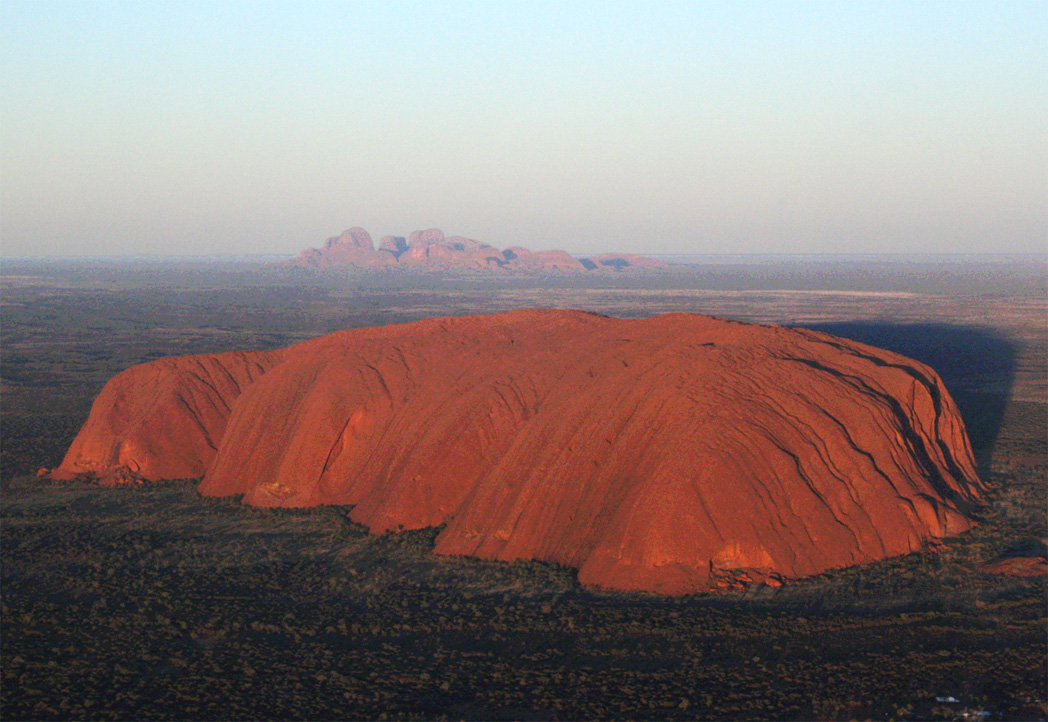
Uluṟu-Kata Tjuṯa National Park, sacred landscape of the aboriginal Australian, classified as "cultural landscape" by Unesco

The World Heritage Committee's adoption and use of the concept of 'cultural landscapes' has seen multiple specialists around the world, and many nations identifying 'cultural landscapes', assessing 'cultural landscapes', heritage listing 'cultural landscapes', managing 'cultural landscapes', and effectively making 'cultural landscapes' known and visible to the world, with very practical ramifications and challenges.

A 2006 academic review of the combined efforts of the World Heritage Committee, multiple specialists around the world, and nations to apply the concept of 'cultural landscapes', observed and concluded that:

Although the concept of landscape has been unhooked for some time from its original art associations ... there is still a dominant view of landscapes as an inscribed surface, akin to a map or a text, from which cultural meaning and social forms can simply be read.

Within academia, any system of interaction between human activity and natural habitat is regarded as a cultural landscape. In a sense this understanding is broader than the definition applied within UNESCO, including, as it does, almost the whole of the world's occupied surface, plus almost all the uses, ecologies, interactions, practices, beliefs, concepts, and traditions of people living within cultural landscapes. Following on this, geographer Xoán Paredes defines cultural landscape as:

... the environment modified by the human being in the course of time, the long-term combination between anthropic action on this environment and the physical constraints limiting or conditioning human activity. It is a geographical area – including natural and cultural resources – associated to historical evolution, which gives way to a recognizable landscape for a particular human group, up to the point of being identifiable as such by others.

The concept of cultural landscape is useful for the sustainable management and conservation of heritage. Adopting a cultural landscape perspective can interlink individual aspects of cultural heritage, such as historic buildings, regional material resources, and vernacular construction techniques, into a unified notion of identity and place. This can unify tangible and intangible heritage, expose risks within complex system dynamics, and draw the focus of conservation from the protection of past fabric towards the management of future change. It can be a vehicle for people-centric approaches, which support local ownership and participation at cultural heritage sites. This paradigm aligns the management of the historic environment with contemporary attitudes to environmental management in general, which are also influenced by cultural landscape perspectives.

Some universities now offer specialist degrees in the study of cultural landscapes, including, for instance, the Universities of Naples, St.-Étienne, and Stuttgart who offer a Master of Cultural Landscapes diploma.

== Examples ==
The World Heritage Committee has identified and listed a number of areas or properties as cultural landscapes of universal value to humankind, including the following:

=== Tongariro National Park, New Zealand (1993) ===
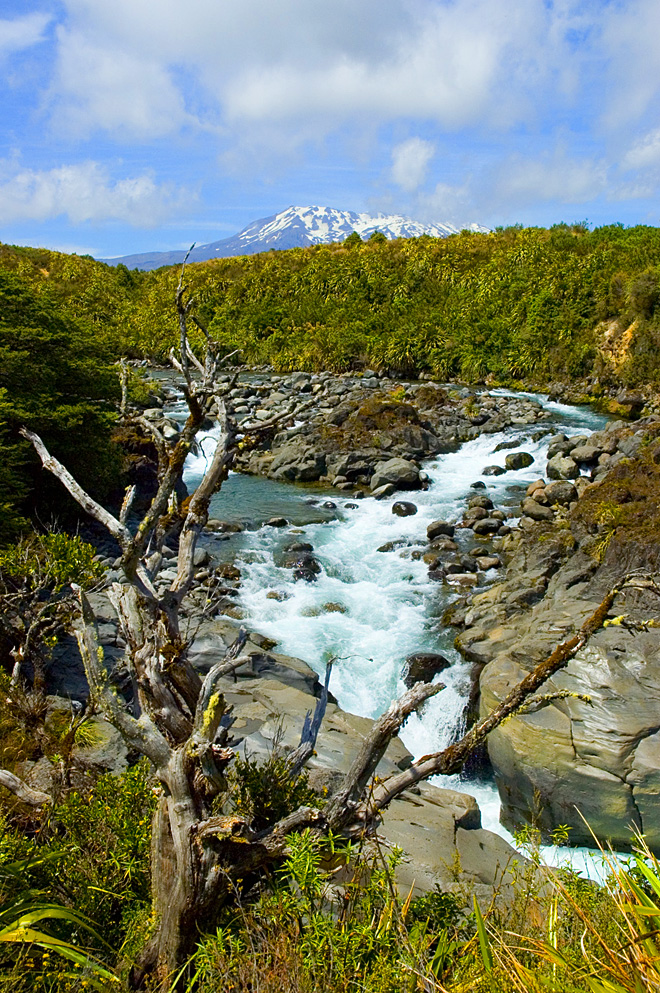
Tongariro Mahuia River in the Tongariro National Park, New Zealand

"In 1993 Tongariro National Park, became the first property to be inscribed on the World Heritage List under the revised criteria describing cultural landscapes. The mountains at the heart of the park have cultural and religious significance for the Maori people and symbolize the spiritual links between this community and its environment. The park has active and extinct volcanoes, a diverse range of ecosystems and some spectacular landscapes."

=== Uluru-Kata Tjuta National Park, Australia (1994) ===
"This park, formerly called Uluru (Ayers Rock – Mount Olga) National Park, features spectacular geological formations that dominate the vast red sandy plain of central Australia. Uluru, an immense monolith, and Kata Tjuta, the rock domes located west of Uluru, form part of the traditional belief system of one of the oldest human societies in the world. The traditional owners of Uluru-Kata Tjuta are the Anangu Aboriginal people."

=== Rice Terraces of Philippine Cordilleras (1995) ===
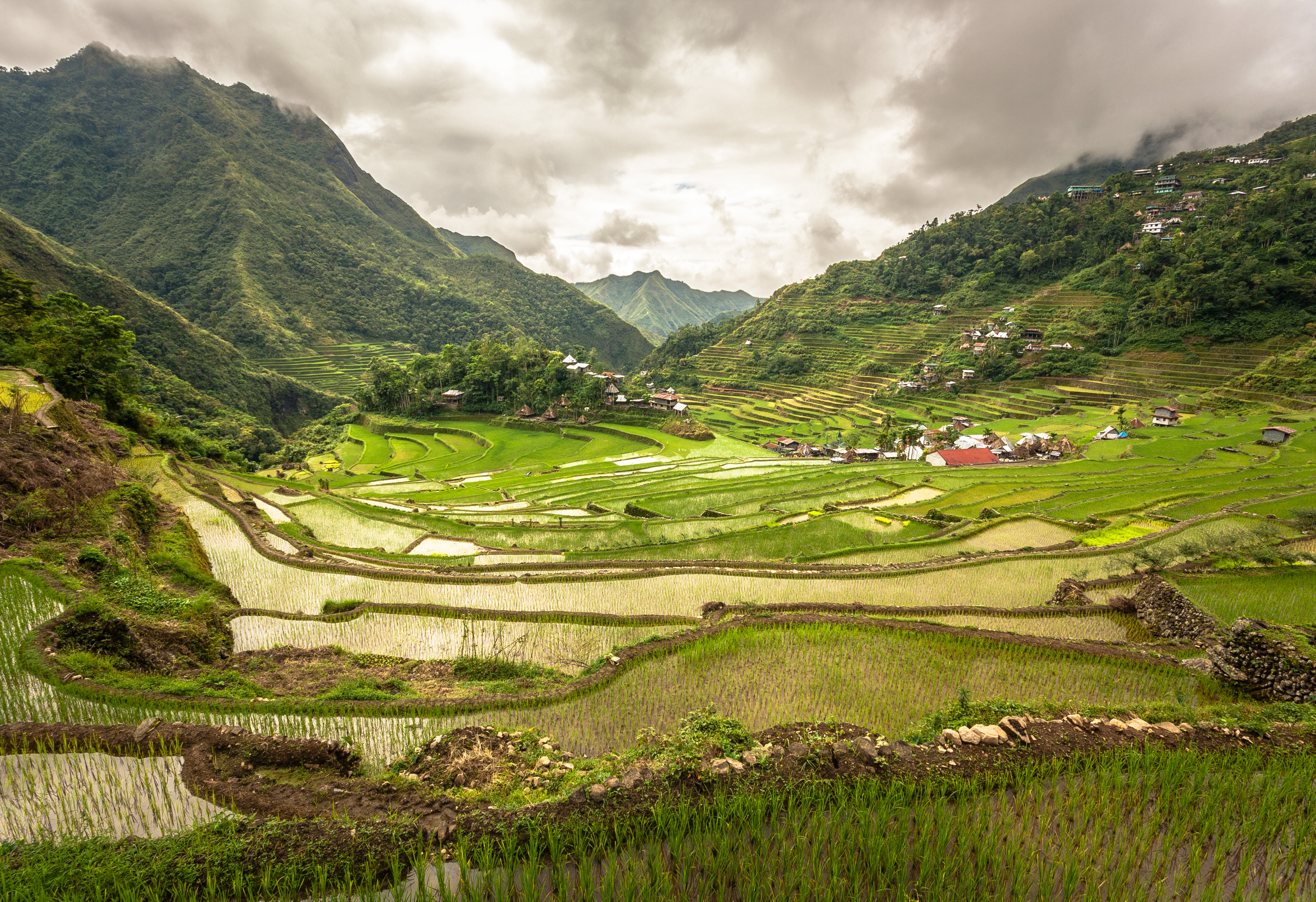
The Batad rice terraces, the Rice Terraces of the Philippine Cordilleras, the first site to be included in the UNESCO World Heritage List cultural landscape category in 1995

"For 2,000 years, the high rice fields of the Ifugao have followed the contours of the mountains. The fruit of knowledge handed down from one generation to the next, and the expression of sacred traditions and a delicate social balance, they have helped to create a landscape of great beauty that expresses the harmony between humankind and the environment."

=== Cultural Landscape of Sintra, Portugal (1995) ===
"In the 19th century Sintra became the first centre of European Romantic architecture. Ferdinand II turned a ruined monastery into a castle where this new sensitivity was displayed in the use of Gothic, Egyptian, Moorish and Renaissance elements and in the creation of a park blending local and exotic species of trees. Other fine dwellings, built along the same lines in the surrounding serra, created a unique combination of parks and gardens which influenced the development of landscape architecture throughout Europe".

=== Portovenere, Cinque Terre, and the Islands (Palmaria, Tino and Tinetto), Italy (1997) ===
"The Ligurian coast between Cinque Terre and Portovenere is a cultural landscape of great scenic and cultural value. The layout and disposition of the small towns and the shaping of the surrounding landscape, overcoming the disadvantages of a steep, uneven terrain, encapsulate the continuous history of human settlement in this region over the past millennium."

=== Hortobágy National Park, Hungary (1999) ===
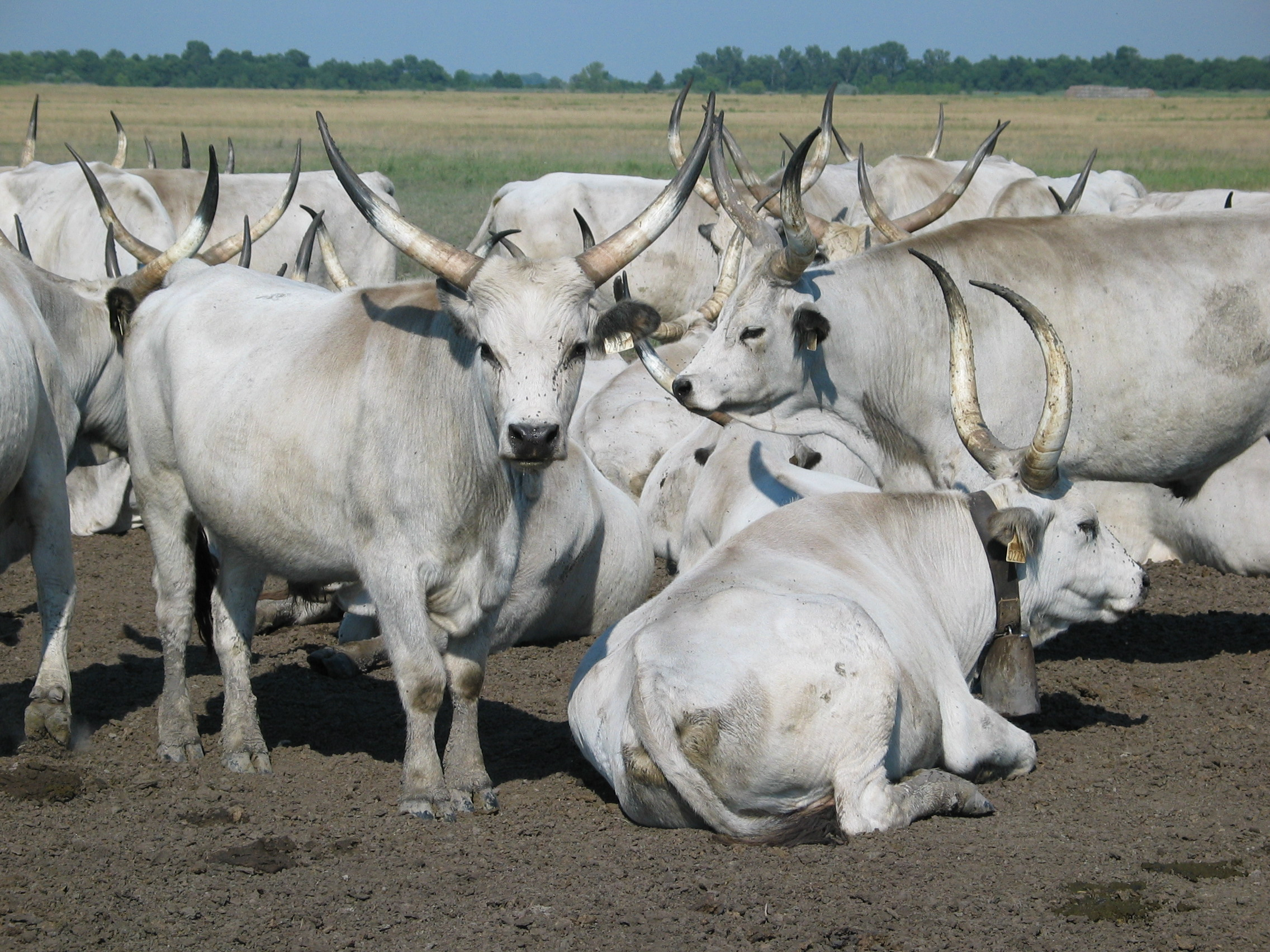
Hungarian Grey Cattle in Hortobágy National Park

Hortobágy National Park is the largest continuous natural grassland in Europe, which means that it was not formed as a result of deforestation or river control. The first Hungarian national park (established in 1973), it is the country's largest protected area (82 thousand hectares). A significant part of it is Biosphere Reserve and a quarter of its area enjoys international protection under the Ramsar Convention on the conservation of wetlands.

=== Matobo Hills, Zimbabwe (2003) ===
The Matobo Hills area exhibits a profusion of distinctive rock landforms rising above the granite shield that covers much of Zimbabwe. The large boulders provide abundant natural shelters and have been associated with human occupation from the early Stone Age right through to early historical times, and intermittently since. They also feature an outstanding collection of rock paintings. The Matopo Hills continue to provide a strong focus for the local community, which still uses shrines and sacred places closely linked to traditional, social and economic activities.

=== Royal Botanic Gardens, Kew (2003) ===
The Royal Botanic Gardens Kew (Kew Gardens), is a historic landscape garden which illustrates significant garden styles from the 18th to 20th centuries. Kew Gardens is home to botanic collections (conserved plants, living plants, and documents) that are of global historical significance and continue to be used today, this includes a herbarium collection with over 8.5 million preserved plant and fungal specimens. The living collections within the gardens cover over 27000 taxa. Since their creation in 1759, the gardens have made a significant and continuous contribution to research into plant diversity and economic botany.

=== Dresden Elbe Valley, Germany (2004) ===
"The 18th- and 19th-century cultural landscape of Dresden Elbe Valley ... features low meadows, and is crowned by the Pillnitz Palace and the centre of Dresden with its numerous monuments and parks from the 16th to 20th centuries. The landscape also features 19th- and 20th-century suburban villas and gardens and valuable natural features."

This landscape was struck from the World Heritage list in 2009, due to the construction of a four lane highway across the Elbe.

=== St Kilda, United Kingdom (2005) ===
The archipelago of St Kilda in the Outer Hebrides of Scotland was originally inscribed as a natural heritage site in 1986 following recommendation by IUCN, due to its superlative natural features and habitats for rare and endangered species of birds. ICOMOS also recommended in 1986 that the property should be listed for a cultural criterion (relating to traditional human settlement), stating that “the St. Kilda archipelago corresponds perfectly to the definition of a cultural and natural property whose value should be taken into consideration in an evaluation complementary to that of IUCN”, however this was not executed by UNESCO.

IUCN commented in their initial evaluation, and the UNESCO committee also stated upon inscription, that the marine environment surrounding the archipelago should be considered for listing and the boundaries extended. The state party had not nominated this in their original application. In response to a report prepared by Greenpeace in 1998 which raised concerns on potential impacts to the site from oil exploration of the surrounding seabed, the boundary was extended in 2004/5 and the property was additionally listed for a further natural criterion (relating to ecological processes). As part of the relisting process, it was re-nominated for two cultural criteria, recommended for listing by ICOMOS, and this time inscribed by UNESCO in 2005 and designated as an 'organically evolved relict cultural landscape'.

"Overlaying the spectacular natural landscape and giving scale to it all, is a rich cultural landscape that bears exceptional testimony to millennia of human occupation."

=== Lavaux Vineyard Terraces, Switzerland (2007) ===
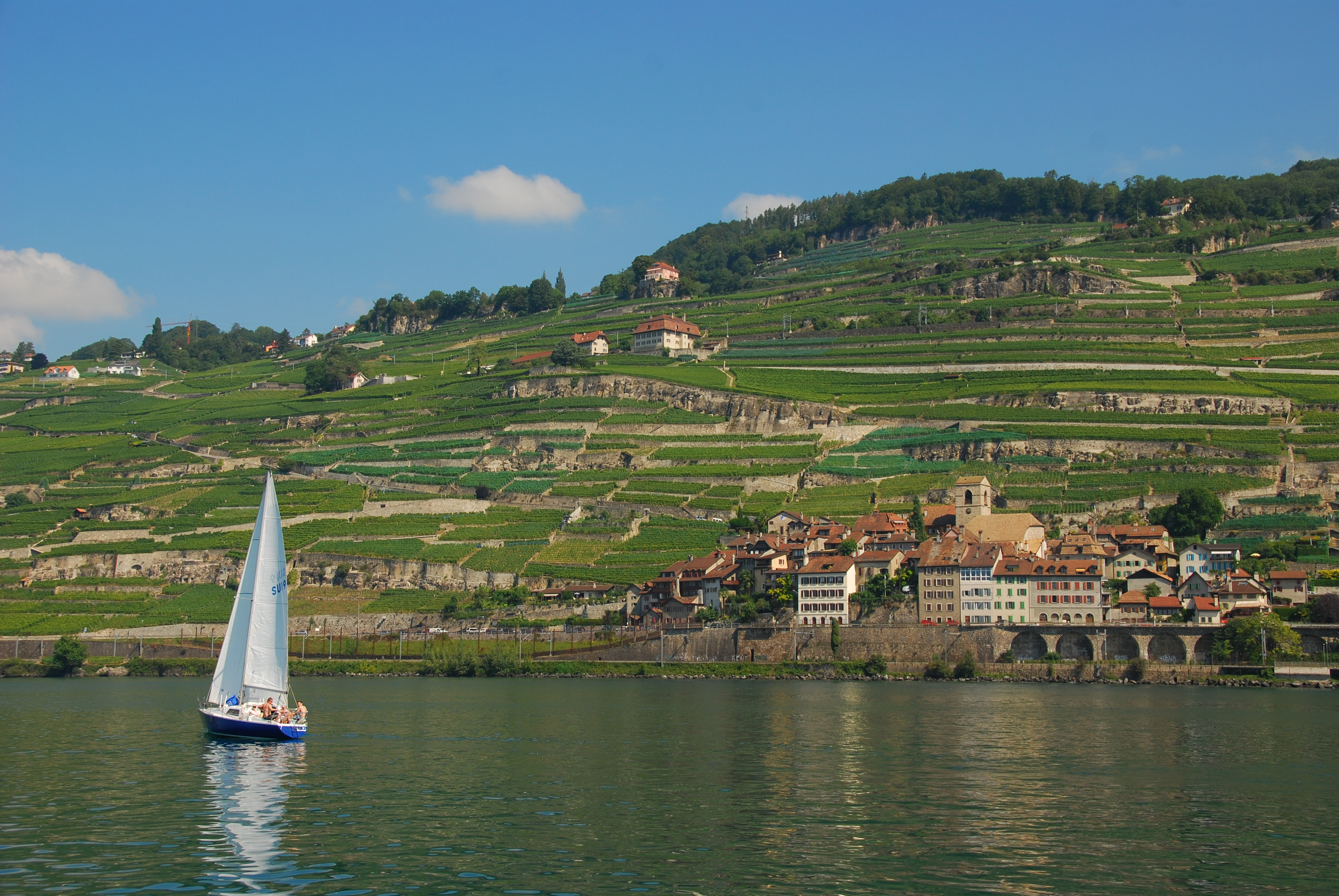
Lavaux vineyards at Saint-Saphorin

"The Lavaux vineyard landscape demonstrates in a highly visible way its evolution and development over almost a millennium, through the well preserved landscape and buildings that demonstrate a continuation and evolution of longstanding cultural traditions, specific to its locality."

=== Kuk Early Agricultural Site (2008) ===
Kuk Early Agricultural Site (Kuk Swamp) is located in the western highlands of Papua New Guinea, at 1500m and covering 116ha. Kuk is one of the few places in the world where archaeological evidence suggests independent agricultural development, with the wetlands preserving archaeological evidence of agricultural practices stretch back 10000 years.

=== West Lake Cultural Landscape of Hangzhou, China (2011) ===
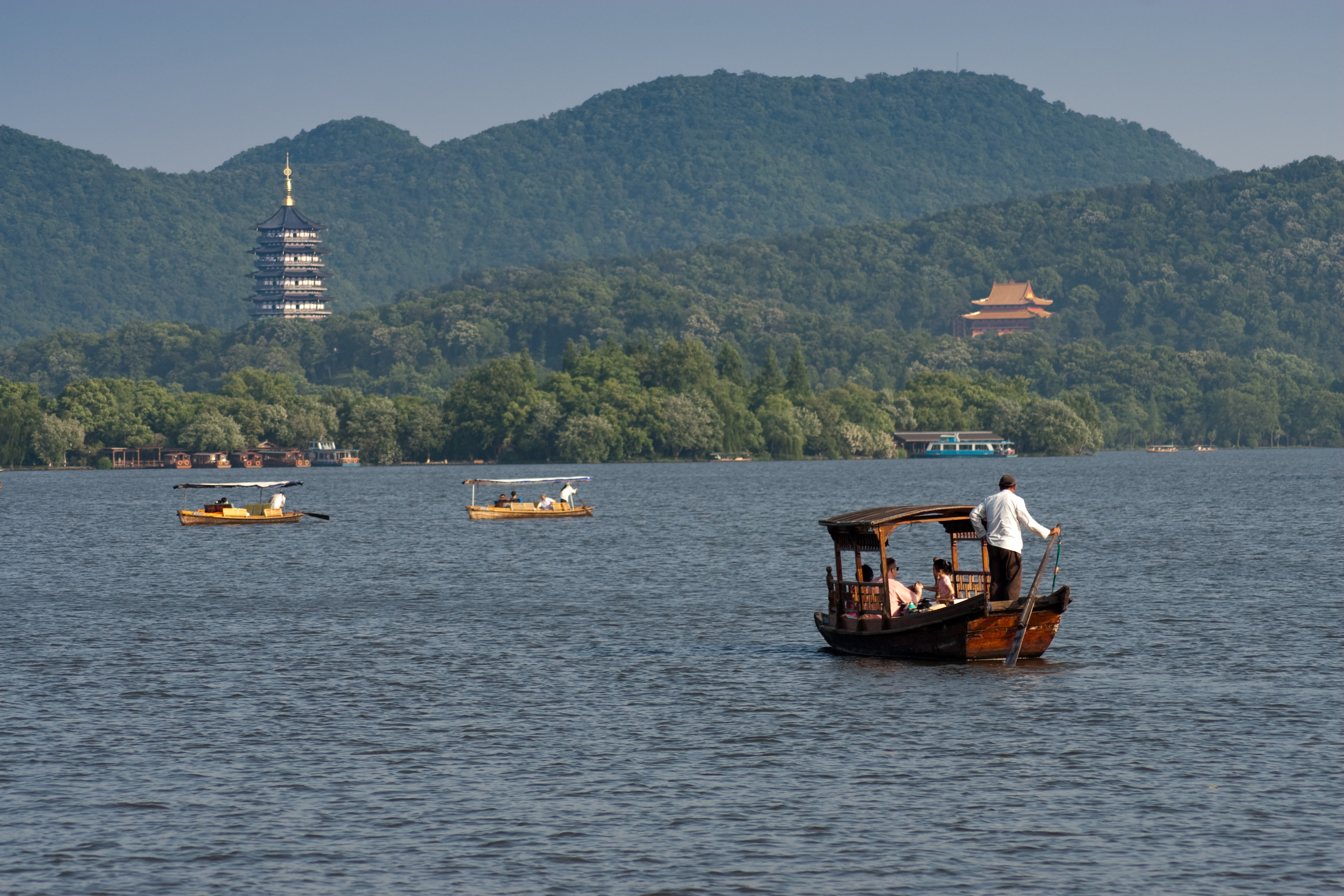
The West Lake of Hangzhou World Heritage Site. According to the UNESCO, it reflects "an idealized fusion between humans and nature."

"The West Lake Cultural Landscape of Hangzhou, comprising the West Lake and the hills surrounding its three sides, has inspired famous poets, scholars and artists since the 9th century. It comprises numerous temples, pagodas, pavilions, gardens and ornamental trees, as well as causeways and artificial islands."

=== Qhapaq Ñan (Inca Road System), Northwestern Argentina, South Colombia, Ecuador, Bolivia, Peru, Chile (2014) ===
Qhapaq Ñan is an extensive Inca communication, trade and defense network of roads covering 30,000 km (19,000 mi). Constructed by the Incas over several centuries and partly based on pre-Inca infrastructure, this extraordinary network through one of the world's most extreme geographical terrains linked the snow-capped peaks of the Andes – at an altitude of more than 6,000 m (20,000 ft) – to the coast, running through hot rainforests, fertile valleys, and absolute deserts. It reached its maximum expansion in the 15th century when it spread across the length and breadth of the Andes.

The Qhapac Ñan, Andean Road System includes 273 component sites spread over more than 6,000 km (3,700 mi) that were selected to highlight the social, political, architectural and engineering achievements of the network, along with its associated infrastructure for trade, accommodation, and storage, as well as sites of religious significance.

== See also ==
- Cultural area
- Cultural geography
- Cultural region
- Ecomuseum
- Historic American Landscapes Survey
- Landscape architecture
- Lists of World Heritage Sites
- Native American use of fire
- Natural landscape
- Social space

== Bibliography ==
- Conzen, M., 1993, 'The historical impulse in Geographical writing about the United States 1850 1990', in Conzen, M., Rumney, T. and Wynn, G., A Scholar's Guide to Geographical Writing on the American and Canadian Past, The University of Chicago Press, Chicago, pp. 3 90.
- Denevan William M., 1992, 'The Americas before and after 1492: Current Geographical Research', Annals of the Association of American Geographers, Vol. 82, No. 3, pp. 369–385.
- Elkins, T. H., 1989, 'Human and Regional Geography in the German-speaking lands in the first forty years of the Twentieth Century', in J. Nicholas Entrikin & Stanley D. Brunn (eds). Reflections on Richard Hartshorne's The nature of geography, Occasional publications of the Association of the American Geographers, Washington DC. 17-34.
- James, P. E. and Martin, G., 1981, All Possible Worlds: A history of geographical ideas, John Wiley & Sons, New York
- Jones, M., 2003, 'The Concept of Cultural Landscape: Discourse and Narratives', in H. Palang & G. Fry (eds.), Landscape Interfaces. Cultural Heritage in Changing Landscapes, Dordrecht, 21-51
- Sauer, C., 1925, The Morphology of Landscape, University of California Publications in Geography, 22:19-53.
- Fedorov, Roman (2013). "Genesis of the Cultural Landscape of Urals and Siberia". Journal of Eurasian Studies. 4 (2): 207–216. doi:10.1016/j.euras.2013.03.010.
