= Jalen Mayfield =

American football player (born 2000)

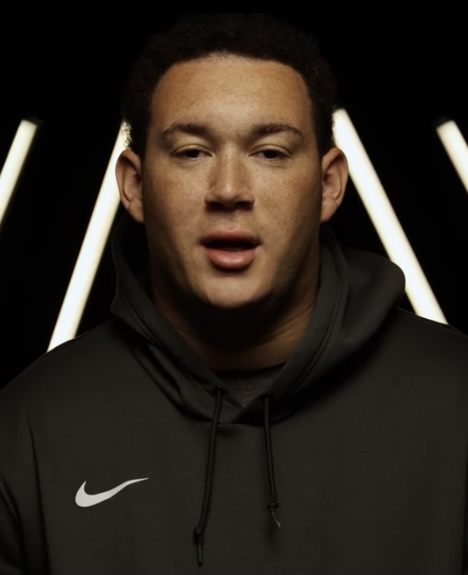
- Mayfield in 2021

Profile
- Position: Guard

Personal information
- Born: May 23, 2000 (age 26); Grand Rapids, Michigan, U.S.
- Listed height: 6 ft 5 in (1.96 m)
- Listed weight: 320 lb (145 kg)

Career information
- High school: Catholic Central (Grand Rapids)
- College: Michigan (2018–2020)
- NFL draft: 2021: 3rd round, 68th overall pick

Career history
- Atlanta Falcons (2021–2022); New York Giants (2023)

Career NFL statistics as of 2023
- Games played: 19
- Games started: 16
- Stats at Pro Football Reference

Jalen Mayfield (born May 23, 2000) is an American professional football guard. He played college football for the Michigan Wolverines, and was selected by the Atlanta Falcons in the third round of the 2021 NFL draft.

== Early life ==
Mayfield grew up in Grand Rapids, Michigan, and attended Catholic Central High School, where he was a four year starter at offensive tackle and defensive end for the football team. Mayfield originally committed to play college football at Minnesota in February of this junior year, but eventually flipped his commitment to Michigan three months later. As a senior, he was named The Grand Rapids Press Defensive Player of the Year after recording 96 tackles, 31 tackles for loss, 17 sacks, and 3 fumble recoveries and played in the U.S. Army All-American Bowl.

== College career ==
Mayfield played in three games at left tackle as a true freshman. He was named the Wolverines' starting right tackle going into his sophomore year and was named honorable mention All-Big Ten Conference after starting all 13 of Michigan's games. Following the 2020 season, Mayfield announced that he would forgo his remaining years of college eligibility and enter the 2021 NFL draft.

== Professional career ==
Pre-draft measurables
Height	Weight	Arm length	Hand span	40-yard dash	10-yard split	20-yard split	20-yard shuttle	Three-cone drill	Vertical jump	Broad jump
6 ft 5 1/4 in (1.96 m)	326 lb (148 kg)	32 5/8 in (0.83 m)	9 3/4 in (0.25 m)	5.38 s	1.81 s	3.03 s	4.91 s	7.86 s	28.5 in (0.72 m)	8 ft 0 in (2.44 m)
All values from Pro Day

=== Atlanta Falcons ===
==== 2021 season ====
Mayfield was selected by the Atlanta Falcons in the third round (68th overall) of the 2021 NFL draft. He signed his four-year rookie contract with Atlanta on June 15, 2021.

Heading into his first NFL training camp, Mayfield competed with Kaleb McGary to be the Falcons' starting right tackle. Due to injuries suffered by offensive guards Josh Andrews and Matt Gono, however, Mayfield began taking first-team reps at left guard. At the conclusion of the NFL preseason, Mayfield was named the starting left guard for the Falcons.

Mayfield made his first career start and NFL debut in the Falcons' Week 1 loss to the Philadelphia Eagles, playing in 90% of the team's offensive snaps After this game, he would appear in every single offensive snap for the Falcons until Week 17, when an injury suffered late in the fourth quarter of the Falcons' loss to the Buffalo Bills kept him out of the Falcons' Week 18 season finale against the New Orleans Saints.

Overall, Mayfield finished his rookie season appearing in 16 games and starts.

==== 2022 season ====
On September 1, 2022, Mayfield was placed on injured reserve. He missed the entire 2022 season.

Mayfield was released on August 26, 2023.

=== New York Giants ===
Mayfield was signed to the practice squad of the New York Giants on August 31, 2023. He was promoted to the active roster on October 14. He was released on October 16 and re-signed to the practice squad. Following the end of the 2023 regular season, the Giants signed him to a reserve/future contract on January 8, 2024. He was waived on August 27, 2024.
