= Catholic Central High School (Grand Rapids, Michigan) =

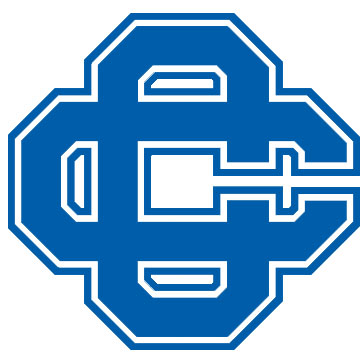

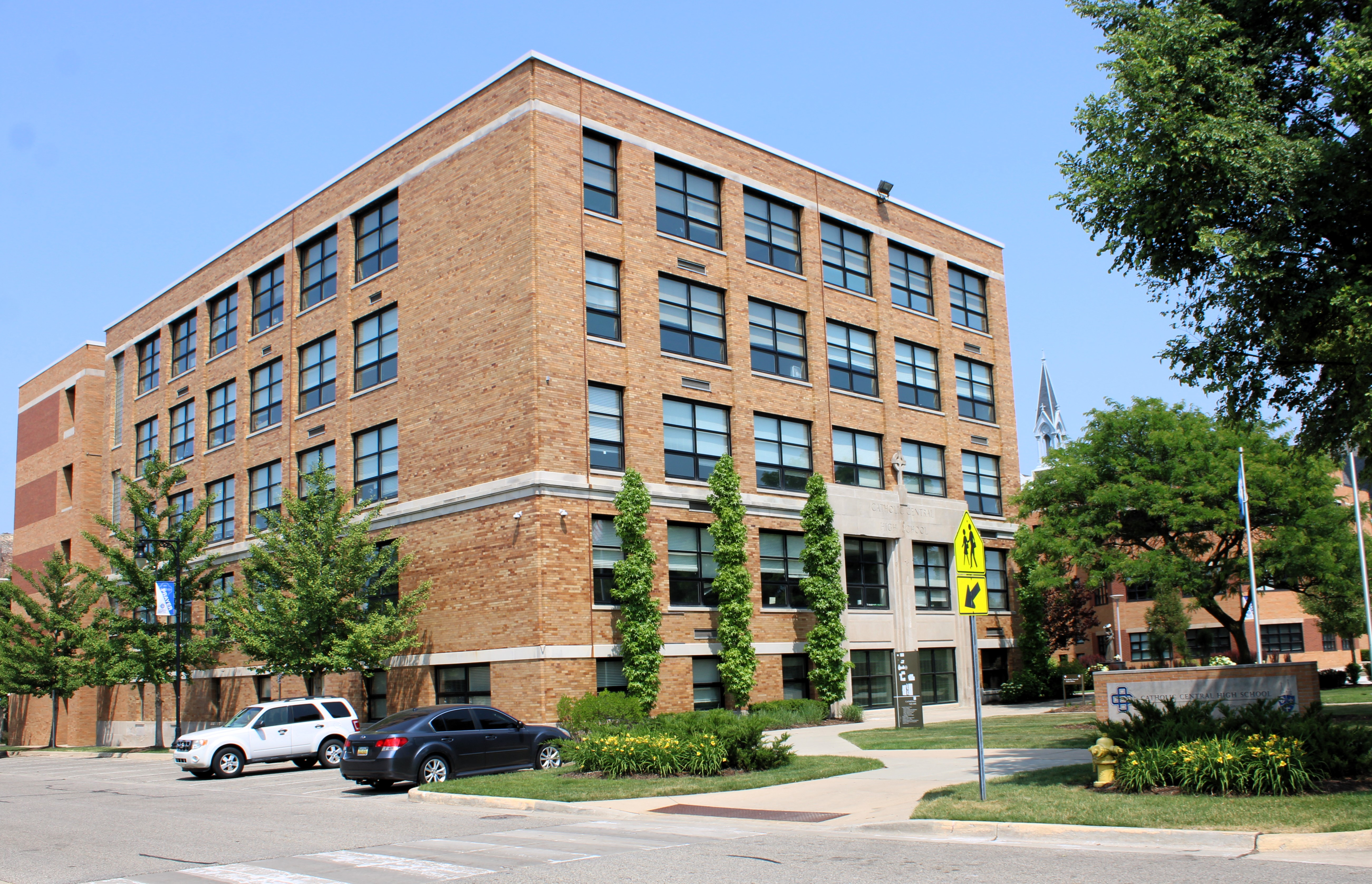

Location
- 319 Sheldon Boulevard SE; Grand Rapids, Michigan 49503; United States; 42°57′24″N 85°40′2″W

Information
- Type: Private
- Religious affiliation: Roman Catholic
- Oversight: Diocese of Grand Rapids
- Superintendent: Sarah Grey
- President: Greg Deja
- Principal: Abby Kanitz
- Teaching staff: 39.4
- Grades: 9–12
- Enrollment: 552
- Student to teacher ratio: 16.2
- Colors: Royal blue and white
- Athletics conference: Ottawa-Kent Conference
- Nickname: Cougars
- Website: www.grcatholiccentral.org
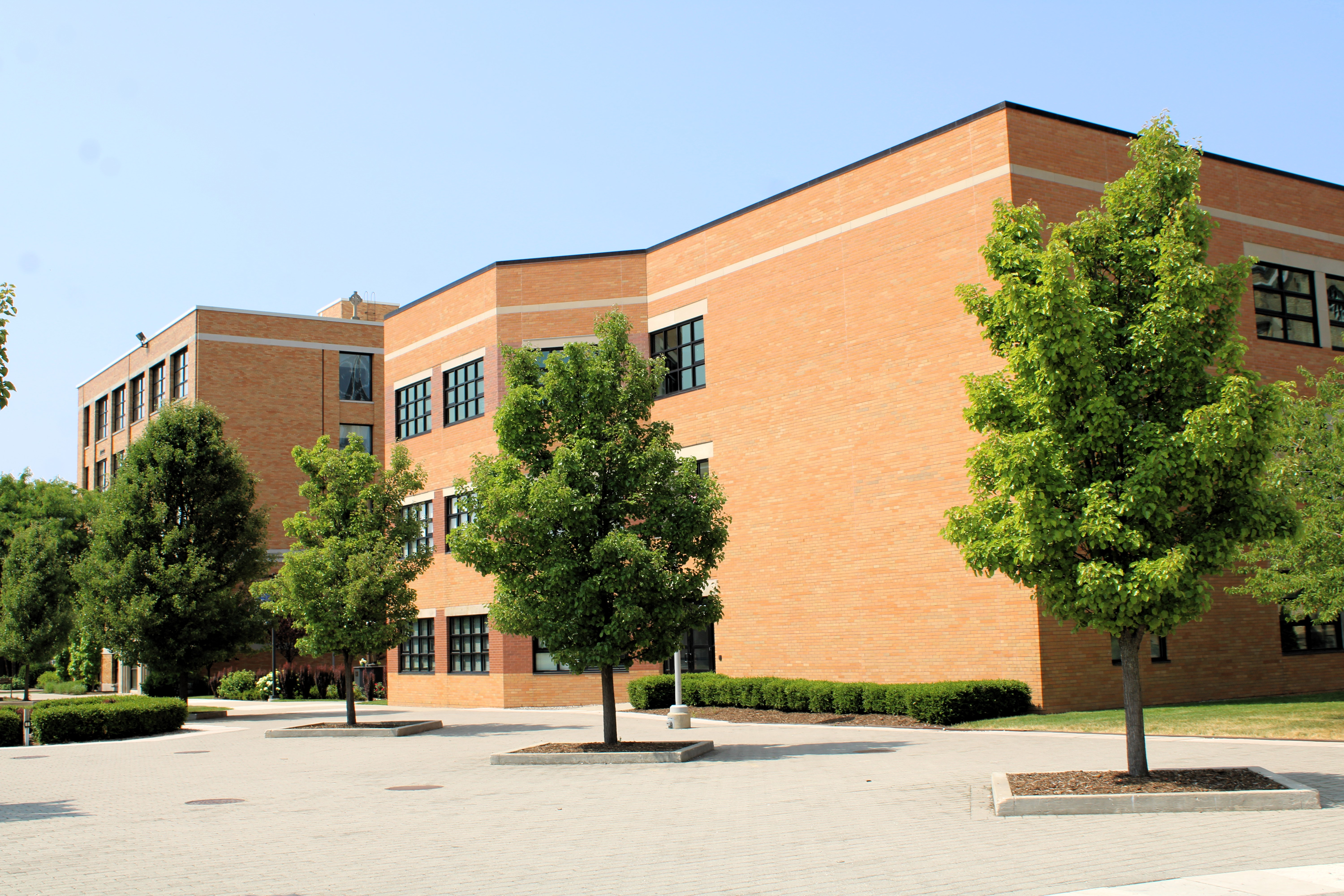

Catholic Central High School is a college preparatory high school in Grand Rapids, Michigan.

== Athletics ==
Catholic Central High School's "Cougars" compete in the Ottawa-Kent Conference. School colors are royal blue and white. The following Michigan High School Athletic Association (MHSAA) sanctioned sports are offered:

- Baseball (boys)
- Basketball (girls and boys)
- Bowling (girls and boys)
- Competitive cheerleading (girls)
- Cross country (girls and boys)
- Football (boys)
- Golf (girls and boys)
- Ice hockey (boys)
- Lacrosse (girls and boys)
- Skiing (girls and boys)
- Soccer (girls and boys)
- Softball (girls)
- Swim and dive (girls and boys)
- Tennis (girls and boys)
- Track and field (girls and boys)
- Volleyball (girls)
- Wrestling (boys)

== Notable alumni ==
- Vince Agnew, football player
- George Andrie, football player Dallas Cowboys
- Owen Bieber, president, United Auto Workers
- Marcus Bingham Jr. (born 2000), basketball player for Hapoel Haifa of the Israeli Basketball Premier League
- Brandon Dillon, chairman of the Michigan Democratic Party
- Obi Ezeh, football player University of Michigan
- Mike Kadish, football player Miami Dolphins
- Michael Keller, football player Dallas Cowboys
- Jalen Mayfield, football player, Atlanta Falcons
- Wally Pipp, baseball player, New York Yankees
- Joe Soboleski, football player
- Wm. Stage, journalist
