= Shell Oil Company "Spectacular" Sign =

Landmark in Cambridge, Massachusetts

- U.S. National Register of Historic Places
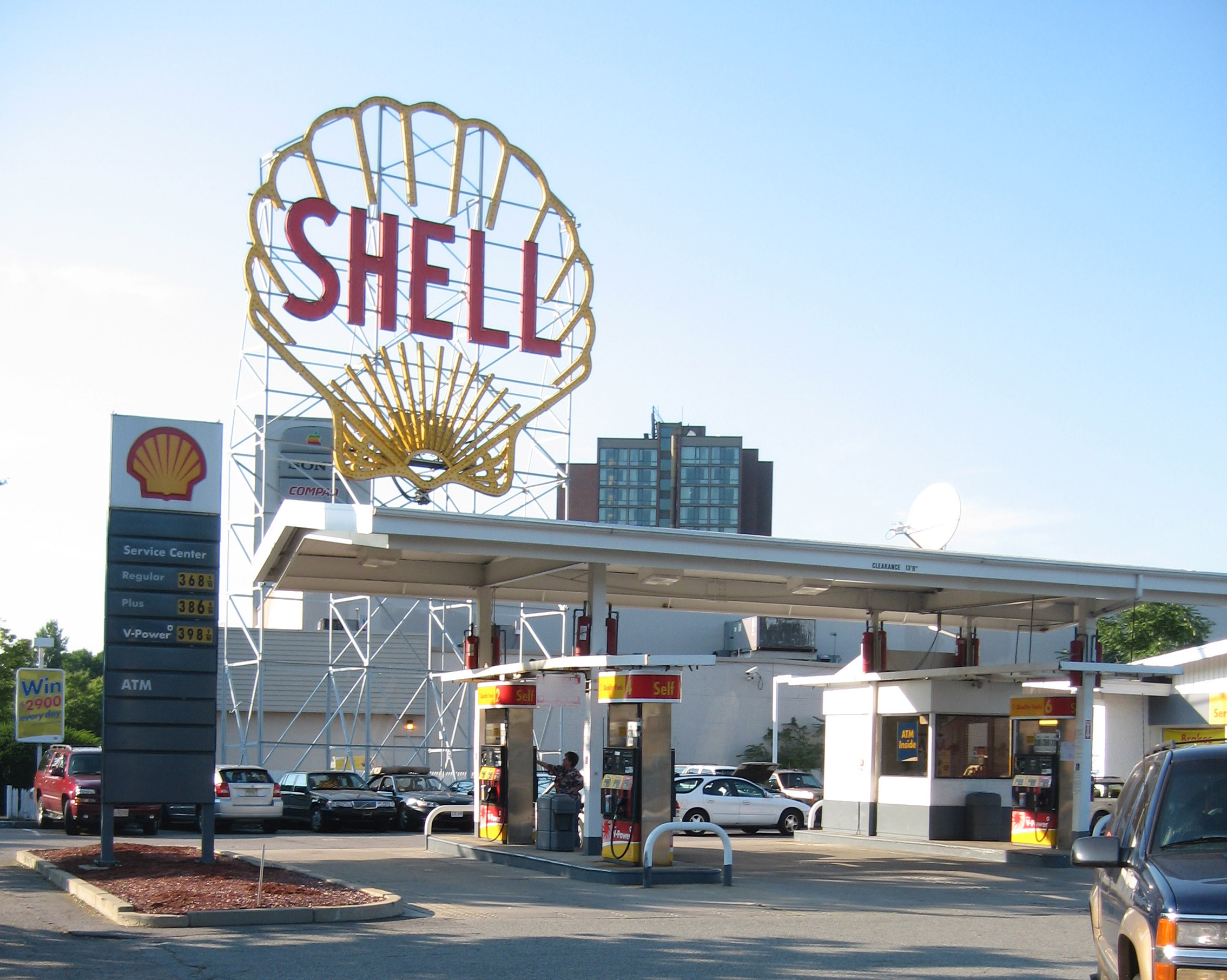
- The sign and filling station pictured in 2008

- Location within Massachusetts Location within the United States
- Location: Cambridge, Massachusetts, U.S.
- Coordinates: 42°21′24.5″N 71°06′51.9″W
- Built: 1933; 93 years ago
- Architect: Donnelly Electric Manufacturing Co.
- Architectural style: Moderne
- NRHP reference No.: 94000546
- Added to NRHP: June 3, 1994

The Shell Oil Company "Spectacular" Sign is a historic advertising sign by the Shell USA (the US-based subsidiary of Shell plc) located at 187 Magazine Street in Cambridge, Massachusetts.

== History ==
The Shell USA sign was built in a Moderne style in 1933 by Donnelly Electric Manufacturing Company, and was originally located on the Shell Company building in Boston on Commonwealth Avenue, which now houses Boston University Academy.

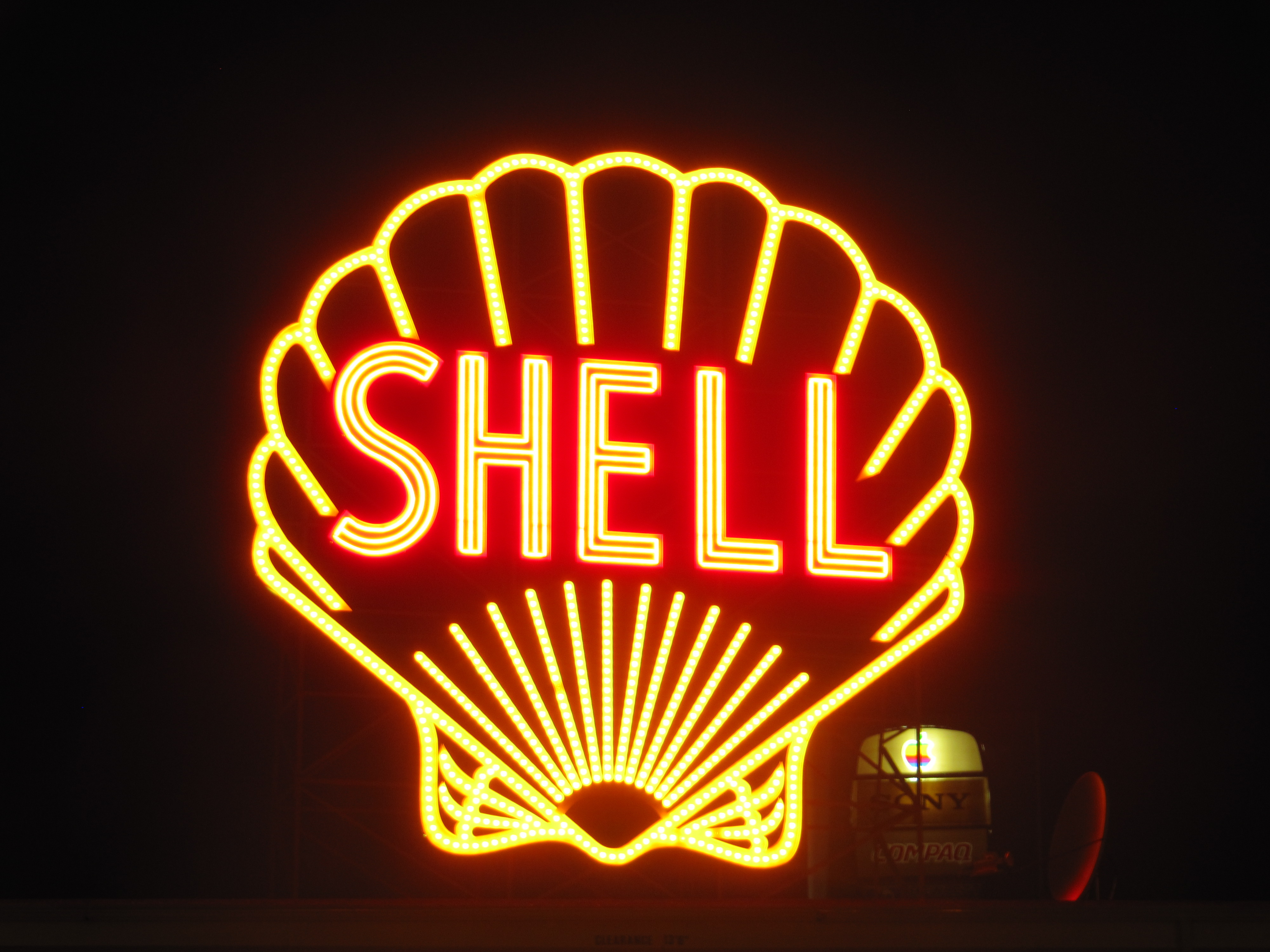
Night view of the sign

It was moved to its present site adjacent to Memorial Drive in 1944. It is, along with the Citgo sign in Boston, one of only two surviving advertising signs of its type in the area. Although the regular station signage is updated to reflect the company's current logo, the "Spectacular" sign itself also remains in the same location where it has always been.

The sign was added to the National Register of Historic Places in 1994.

== See also ==
- National Register of Historic Places listings in Cambridge, Massachusetts
- Commonwealth Avenue (Boston)
