= Society for Commercial Archeology =

The Society for Commercial Archeology (SCA) is an American organization that is the oldest national organization devoted to the study of buildings, artifacts, structures, signs, and symbols of the 20th-century Commercial culture. It was founded in 1977. The SCA activities include publications, conferences, and tours to help preserve, document, architecture of the 20th century, including diners, highways, gas stations, drive-in theaters, bus stations, tourist courts, neon signs. One of the organization's early successes was the 1983 restoration, to working order, of the Boston Citgo sign, an effort led by SCA member Arthur Krim.
