= Vince Agnew =

American gridiron football player (born 1987)

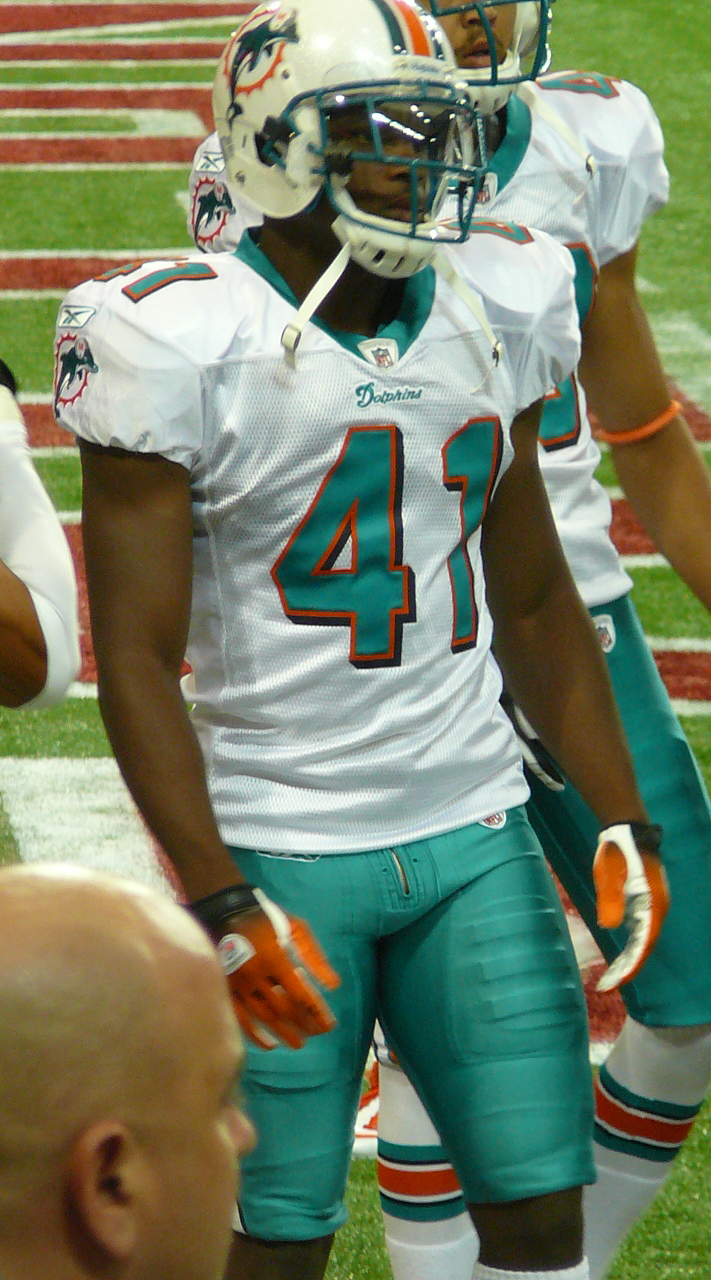
- Agnew with the Miami Dolphins in 2011

No. 41, 23
- Position: Cornerback

Personal information
- Born: December 28, 1987 (age 38); Grand Rapids, Michigan, U.S.
- Listed height: 5 ft 10 in (1.78 m)
- Listed weight: 192 lb (87 kg)

Career information
- High school: Grand Rapids (MI) Catholic Central
- College: Central Michigan (2007–2010)
- NFL draft: 2011: undrafted

Career history
- Miami Dolphins (2011)*; Winnipeg Blue Bombers (2012)*; Dallas Cowboys (2012); Kansas City Chiefs (2013)*; Toronto Argonauts (2014–2015)
- * Offseason or practice squad member only

Awards and highlights
- Third-team All-MAC (2010)
- Stats at Pro Football Reference
- Stats at CFL.ca

Vincent Shonte Agnew (born December 28, 1987) is an American former professional football cornerback. He played college football at Central Michigan University. He was a member of the Miami Dolphins, Winnipeg Blue Bombers, Dallas Cowboys, Kansas City Chiefs and Toronto Argonauts.

== Early life ==
Agnew played high school football at Catholic Central High School in Grand Rapids, Michigan. He was a three-year starter and letterman as a cornerback and wide receiver. He also spent time at running back. He earned first-team all-state first-team honors his senior year after totaling 1,425 all-purpose yards, thirteen touchdowns and eleven interceptions. Catholic Central had a 12–2 record his senior season in 2005 and finished as the runner-up in the state. Agnew was also a four-year letterman in varsity track and field, setting the school record in the 100 and in long jump. He also lettered twice in basketball.

== College career ==
Agnew played in 47 games for the Central Michigan Chippewas from 2007 to 2010, recording 161 tackles, five tackles for loss, one interception, 14 passes defensed, one forced fumble, one fumble recovery and three blocked kicks. He garnered Third-team All-MAC accolades his senior year. He redshirted in 2006. Agnew majored in journalism at Central Michigan.

== Professional career ==
Agnew was rated the 35th best cornerback in the 2011 NFL draft by NFLDraftScout.com.

Pre-draft measurables
Height	Weight	40-yard dash	10-yard split	20-yard split	20-yard shuttle	Three-cone drill	Vertical jump	Broad jump	Bench press
5 ft 10 in (1.78 m)	192 lb (87 kg)	4.38 s	1.50 s	2.53 s	4.18 s	6.68 s	39 1/2 in (1.00 m)	11 ft 2 in (3.40 m)	14 reps
All values from Central Michigan Pro Day

Agnew signed with the Miami Dolphins on July 28, 2011, after going undrafted in the 2011 NFL Draft. He was released by the Dolphins on September 3 and signed to the team's practice squad on September 4, 2011. He was released by the Dolphins on September 14 and re-signed to the team's practice squad on October 5, 2011. Agnew was released by the Dolphins on October 25 and signed to the team's practice squad on November 8, 2011. He signed a future contract with the Dolphins on January 30, 2012. He was released by the team on August 31, 2012.

Agnew was signed to the Winnipeg Blue Bombers' practice roster on October 10, 2012. He was released by the Blue Bombers on October 14, 2012.

Agnew was signed to the Dallas Cowboys' practice squad on October 16, 2012. He was promoted to the active roster on November 10, 2012. He played in four games for the Cowboys during the 2012 season. Agnew was released by the Cowboys on December 11, 2012, and signed to the team's practice squad on December 13, 2012. He signed a future contract with the Cowboys on December 31, 2012. He was released by the team on March 4, 2013.

Agnew signed with the Kansas City Chiefs on June 6, 2013. He was released by the Chiefs on August 25, 2013.

Agnew was signed by the Toronto Argonauts on March 11, 2014. He played in sixteen games, starting ten, for the team in 2014. He recorded 31 defensive tackles, 14 special teams tackles and four sacks during the 2014 season. Agnew played in fourteen games for the Argonauts in 2015, accumulating 21 defensive tackles and eight special teams tackles.

== Personal life ==
Agnew held his first Swagnew Game Breakers Football Camp in July 2013.
