= Wm. Stage =

American journalist (born 1951)

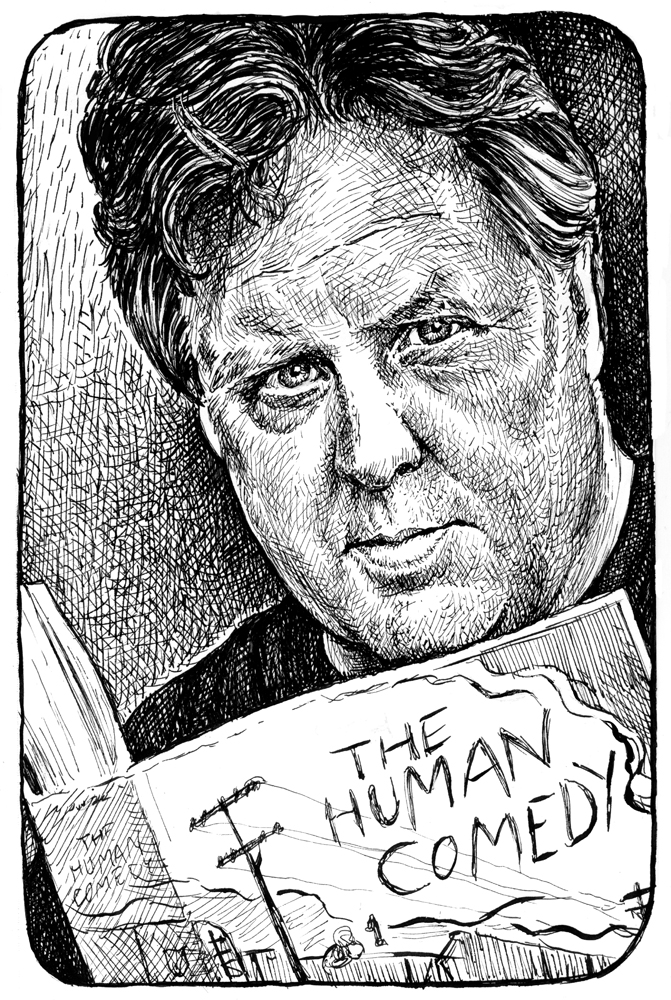
- 2011 drawing of Wm. Stage, by artist Ben Tegel
- Born: June 30, 1951 (age 75); Kalamazoo, Michigan
- Occupations: journalist, author, photographer
- Years active: 1989 - present
- Spouse: Mary
- Children: 7
- Website: wmstage.com

Wm. Stage, also known as William Stage (born June 30, 1951) is an American journalist, author, and photographer, with a focus on the area and history of the American Midwest and St. Louis, Missouri. From 1982 to 2004 he worked for the weekly newspaper The Riverfront Times, producing three columns, with the best known being Street Talk, where over the years he photographed and interviewed more than 8,500 random individuals about miscellaneous topics. He is also known for his documentary work on a special kind of historical outdoor advertising: vintage brick wall signs. As of 2025, he has authored 16 books, a combination of photography, non-fiction, and fiction. His photographs have appeared in multiple works, including the cover photograph on the Oxford University Press book, For the Common Good (2002). In 2001, Stage, who had been adopted as an infant, tracked down his biological family, a search which led to a Canadian television documentary and formed the basis for his 2009 memoir Fool for Life.

== Early life ==
Wm. Stage was born in Kalamazoo, Michigan to an unwed mother who immediately turned him over to the Catholic sisters of St. Agnes Foundling Home. At three months he was adopted and taken to Grand Rapids, the only child of Bill and Virginia Stage. In 1969, he graduated from Catholic Central High School, and soon enlisted in the U.S. Army, doing a tour in Germany as a medical corpsman / ambulance driver. While there he attended the University of Maryland Evening Division, studying English composition and German language. After his discharge he attended Grand Valley State College in Allendale, Michigan on the G.I. Bill; in 1976 he received a Bachelor of Philosophy degree.

=== Epidemiologist ===
In 1978, at the age of 26, while working as an ambulance driver in Grand Rapids, he was recruited by Atlanta's Centers For Disease Control and assigned to the St. Louis City Health Department as a public health officer. For five years he was charged with interviewing those infected with STDs, primarily gonorrhea and syphilis, identifying their sexual contacts, and ensuring that all were properly treated. His work involved identifying which diseases were in the population, and when/if other new diseases were appearing. It was during this period, the early 1980s, when HIV/AIDS first appeared, so Stage and his colleagues saw from a clinical perspective the damage done by this disease. This exposure became the basis for his novel, Creatures on Display (2015).

== Writing and publishing ==
While working as an epidemiologist with the St. Louis Health Department, he began freelancing as a feature writer for local periodicals, eventually leaving his position with the CDC to devote himself to journalism and photography.

By July 1982, Stage had been hired full-time with The Riverfront Times, a St. Louis-based alternative newsweekly which was founded by Ray Hartmann in 1977. He stayed with the paper until 2004, producing three different regular columns over a 22-year period, plus numerous magazine-style features. Have A Weird Day: Reflections and Ruminations on the St. Louis Experience, is a collection of expository writings that appeared in The Riverfront Times in a column entitled "Mississippi Mud".

From 2003 to 2013, he was a columnist with the St. Charles County [MO] Business Record. He has also taught feature writing at the Defense Information School, Fort Benjamin Harrison, Indiana; and photojournalism at Saint Louis University School for Professional Studies.

For three years [2005–2008] Stage and his pre-teen daughter Margaret E. Stage produced a monthly for-profit newspaper, Black White & Read All Over, which they distributed in the Lafayette Square neighborhood of St. Louis. In 2010, father and daughter collaborated again with the publication of The Painted Ad: A Postcard Book of Vintage Brick Wall Signs. This work followed the lead of his first book, Ghost Signs: Brick Wall Signs in America, which was the first commercially produced and distributed book on the subject. The authorship of Ghost Signs earned Stage a seat on the board of The Society For Commercial Archeology, at the time based in the Smithsonian Institution and later based in Madison, Wisconsin.

Stage founded two publishing companies. Cumquat Publishing Company, which wholesales art and novelty postcards to bookstores and museum gift shops, while Floppinfish Publishing Company Ltd. is a small-scale book publisher.

In 2001, at the age of 50, Stage found his natural family, first making contact with his biological mother and her children, and later making contact with the offspring of his late biological father. His lifelong identity as an only child was suddenly altered; he now had a "new family," a second set of relatives including a mother, seven half-brothers and sisters as well as numerous aunts and cousins scattered throughout the eastern United States and Nova Scotia. In 2004, Stage was the subject of an episode of "Past Lives," a documentary-style show on Canadian TV that focuses on people in search of their roots. The half-hour program, filmed on Cape Breton Island, ran Canada-wide and was seen in re-runs for four years. These events were humorously chronicled in a December 2003 cover story in The Riverfront Times and formed the core of Stage's comic memoir Fool For Life. Five years in the writing, Fool was well received by both the reading public and critics alike and bolstered Stage's reputation as a prose humorist.

In 2007, Stage began voicing guest commentaries on KWMU-FM, the NPR affiliate in St. Louis. Topics ranged from the folly of Daylight Saving Time to the joys of ice skating.

In 2010, Stage's prose turned from creative nonfiction to fiction. The next 14 years saw a collection of short stories such as "Not Waving Drowning" (2011), followed by five novels. The first, Creatures on Display (2015), is a comic noir look at an in-the-trenches band of investigators trying to get a handle on a mysterious malady plaguing the St. Louis social scene in the early 1980s. It is based on his experience as an STD epidemiologist during his years of working for the CDC.

No Big Thing (2018) is an historical novel based on the Ku Klux Klan’s bid to join Missouri’s Adopt-A-Highway program, being rejected, and having the case go to the Missouri Supreme Court.

Stage also delved into crime fiction, penning three novels featuring Francis X. Lenihan, an intrepid St. Louis process server and his pals from Murphy's Bar: St. Francis Of Dogtown (2019), A Friend of King Neptune (2023), and Down And Out in the River City (2025). The second novel, A Friend of King Neptune (2023), took first prize in 2023 in the adult fiction category of the Indie Author Project, and was featured in the Library Journal December 2023 Issue, “Best Books". In a 2020 Reader’s Poll from STL Today, St. Francis of Dogtown took first in the category "Favorite New Book by a St. Louis Author," and Stage himself won in the category "Favorite Current Louis Author".

== Photography ==
As of 2024, Stage has authored five books on photography, largely falling into the genre of street photography. While doing a popular column for The Riverfront Times, "Street Talk," Stage posed quirky or philosophical man-on-the-street questions to unwitting subjects, of whom he also obtained a photo. Overall, he captured more than 8,500 faces on film, featuring people from every walk of life, including celebrities and notables such as Robert Mapplethorpe, Dick Gregory, Jimmy Carter, Kurt Vonnegut, Ken Kesey, Queen Ida, Sir Edmund Hillary, and Jerry Seinfeld. A select collection of those portraits became a book, Pictures of People. Some of his photos have been widely exhibited and purchased for inclusion in various private collections.

Stage is a 1995 alumnus of the week-long Missouri Photo Workshop, founded in 1949 by the “Father of Photojournalism” Cliff Edom and offered by the Missouri School of Journalism housed in the University of Missouri – Columbia. The workshop is held in a different Missouri town each year; Stage did his stint in Trenton, northwestern Missouri.

Starting in the mid-1970s, Stage began documenting a particular form of outdoor advertising found in cities and towns across the country, where signs were painted on walls of brick buildings, and then faded over the years. Some of these wall signs, dating back to the 1800s, have become known as ghost signs. This led to Ghost Signs: Brick Wall Signs in America (1989), the first commercial book on the subject. Two more books on the same topic followed, including Fading Ads of St. Louis (2013).

In 2014, a retrospective, William Stage: Photographs and Assemblages, was exhibited at the Sheldon Concert Hall & Art Galleries in St. Louis.

== Personal ==
Wm. Stage lives in St. Louis with his wife, Mary, and five of their daughters. He has been a special process server since 1998.

== Works ==
As of 2024, Stage has authored 16 books, a combination of photography, fiction, and non-fiction.

=== Photographic ===
- Ghost Signs: Brick Wall Signs in America [1998]
- Pictures Of People [2006]
- The Painted Ad: A Postcard Book of Vintage Brick Wall Signs [2011] with Margaret Stage
- Fading Ads of St. Louis [2013]
- Welcome To Old Ripley / I was Looking For A Bar [2021]

=== Nonfiction ===
- Mound City Chronicles. Floppinfish Pub Co. 1991. ISBN 978-0-9629124-0-5.
- Litchfield: A strange and twisted saga of murder in the Midwest. Floppinfish Pub Co. 1998. ISBN 978-0-9629124-1-2.
- Have A Weird Day: Reflections and Ruminations on the St. Louis Experience. St. Louis: Floppinfish Pub. Co. 2003. ISBN 978-0962912436.
- The Practical Guide To Process Serving (3rd ed.). Birkenfeld Press. 2007. ISBN 978-0615702032.

=== Fiction / memoir ===
- Fool For Life [2009]
- Not Waving, Drowning [2012]
- Creatures On Display – A Novel [2015]
- No Big Thing – A Novel [2017]
- St. Francis Of Dogtown – A Novel [2019]
- A Friend Of King Neptune — A Novel [2023]
- Down And Out In The River City — A Novel [2025]

=== As contributor ===
- Photographs appear in St. Louis: Home On The River – Urban Tapestry Series – Towery Publishing Inc., 1995
- Photographs appear in St. Louis: For The Record – Urban Tapestry Series – Towery Publishing Inc., 1999
- Cover photograph "Three Of A Kind" appears on For the Common Good? American Civic Life and the Golden Age of Fraternity – Jason Kaufman, author – Oxford University Press Inc. 2002
- Photographs appear in Outhouses – Holly L. Bollinger, author – MBI Publishing Company, 2005
- Photographs appear in St. Louis Seen & Unseen – Michael Kilfoy, author – Virginia Publishing, 2006
- Introduction to Fading Ads of New York City – Frank Jump, author – The History Press, 2011
- Photograph “Harvey’s Sandwich System, St. Louis, Missouri 1979” chosen as cover image of Lire de materialisme, Charles T. Wolfe, author. ENS Editions, Paris, France, 2020
