= J. B. Jackson =

American writer, publisher, instructor, and sketch artist in landscape design

Brinck Jackson
- Born: September 25, 1909; Dinard, France
- Died: August 29, 1996 (aged 86); Santa Fe, New Mexico
- Education: Institut Le Rosey
- Alma mater: University of Wisconsin–Madison; Harvard University
- Occupations: Writer, publisher, instructor, and sketch artist

John Brinckerhoff "Brinck" Jackson (September 25, 1909 – August 29, 1996) was a writer, publisher, instructor, and sketch artist in landscape design. Herbert Muschamp, architecture critic of the New York Times, stated that J. B. Jackson was "America's greatest living writer on the forces that have shaped the land this nation occupies." He was influential in broadening the perspective on the "vernacular" landscape.

== Early life ==
Brinck was born on September 25, 1909, in Dinard, France to American parents. Jackson spent his early school years with them in Washington, D.C., and in Europe. In 1923, at age 14, he was enrolled at the elite Institut Le Rosey in Rolle, Switzerland, where he became fluent in both French and German. He savored an environment of mountains, meadows, and forests, but also absorbed the human face of the Swiss cities and cantons. He would later draw upon his travels abroad in writings, sketches, and watercolors. He attended Eaglebrook School, Choate, and Deerfield Academy in New England and spent summers on his uncle's farm in New Mexico.

Jackson's experiences in college were influential in his approach to the shaping of the landscape. He attended the Experimental College of the University of Wisconsin–Madison. Jackson gained an insight into architecture and planning from the social criticism of Lewis Mumford and Oswald Spengler's revelation in Decline of the West that "landscapes reflected the culture of the people that were living there."

In 1929, Jackson entered Harvard. His instructor Irving Babbitt was influential in Jackson's opposition to modernism. Jackson's taste for Baroque style and history began to blossom at this time. He believed that the zest of the Baroque style was the essence of the connection between humankind and nature. While attending Harvard, Jackson wrote articles for the Harvard Advocate. His career of writing about the landscape began here.

== Career ==
Following graduation from Harvard in 1932, Jackson took courses in architecture, writing, and drawing. Each would later serve as the bases for essays, lectures, and articles for his magazine, Landscape. He wandered through Europe in 1934 to 1935 studying Baroque style. While in Europe, Jackson began to write articles critical of Nazism and published them in The American Review and Harper's. His interest in politics began to be expressed in his works. During the mid-1930s, Jackson published essays in American literary magazines and a novel, with his photograph that appeared on the cover of a 1938 ‘Saturday Review’. In 1938, his novel, titled Saints in Summertime, was published. The book revealed the infiltration of Nazism and the soldiers' attraction to energy emanating from power.

=== Military service ===
After briefly trying his hand at ranching in New Mexico, Jackson enlisted in the army, in 1940. As an officer during war, he studied books to gain insight on the geography of the location. He deciphered code, studied maps, and learned the terrain. He read books by French geographers—Pierre Deffontaines, Paul Vidal de la Blache, and Albert Demangeon. He was a part of the Ritchie Boys and his language skills were used to serve the United States Army in understanding issues on the European front. It was at this time that he developed his interpretation that the shaping and devastation of the landscape came from the necessities for human existence. Jackson believed that human history brought about human geography. The landscape was the product of humankind's effort to "recreate heaven on earth". As the war ended, Jackson began to contemplate publishing a magazine of geography.

=== Landscape magazine ===
In the spring of 1951, he published the first issue of Landscape, with the subtitle "Human Geography of the Southwest;" this was later dropped. Jackson served as the magazine's publisher and editor until 1968. At first, Jackson argued, quite literally, for a lofty – an airborne – view of the world, reveling in the perspective of aerial photographs. But Jackson's work, which dominated the first five issues of the magazine, was grounded in what he would later call the vernacular: an interest in the commonplace or everyday landscape. Jackson expressed an innate confidence in the ability of people of small means to make significant changes in their surroundings. In an opening essay, The Need of Being Versed in Country Things, Jackson states that "It is from the air that the true relationship between the natural and the human landscape is first clearly revealed. The peaks and canyons lose much of their impressiveness when seen from above. What catches our eye and arouses our interest is not the sandy washes and the naked rocks, but the evidences of man." His writings allowed him to raise questions and present controversial statements especially in reference to humans and their role in shaping the landscape.

Jackson's collected essays have been published in seven books, in addition to A Sense of Place, a Sense of Time, which won the 1995 PEN prize for essays.

=== Teaching ===
Jackson was influential in the lives of many students, colleagues, admirers, and friends. He taught landscape history courses as adjunct professor at Harvard University's Graduate School of Design beginning in 1969 and at the College of Environmental Design and the Department of Geography at the University of California, Berkeley. He ended teaching classes in the late 1970s. Since then he has given lectures, especially on themes pertaining to urban issues. Jackson states that "We are not spectators; all human landscape is not a work of art." He felt strongly that the purpose of landscape is to provide a place for living and working and leisure.

The Association of American Geographers established a Jackson Prize, to "reward American geographers who write books about the United States which convey the insights of professional geography in language that is interesting and attractive to a lay audience."

=== Cultural Landscapes Studies ===
As a scholar, historian and writer, John B. Jackson greatly influenced the development and trajectory of contemporary cultural landscape studies in America. In the introduction to Everyday America: Cultural Landscape Studies after J.B. Jackson (2003), editors Chris Wilson and Paul Groth note that the term 'cultural landscape' rarely appeared in print prior to the 1950s. But between 1959 and 1990, they note, writers across disciplines have come to realize the importance of the built environment.

"More surprising," they claim, "was the discovery of everyday built spaces as significant evidence of social groups, power relations and culture by historians, American studies scholars, literary critics, and a growing number of anthropologists, sociologists and social theorists." It is a "way of thinking," they continue, with "inherent contradictions and multiple approaches."

The history of landscape study and, more broadly, place and regional studies, illustrates the convergences with some of the histories here, both across discipline and nation.

In the United States a popular fascination with vibrant architecture, communities, and landscapes of everyday America has been expressed by writers ranging from Walt Whitman to Mark Twain, and by painter Winslow Homer through early-twentieth artists of common landscapes. The New Deal writers and painters explored a strong regionalist theme, which was also connected to the architectural and urban criticism of Lewis Mumford. The concern for environmental degradation caused by human activities was another American theme, spurred particularly by the Vermont writer George Perkins Marsh.

Comparison of American trends to cultural landscape studies in other places is illuminating. Wilson and Groth write that German cultural landscape studies were primarily based on scientific categorizations of regions and settlements, with strong cross-disciplinary ties to geology and economic analysis. Historical accounts of landscape influenced British cultural studies, but the study of cultural landscapes also was strongly based on field observation and map interpretations. In France, the emphasis on unique culture and geography shaped the field, especially in ideas of genre de vie (ways of life) and pays (social regions), ideas that have had particular resonance in American landscape studies. "By World War II," the editors remark, "each French region had its own well-written guidebooks to local physical and social landscapes" (4).

Geographer Carl Sauer, who had studied in Germany and had long tenure as the chair of the Geography department at Berkeley, in 1925 wrote the now classic definition of a cultural landscape: "The cultural landscape is fashioned from the natural landscape by a cultural group. Culture is the agent, the natural area is the medium, and cultural landscape is the result."

== Personal life ==
During the height of his career, Jackson lived just southwest of Santa Fe, New Mexico, near an historic property known as El Rancho de las Golondrinas (The Ranch of the Swallows).

Jackson died on August 29, 1996, at St. Vincent Hospital in Santa Fe. He was 86 and lived in La Cienega, New Mexico.

=== Awards and honors ===
John Brinckerhoff Jackson received the PEN/Diamonstein-Spielvogel Award for the Art of the Essay for A Sense of Place, a Sense of Time in 1995.

J.B. Jackson received the Silver Star for exemplary service in WWII.

== Published works ==
Jackson's published works include:

- Landscapes: Selected Writings of J. B. Jackson (1970)
- American Space: The Centennial Years, 1865–1876 (1972)
- The Interpretation of Ordinary Landscapes: Geographical Essays edited with D. W. Meinig (1979)
- The Necessity for Ruins and Other Topics (1980)
- Discovering the Vernacular Landscape (1984)
- A Sense of Place, a Sense of Time (1994)
- Landscape in Sight: Looking at America (1997)

== Quotes ==
- "The older I grow and the longer I look at landscapes and seek to understand them, the more convinced I am that their beauty is not simply an aspect but their very essence and that that beauty derives from the human presence."
- "Let us hope that the merits and charm of the highway strip are not so obscure but they will be accepted by a wider public."
- "The bicycle had, and still has, a humane, almost classical moderation in the kind of pleasure it offers. It is the kind of machine that a Hellenistic Greek might have invented and ridden. It does no violence to our normal reactions: It does not pretend to free us from our normal environment."
- "The way a city grows, the direction in which it spreads, is a factor not so much of zoning or real estate activity or land values but of highways."
- "Ruins provide the incentive for restoration, and for a return to origins. There has to be an interim of death or rejection before there can be renewal and reform."
