= Kenmore Square =

Square in Boston, Massachusetts, United States

- {{{other_names}}}
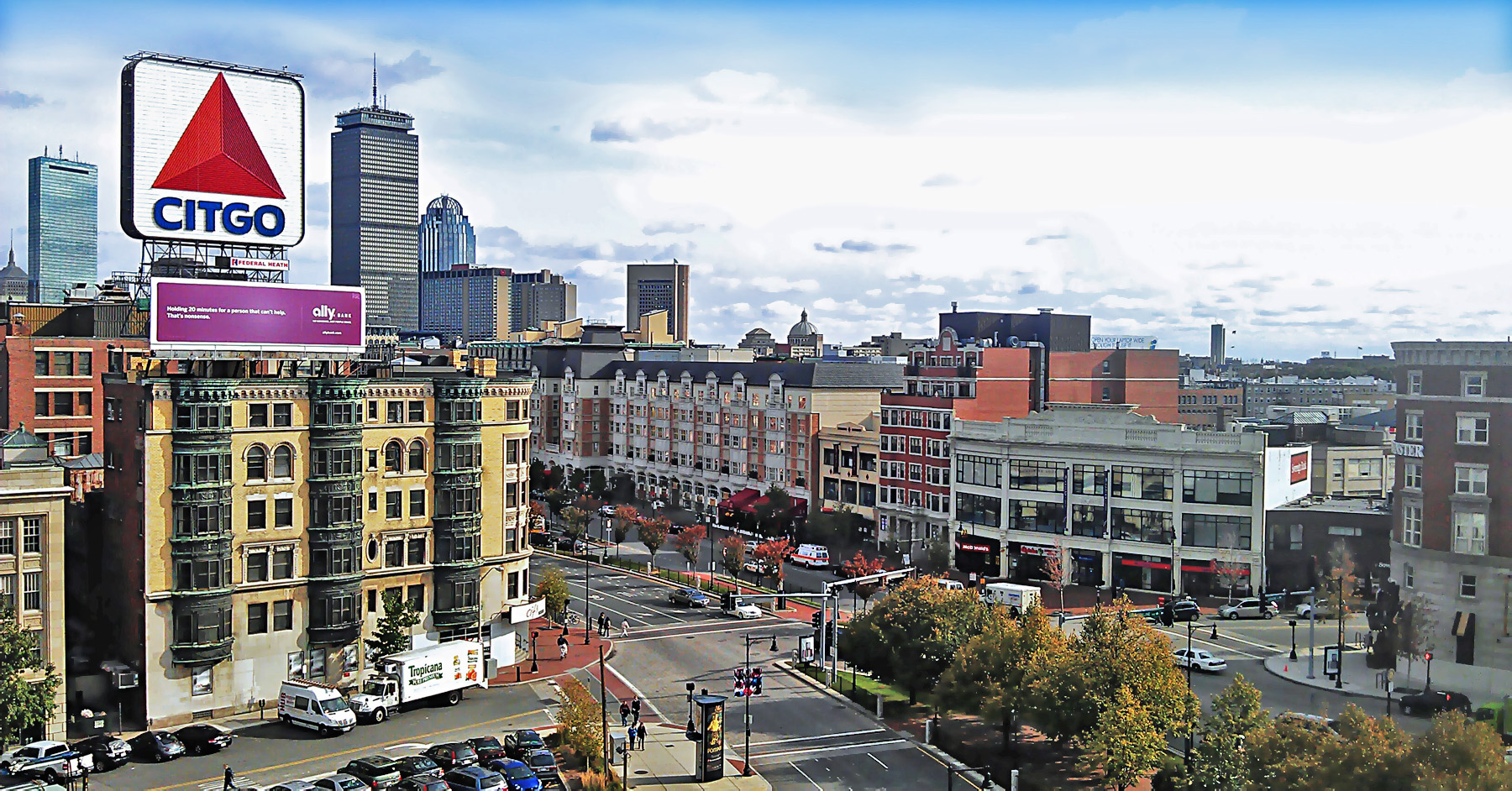
- Kenmore Square in November 2011
- Features: Citgo sign
- Location: Boston, Massachusetts
- Intersection: Beacon Street, Commonwealth Avenue
- Interactive map of Kenmore Square
- Coordinates: 42°20′55″N 71°05′44″W

Kenmore Square is a square in the Fenway–Kenmore neighborhood of Boston, Massachusetts. It is formed by the crossing of Beacon Street, Commonwealth Avenue, and Brookline Avenue. It is the eastern terminus of U.S. Route 20, the longest U.S. Highway. The Citgo sign is a prominent landmark in Kenmore Square, and Fenway Park is just to the south. Kenmore station is located under the square, with a surface bus terminal inside the square.

== History ==
In early Colonial times the land that is now Kenmore Square was an uninhabited corner of the mainland where the narrow Charles River fed into the wide, marshy Back Bay. It was part of the colonial settlement of Boston until 1705, when the hamlet of Muddy River incorporated as the independent town of Brookline. The land ended up in Brookline because the Muddy River - several blocks to the east - formed the eastern border of the new city.

An 1821 map shows the area known as Sewell's Point, with Great Dam, Brighton Road (Brighton Ave and Commonwealth Ave), and Punch Bowl Road (now Brookline Ave) intersecting at Sewell's Point then connected to the mainland to the west, in addition to the southern connection shown in 1777.

The portion of Beacon Street west of Governor Square was laid out in 1850, intersecting with Avenue Street (now the Allston portion of Commonwealth Avenue), Mill Dam Road (now Brookline Avenue), and Western Avenue, a road traversing the Back Bay mill dam in approximately the modern location of Beacon Street. The Boston and Worcester Rail Road and the Charles River Branch Railroad combined here to cross the Back Bay on a separate railroad bridge, making a beeline for the Leather District. The railroad lines still exist on more or less their original alignments, with the city developing around them.

The town of Brighton was merged with Boston in 1874, and the Boston-Brookline line was redrawn to connect the new Back Bay neighborhood with Allston-Brighton. Even as late as 1880, Governor Square was only sparsely developed. By 1890, the Back Bay landfill project had reached the square, for the first time fully connecting it with parts of the city to the east.

Streetcar tracks were laid on Beacon Street in 1888, passing through Governor Square on the surface, from Coolidge Corner to Massachusetts Avenue. These would eventually become the Green Line C branch. Tracks were laid on what by then was called Commonwealth Avenue in 1896, from Union Square in Brighton. These would later serve the Green Line A branch and Green Line B branch. The Boylston Street subway was extended to just east of Kenmore Square in 1914. Streetcars crossed the busy square until 1932, when the underground Kenmore station opened along with a subway extension.

Governor Square was renamed Kenmore Square on December 31, 1931. The new name was taken from the streetcar stop, itself named for the short Kenmore Street. The park in the center of the square was replaced by a bus terminal in 1943.

In 1915, the Kenmore Apartments were built on the corner of Kenmore and Commonwealth Avenue. Later, the apartments became the Hotel Kenmore with 400 guest rooms. The Kenmore was owned by Bertram Druker, a prominent Boston developer and was known as the baseball hotel. It housed every one of the 14 out of town teams in Major League Baseball teams in the years following World War II. From the 1960s to 1979 it was used by Grahm Junior College as a residence hall, cafeteria, library, and classroom facility. Later, after Grahm Junior College closed and larger hotels like the Sheraton were built, the Hotel Kenmore started to show its age and eventually became apartments again. It is now called Kenmore Abbey.

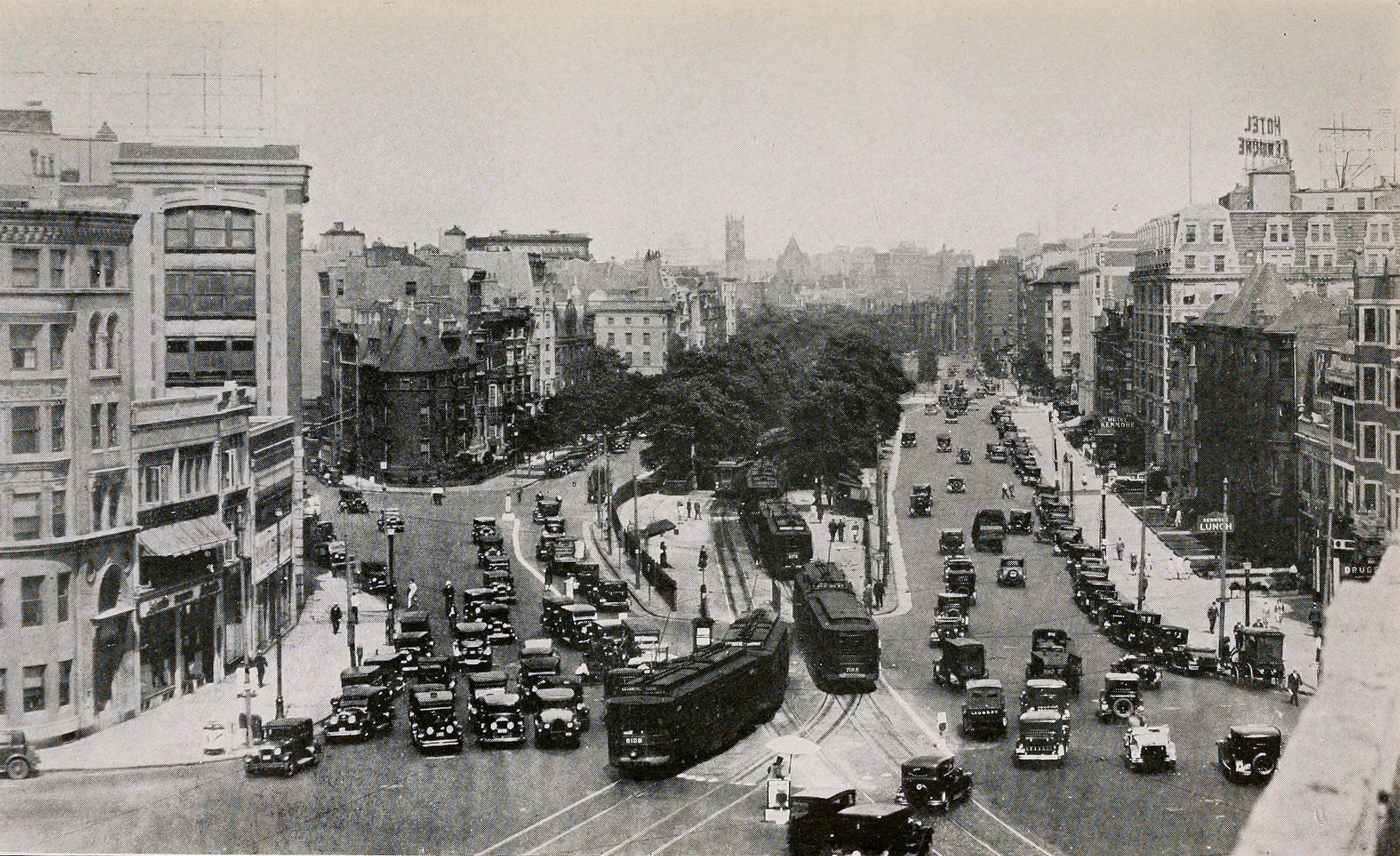
Streetcars crossing Governor Square in 1930

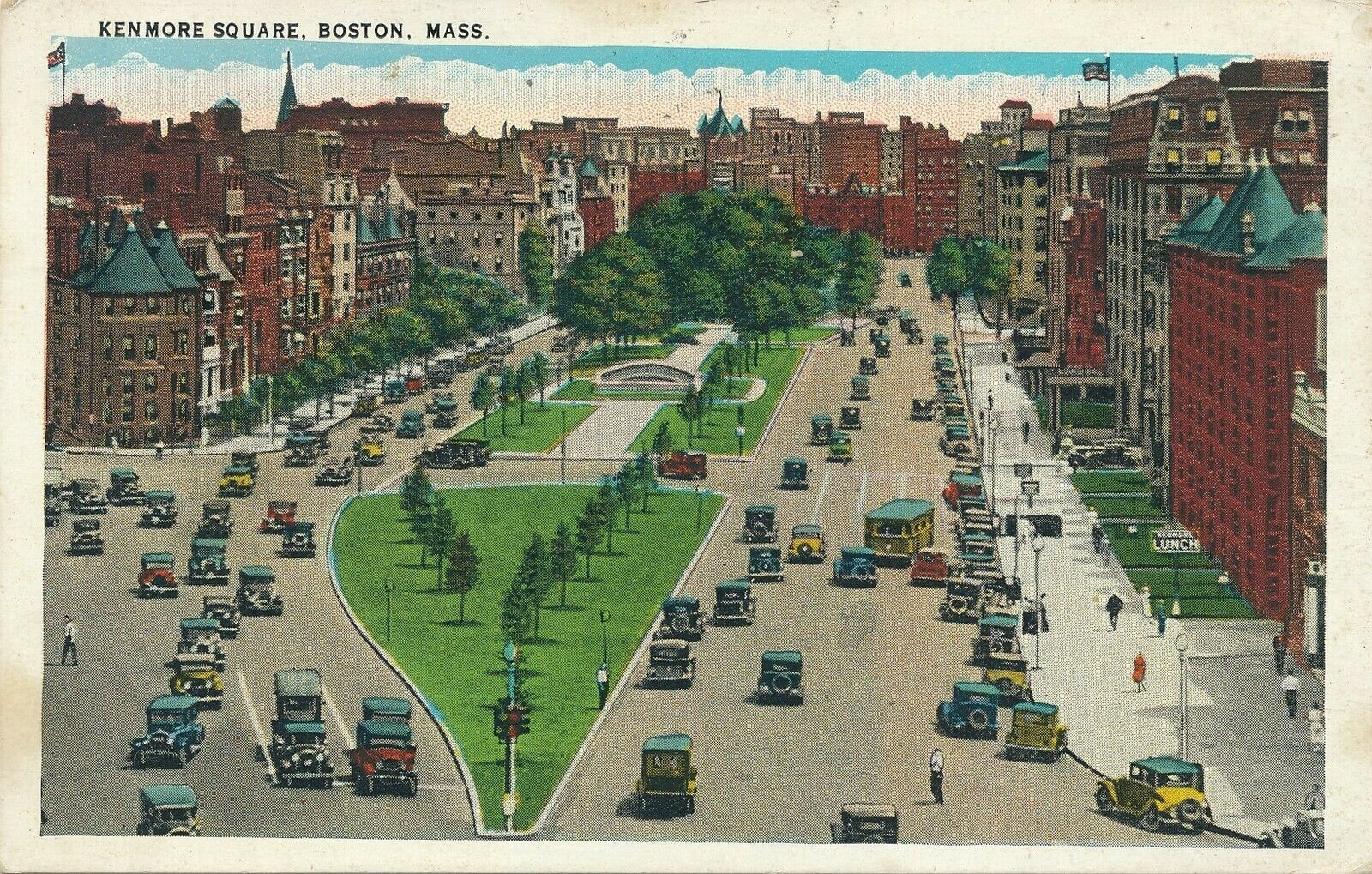
Kenmore Square in the 1930s, after the subway station opened

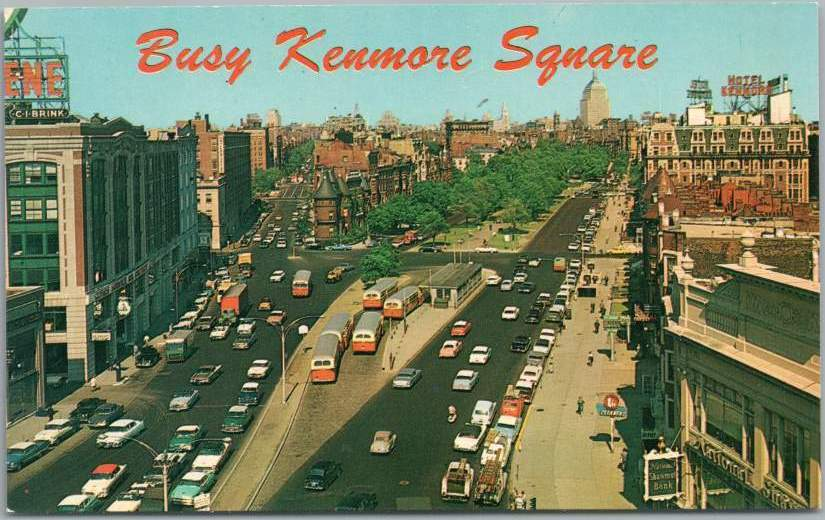
Kenmore Square in the 1950s, after the bus terminal was built

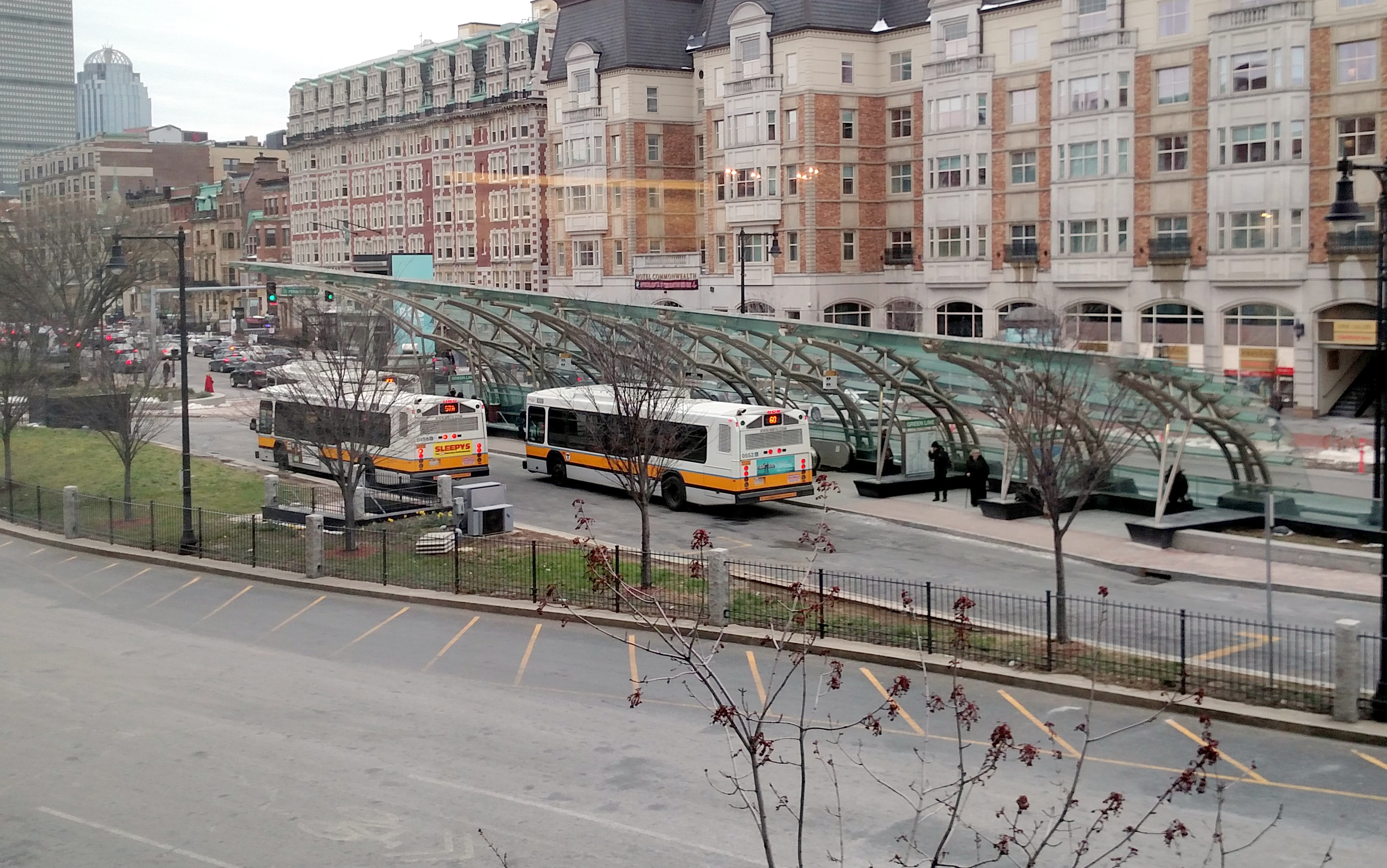
The modern bus terminal in 2016
