= Vouvray (disambiguation) =

Vouvray is a commune in the Indre-et-Loire department in central France.

Vouvray may also refer to:

- Vouvray (wine), an Appellation d'origine contrôlée (AOC, a French certification) for wine from the commune of Vouvray
- Vouvray-sur-Loir, a commune in the Sarthe department in northwestern France
- Vouvray-sur-Huisne, a commune in the Sarthe department in northwestern France
