= Boston Citgo sign =

Large sign in Boston, Massachusetts

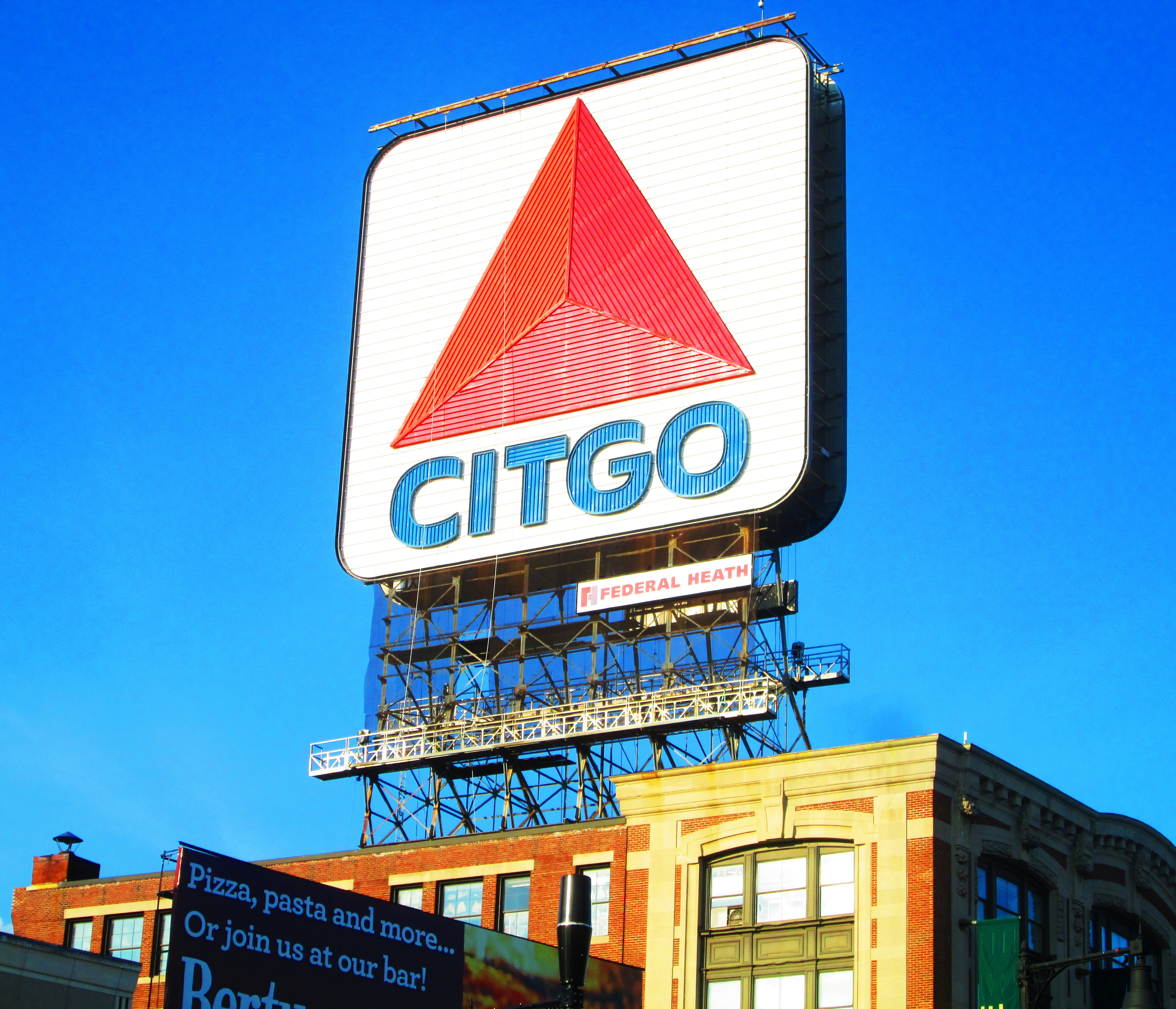
- The sign in 2017

General information
- Location: 660 Beacon Street, Boston, Massachusetts, United States
- Coordinates: 42.348712°N 71.095619°W
- Completed: 1940 (as Cities Service); 1965 (as Citgo trimark)

Technical details
- Size: 60-foot-square (18 m)

Website
- bostoncitgosign.com (archived)

The Boston Citgo sign is a large, double-faced sign featuring the logo of the oil company Citgo that overlooks Kenmore Square in Boston, Massachusetts. The sign was installed in 1940 and updated with Citgo's present logo in 1965. The sign has become a landmark of Boston through its appearance in the background of Boston Red Sox games at Fenway Park. It can also be viewed across the Charles River in Cambridge.

== Description ==
The Citgo sign is a two-sided, 60-foot-square (18 m), white sign with the Citgo logo, called the trimark, and the word mark "Citgo." It weights about 125,000 pounds. The sign advertises the oil company Citgo, which is a subsidiary of Petróleos de Venezuela S.A. The sign features thousands of light-emitting diodes (LEDs) that turn off every night at midnight. The current sign was unveiled in March 2005 after a six-month restoration project. LEDs were selected for their durability, energy efficiency, intensity, and ease of maintenance.

On October 15, 2008, a small electrical fire inside the sign caused approximately $5,000 worth of damage, partially melting the plastic and leaving visible smoke damage. The Citgo sign was shut down for several months beginning in July 2010 to replace the LEDs with a newer version hopefully more capable of withstanding the winds and temperature extremes that affect the sign. Earlier versions featured neon lighting; the pre-2005 sign contained 5,878 glass tubes with a total length of more than 5 miles (8.0 km).

The Citgo sign is known nationally for appearing above the Green Monster during televised games of the Boston Red Sox at Fenway Park. The sign has been nicknamed "See It Go," especially when a home run is hit during a game. This visibility has led to the installation of replica signs.

== History ==
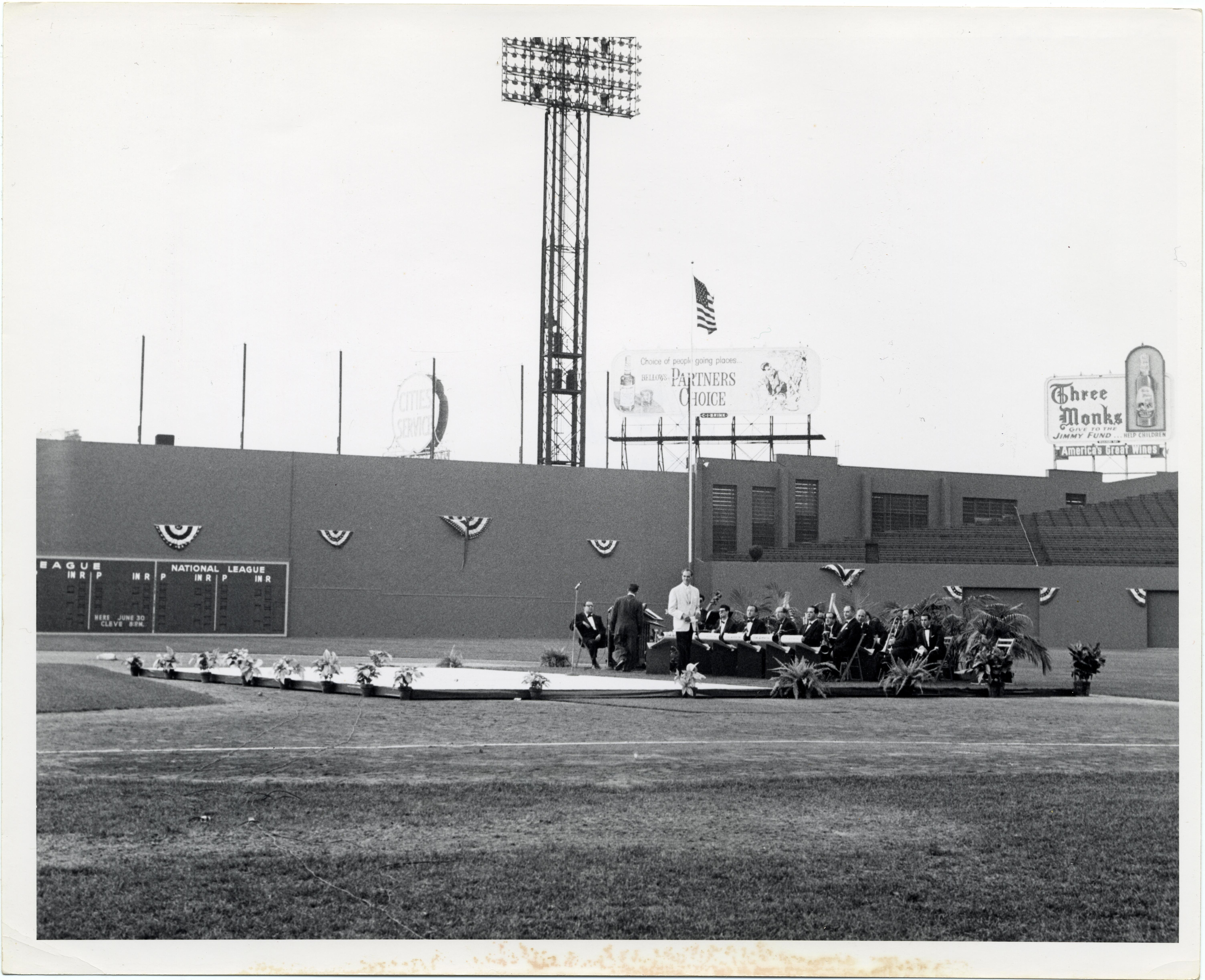
An orchestra inside Fenway Park in June 1961, with the Cities Service sign visible to the left of the light tower base

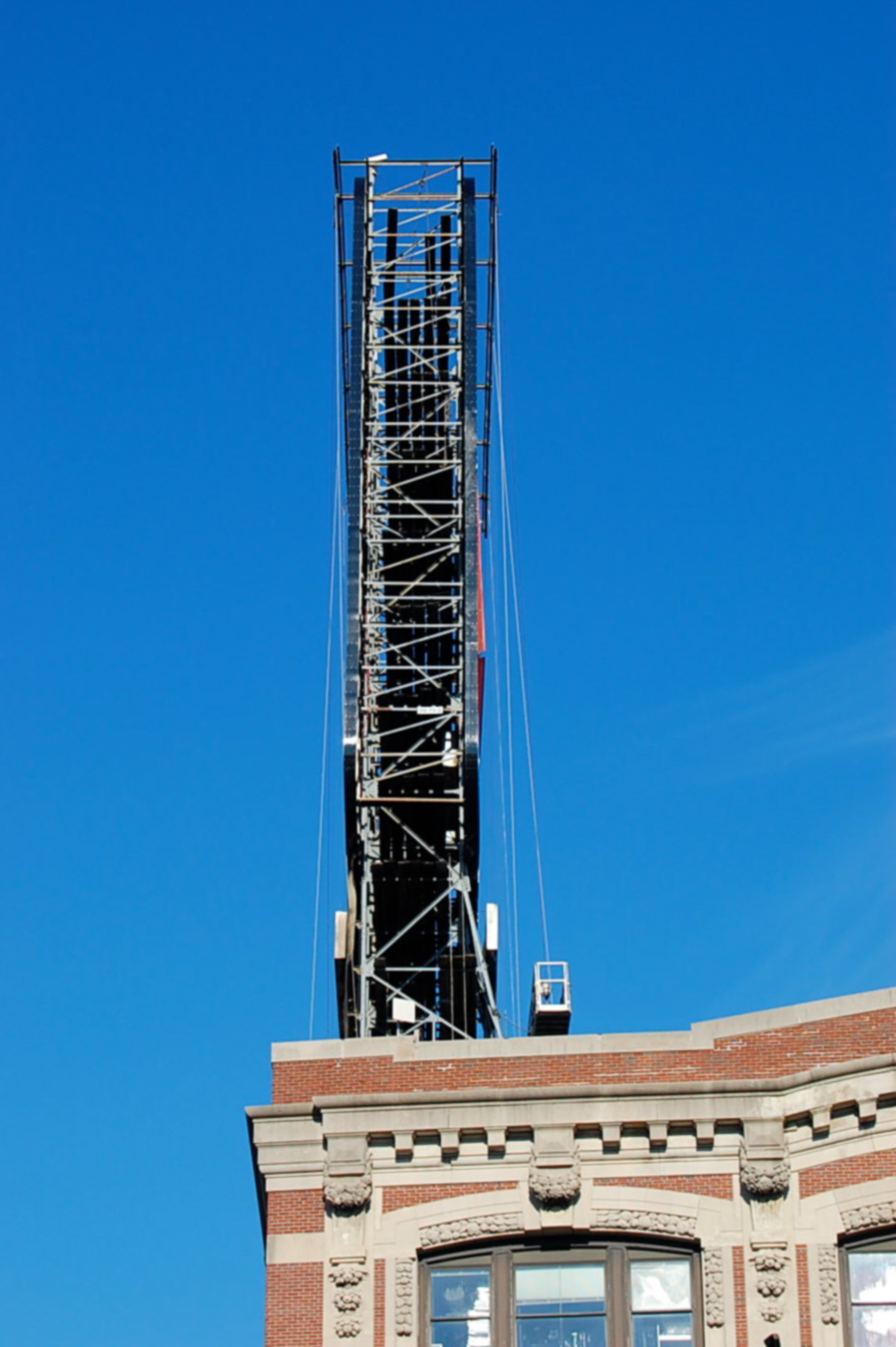
Profile view showing the sign's inner steel skeleton

The first sign, featuring the Cities Service green-and-white trefoil logo, was built in 1940 by the C.I. Brink Sign Company. That sign was replaced with the trimark in 1965. Although there was, originally, a Cities Service station on the ground floor of the building, there is no associated Citgo gas station, so the sign is now a historical landmark. In 1979, Governor Edward J. King ordered the sign turned off as a symbol of energy conservation.

Other petroleum companies raised similar high-visibility signs outside Fenway in the 1940s, including Socony Mobil and Gulf, but only the Cities Service sign proved to be long-lasting.

Four years later, Citgo attempted to disassemble the weather-beaten sign and was surprised to be met with widespread public affection for the sign and protest at its threatened removal. The Boston Landmarks Commission ordered its disassembly postponed while the issue was debated. Following a campaign that The New York Times said was "spearheaded" by Boston area preservationist Arthur J. Krim, the sign was refurbished and relit by Citgo in 1983, an event that drew a cheering crowd of 1,000 fans of the sign, and has remained in operation ever since.

In September 2006, Jerry McDermott, a Boston city councillor, proposed that the sign be removed in response to Venezuelan President Hugo Chávez's insults toward U.S. President George W. Bush. McDermott also suggested draping an American flag or Boston Red Sox banner over the sign until Chávez was out of office.

In July 2016, the Boston Landmarks Commission voted to grant preliminary landmark status to the sign. The preliminary status prevented the sign from being removed from the building until the commission conducted a three-month study, to be followed by a vote on permanent landmark status in October 2016.

In October 2016, The Boston Globe reported that local developer Related Beal purchased the building on which the sign sits as part of a $140 million, nine-building deal. Under former owner Boston University, Citgo paid a below market rate of $250,000 a year for the sign. Beal agreed on March 15, 2017, to retain the sign for "decades to come." On November 13, 2018, the Boston Landmarks Commission voted unanimously to designate the sign as an official Boston Landmark. That action was subsequently vetoed in late November by Mayor of Boston Marty Walsh. Walsh's veto was coincident with an agreement between Citgo and Beal on a lease that will allow the sign to remain in place for another 30 years.

On August 10, 2020, members of the global environmental movement Extinction Rebellion hoisted a 42-foot-square (13 m) banner over the front of the sign that read "CLIMATE JUSTICE NOW" to help draw attention to environmental issues as a result of the fossil fuel industry. A total of 10 participants from Boston, New York, and Vermont chapters of the group were arrested on charges of trespassing and disturbing the peace after the banner was brought down.

On October 15, 2025, the city of Boston approved a plan to move the Citgo sign 30 feet (9.1 m) higher and 130 feet (40 m) eastwards, to ensure future visibility amongst Kenmore Square high-rise development. In November 2026, the city planned a public celebration to mark the Citgo sign's relighting, including musical performances by the Boston University Pep Band and the Berklee College of Music House Band.

== Replicas ==
Daikin Park, home of the Houston Astros, had a replica of the sign behind left field. Replicas of the sign appear in two minor league baseball ballparks. Hadlock Field, home of the Double-A Portland Sea Dogs in Portland, Maine, has a replica of the Citgo sign above its replica of the Green Monster, the Maine Monster. The Double-A Astros affiliate Corpus Christi Hooks have a 50-foot-square (15 m) replica of the sign at their ballpark, Whataburger Field. The association with Fenway Park and the Red Sox is so strong that some local Little League fields often are decorated with replicas of the Citgo sign.

The sign was highlighted in the 1968 short film Go, Go Citgo, a 1983 Life Magazine photograph feature, and the 1989 feature film Field of Dreams. The sign is caricatured in Neal Stephenson's 1984 novel The Big U as "the Big Wheel sign," which is worshipped by members of a fictional American Megaversity fraternity.

In baseball video games like those in the MLB: The Show series, a lookalike version of the sign appears with a Red Sox logo inside the trimark, and no lettering is used. More recent games, such as Fallout 4, feature full corporate licenses allowing the sign to appear accurately.

== See also ==
- Shell Oil Company "Spectacular" Sign
