= Landscape (magazine) =

Human geography magazine

Landscape was a magazine of human geography founded by J.B. Jackson in 1951 and published three times a year in Berkeley, California until 1999.

== History ==
The magazine's original subtitle was "Human Geography of the Southwest"; this was later dropped.

The first five issues consisted largely of Jackson's own essays. Jackson was the magazine's publisher and editor until 1968. Publication was suspended from 1971–1974.

Its ISSN was 0023-8023.
