= Matrilineality in Judaism =

Tracing of Jewish descent through maternal lineage

In Rabbinic Judaism, the traditional method of determining Jewishness relies on tracing one's maternal line. According to halakha, the recognition of someone as fully Jewish at birth requires them to have been born to a Jewish mother. A person who is born to a non-Jewish mother and a Jewish father is regarded as Zera Yisrael (lit. 'Seed of Israel') and will only be accepted as ethnically Jewish and not as religiously Jewish. Thus, being Jewish through the paternal line typically necessitates conversion to Judaism to validate one's identity as a Jew in the fullest sense.

Matrilineal descent is observed in Orthodox Judaism and Conservative Judaism, whereas Reform Judaism and Reconstructionist Judaism accept full Jewishness through either parent; Reform responsa, however, require an exclusively Jewish upbringing. Many scholars believe that patrilineal descent was observed by the ancient Israelites and that at some point Judaism switched to predominantly observing matrilineal descent. Orthodox Jews maintain that matrilineal descent determined Jewish status among the Israelites from the start while patrilineal descent was used to determine one's tribe. Patrilineal descent is observed by the Samaritans and in Karaite Judaism, which asserts that only the Hebrew Bible by itself—that is, disregarding the oral traditions of Rabbinic Judaism—is legally and religiously binding.

== Contemporary Judaism ==
The practice of matrilineal descent differs by denomination. Each denomination has protocols for conversion to Judaism for those who are not Jewish by birth. The State of Israel adheres to the Jewish law of matrilineal descent for matters which could affect Israeli family law.

=== Conservative ===
The Conservative Movement practices matrilineal descent. In 1986, the Conservative Movement's Rabbinical Assembly reiterated the commitment of the Conservative Movement to the practice of matrilineal descent. Furthermore, the movement stated that any rabbi who accepts the principle of patrilineal descent will be subject to expulsion from the Rabbinical Assembly. Still, the Conservative Movement affirmed that "sincere Jews by choice" should be warmly welcomed into the community and that "sensitivity should be shown to Jews who have intermarried and their families." The Conservative Judaism movement actively reaches out to intermarried families by offering them opportunities for Jewish growth and enrichment.

The Ratner Center for the Study of Conservative Judaism conducted a survey of 1,617 members of 27 Conservative congregations in the U.S. and Canada in 1995. 69% of respondents to the Ratner Center survey agreed that they would regard personally as a Jew anyone who was raised Jewish—even if their mother was Gentile and their father was Jewish (Wertheimer, 59). In this same survey, 29% of respondents indicated that they attended Jewish religious services twice a month or more and 13% that they engage in the study of a Jewish text once a month or more (Wertheimer, 55–57).

=== Karaite ===
The majority view in Karaite Judaism is that Jewish identity can only be transmitted by patrilineal descent. They argue that only patrilineal descent can transmit Jewish identity on the grounds that all descent in the Torah went according to the male line. Only someone who is patrilineally Jewish (someone whose father's father was Jewish) is regarded as a Jew by the Mo'eṣet HaḤakhamim, or the Karaite Council of Sages based in Israel.

Both Rabbinic and Karaite Jews lived in 12th century Egypt, and a number of marriage contracts between Karaite and Rabbinic individuals have been discovered in the Cairo Genizah. The Egyptian Karaites followed patrilineal descent, but forbade marriage with non-Jews and also did not allow converts into their community. In effect then, 12th century Egyptian Karaites required that both parents be Jewish, but they referred to this requirement as patrilineal descent. Thus, marriages between Karaites and the Rabbinic community did not violate the Rabbinate requirement of matrilineality. However, these marriages came to a halt when Maimonides (who led the Rabbinate Jewish community in Egypt in the late 12th century) prohibited them for a separate reason: while he considered Karaites Jewish, he also considered them to potentially fall within the category of mamzerut, as their divorces were not conducted according to Rabbinate standards.

=== Orthodox ===
Orthodox Judaism practices matrilineal descent. Orthodox Judaism holds that anyone with a Jewish mother also has irrevocable Jewish status; that even were such a Jew to convert to another religion, that person would still be considered Jewish by Jewish Law.

=== Reconstructionist ===
Reconstructionist Judaism was the first movement to adopt the idea of bilineal descent in 1968. According to Reconstructionist Judaism, children of one Jewish parent, regardless of gender, are considered Jewish if raised as Jews.

=== Reform ===
In 1983, the Central Conference of American Rabbis of Reform Judaism passed a resolution waiving the need for formal conversion for anyone with at least one Jewish parent, provided that either (a) one is raised as a Jew, by Reform standards, or (b) one engages in an appropriate act of public identification, formalizing a practice that had been common in Reform synagogues for at least a generation. This 1983 resolution departed from the Reform Movement's previous position requiring formal conversion to Judaism for children without a Jewish mother.

The 1983 resolution of the American Reform movement has had a mixed reception in Reform Jewish communities outside of the United States. Most notably, the Israel Movement for Reform and Progressive Judaism has rejected patrilineal descent and requires formal conversion for anyone without a Jewish mother. As well, a joint Orthodox, Traditional, Conservative and Reform Bet Din formed in Denver, Colorado to promote uniform standards for conversion to Judaism was dissolved in 1983, due to that Reform resolution. However, in 2015 the majority of Britain's Assembly of Reform Rabbis voted in favor of a position paper proposing "that individuals who live a Jewish life, and who are patrilineally Jewish, can be welcomed into the Jewish community and confirmed as Jewish through an individual process." Britain's Assembly of Reform Rabbis stated that rabbis "would be able to take local decisions—ratified by the Beit Din—confirming Jewish status."

Other movements within the World Union for Progressive Judaism also adopted essentially the same position. These include: Liberal Judaism in England; Progressive Judaism in Australia; one congregation in Austria; some congregations in Eastern Europe. Note that Reform Judaism in Canada adopts a different position, similar to that of Conservative Judaism (though there may be an accelerated conversion process for the children of Jewish fathers).

=== Rabbinic outlook ===
Orthodox Judaism maintains that the law of matrilineal descent in Judaism dates at least to the time of the covenant at Sinai (c. 1310 BCE). This law was first codified in writing in the Mishna (c. 2nd century CE), and later in the Mishneh Torah (c. 1170–1180 CE) and Shulchan Aruch (1563 CE), without mention of any dissenting opinion.

According to one opinion, Jewish descent was patrilineal before the giving of the Torah, and only since then has been matrilineal.

The Talmud adduces the law of matrilineal descent from Deuteronomy 7:3–4, which warns that as the consequence of intermarriage "he (the gentile father) will turn away your son (i.e., the child born to your Jewish daughter) from following Me". Since only "he" (a non-Jewish father) is mentioned and not "she" (a non-Jewish mother), the Talmud concludes that "your (grand)son who comes from an Israelite woman is called 'your son' (and warned about in the verse), while your (grand)son who comes from a foreign woman is not called 'your son'". Thus, Jewish descent is through the mother.

The Matriarchs of Israel are considered the mothers of the Tribes of Israel; for those who adhere to Jewish Law, Israelite Nationhood or belonging to the Jewish People via descent exclusively follows the mother's line.

Some Hasidic Jewish groups propose that matrilineality and matriarchy within Judaism are related to the metaphysical concept of the Jewish soul.

== History ==
=== Biblical period ===
==== Patriarchs and Matriarchs ====
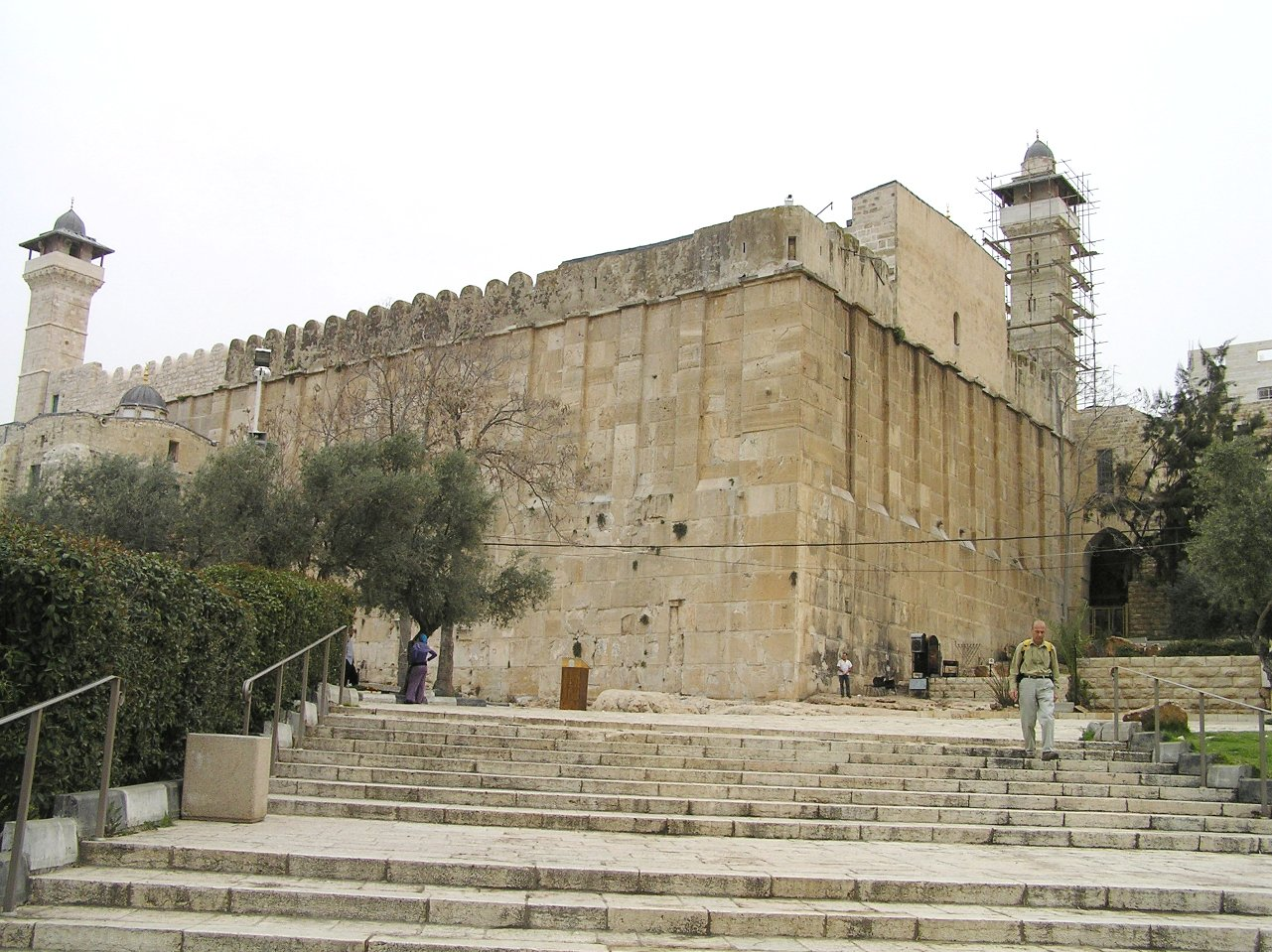
Cave of the Machpelah, believed to be the burial place of Abraham and Sarah, Isaac and Rebecca, Jacob and Leah

The Tomb of Rachel in Bethlehem. Photo c. 1933

The stories of the patriarchs and matriarchs in Genesis are generally compatible with matrilineal descent, if one makes the assumption that Abraham's extended family was "Jewish":

- Abraham fathered children with three wives or concubines: Sarah, Hagar, and Keturah, although it is likely that there were only two, as Hagar and Keturah appear to be different names used for the same person. According to Jewish tradition, Sarah was a member of Abraham's extended family, and her descendants became Jewish. The descendants of Hagar/Keturah were considered non-Jewish.
- Isaac had one wife (Rebecca, a member of Abraham's extended family) and two sons, Jacob and Esau. Jacob's descendants became Jewish. Esau's descendants were non-Jewish: assuming matrilineality, this was a result of his wives being Hittite and Ishmaelite.
- Jacob had two wives (Leah and Rachel, members of Abraham's extended family) and two concubines (Zilpah and Bilhah, who entered the family as maidservants of Leah and Rachel). All of Jacob's children were considered Jewish. As for why Zilpah and Bilhah's children were considered Jewish despite their mothers having unspecified ancestry, rabbinic sources posit that Zilpah and Bilhah were actually the half-sisters of Leah and Rachel. Alternatively, as Zilpah and Bilhah were maidservants, their children were considered to belong to their mistresses Leah and Rachel.

The stories are generally incompatible with patrilineal descent, in that a single father (Abraham or Isaac) had children, some of whom were considered the ancestors of Jews and others of non-Jews.

In Genesis 21:13 God refers to Hagar's son as "the son of the maidservant" rather than "your [Abraham's] son" (while also referring to Hagar's son as Abraham's seed); later rabbinic sources deduce from this that a Jewish man's child is considered "his" child only if the mother is Jewish.

==== Moses ====
Moses married Zipporah, a Midianite woman. They had two sons, Gershom and Eliezer, both born before the Exodus. The sons of Moses—with an Israelite father and Midianite mother—are absent from the genealogies of Levi, which do include the sons of Moses' brother Aaron (whose wife was Israelite).

==== Ruth and Naamah ====
In the accounts of the Prophets and Writings (which covers a time period of nearly a millennium) there are two cases of non-Israelite women who voluntarily (not resulting from conflict) married Israelites where their children were considered Israelite. According to the Talmud, both of these women, Ruth and Naamah, formally converted. Both the Moabite and Ammonite nations were descended from Lot, the nephew of Abraham.

In the Book of Ruth, Naomi and her husband Elimelech were a Judean couple. Their family moved to Moab during a famine, but Elimelech died there. Naomi's two sons married Moabite women, named Ruth and Orpah. Naomi's two sons then died. Naomi and Ruth then journeyed back to Judah. Then in selling her late husband's land in Judah and the estates of her sons, Naomi set up the stipulation that her financial redeemer also marry her former daughter-in-law. The first potential redeemer declined, lest this marriage "ruin [his] inheritance". Boaz, the next of kin, became Naomi's redeemer, married Ruth and became the father of Obed, who was the ancestor of David. Ruth was the mother of Obed, but Naomi cared for the child, and their neighbors would say "A son has been born to Naomi".

Solomon "loved many foreign women". Among them was Naamah the Ammonite. Solomon and Naamah's son Rehoboam was a Judean king of the Davidic line.

==== Tamar bat David ====
In 2 Samuel 13, Tamar, daughter of King David, attempted to persuade her half-brother Amnon not to rape her, by suggesting that he could legitimately marry her instead. This suggestion is difficult to understand, as Leviticus 18:9 prohibits marriage to half-siblings by either father or mother. Rashi (1040–1105 CE) attempted to resolve this problem by noting that Tamar's mother was a non-Israelite—Maacah, daughter of Talmai king of Geshur. If Jewish descent is matrilineal, and Maacah was not converted to Israelite religion at the time Tamar was conceived, then Tamar would be born non-Israelite, legally unrelated to Amnon (despite being his half-sister) and thus permitted to marry him.

==== Ezra ====
Ezra 9–10 describes how many Israelite men had intermarried with non-Jewish women, and tells the story of their renunciation of intermarriage and separation from the non-Jewish wives and from their children. While Ezra and Nehemiah prohibited intermarriage by both men and women, only regarding intermarriage between a Jewish man and non-Jewish woman was it necessary to separate from the children.

The necessity of separating from the children as well as the wives suggests that the children were not considered Jewish despite having Jewish fathers. In rabbinic sources, this verse is understood to be proof of matrilinearity.

==== Jewishness of half Israelites ====
Several Biblical individuals appear to have been treated as Jewish despite having a non-Jewish father. Hiram the craftsman was employed to build Solomon's Temple despite having a Phoenician father (and Israelite mother). Amasa was entrusted with control of an Israelite army, despite having a non-Israelite father (and Israelite mother).

=== Post-biblical ===
The Hellenistic Jewish philosopher, Philo of Alexandria (c. 20 BCE–50 CE) calls the child of a Jew and a non-Jew a nothos (bastard), regardless of whether the non-Jewish parent is the father or the mother. An article by Maren R. Niehoff argues that Philo was at least considering the matrilineal principle.

Flavius Josephus (c. 37–100 CE), the Romanized Jewish historian, describes Antigonus II Mattathias (c. 63–37 BCE) denigrating Herod—whose father's family were Idumean Arabs forcibly converted to Judaism by John Hyrcanus and whose mother, according to Josephus, was non-Jewish (either an Idumean Arab or Arabian (Nabatean-Arab))—by referring to him as "an Idumean i.e. a half-Jew" and as therefore unfit to be given governorship of Judea by the Romans (as Deuteronomy 17:15 requires the king to be Jewish).

=== Modern period ===
Though numerous modern academics believe that Judaism at some point was patrilineal, the precise date of the shift from patrilineality to matrilineality is disputed. According to many modern academic opinions it was likely instituted in either the early Tannaitic period (c. 10–70 CE) or in the time of Ezra (c. 460 BCE). Historical evidence marshalled by Professor Shaye J. D. Cohen indicates that a change from a patrilineal to a matrilineal-based principle for the offspring of mixed unions of Jew and gentile took place in the 1st century, specifically c. 10–70 CE.

Rabbi Immanuel Jakobovits offers some possible reasons for the law of matrilineality:

Several reasons may be given for the rule. A child from a mixed marriage could not legally be a 50% Jew, growing up with a half commitment or a double faith. A choice must be made, and once made, it must be consistently applied in all cases, since no law can be arbitrary or subject to personal variations. Now, in making this choice, the certainty of maternity must be set against the doubt of paternity, however small this doubt may be. In such cases Jewish law invariably invokes the rule "a doubt can never over-rule a certainty".

Even in nature, the mother's bond with her child is, in some respects, firmer than the father's. It was Eve (Hebrew Chavah) who was so called "because she was the mother of all living (chay)" (Gen. 3:20), whereas Adam was not named "Chayim" as "the father of all life". It must also be remembered that Jewish law, unable to sanction or recognise a mixed marriage as religiously valid, technically regards the child as born out of wedlock and therefore legally having a mother only.

In a wider sense, the determination of the child's religious status by the mother may also indicate that she has the superior influence on the child's religious development.

Rabbi Louis Jacobs wrote in a review of an article by Shaye J. D. Cohen on matrilineal descent in Judaism:

There has been a development of the law in these instances from Biblical and pre-Rabbinic times. The attempt to find reasons for the change, however, has proved to be elusive and is quite unnecessary since it can be explained entirely economically by the logic of the law itself and is typical of Rabbinic thinking in general. But the development in the law had already taken place before the redaction of the Mishnah at the very latest. With the exception of the Rabbi in the Jerusalem Talmud (Qiddushin, 3:12) who permitted the child of a gentile mother and Jewish father to be circumcised on the Sabbath and whose opinion was vehemently rejected, the law is accepted unanimously in both Talmuds. It is recorded as the law in all the Codes without dissenting voice and has been the universal norm in all Jewish communities. For such a law to be changed, only the weightiest religious and ethical advantages will suffice and it is difficult indeed to discover any such in the change in this particular instance. To change this particular law would strike at the heart of the whole halakhic process and would involve a theological as well as an halakhic upheaval. And for what? The potential loss is great. The gains, if any, are few and the price is far too high.

Cohen himself questions the date of origin of matrilineal descent as follows:

The preexilic portions of the Hebrew Bible are not familiar with the matrilineal principle. Numerous Israelite heroes and kings married foreign women; for example, Judah married a Canaanite, Joseph an Egyptian, Moses a Midianite and an Ethiopian, David a Philistine, and Solomon women of every description. Although Exod. 34:16 and Deut. 7:1–3 prohibit intermarriage only with the Canaanites, a prohibition that was supposed to have originated with the patriarchs Abraham (Gen. 24:3) and Isaac (Gen. 27:46–28:1), some Israelites extended the prohibition to include all foreigners (Judg. 14:3). But it never occurred to anyone in preexilic times to argue that such marriages were null and void. Marriage was the non-sacramental, private acquisition of a woman by a man, and the state had little or no legal standing in the matter. The foreign woman who married an Israelite husband was supposed to leave her gods in her father's house, but even if she did not, it never occurred to anyone to argue that her children were not Israelites. Since the idea of conversion to Judaism did not yet exist, it never occurred to anyone to demand that the foreign woman undergo some ritual to indicate her acceptance of the religion of Israel. The woman was joined to the house of Israel by being joined to her Israelite husband; the act of marriage was functionally equivalent to the later idea of conversion. In some circumstances biblical law and society did pay attention to maternal identity–the children of concubines and female slaves sometimes rank lower than the children of wives–but it never occurred to anyone to impose any legal or social disabilities on the children of foreign women.

Cohen does admit one circumstance in which the Bible accepted the matrilineal status of children of an Israelite woman and non-Israelite man: a "matrilocal" marriage in which the husband moved to the wife's location and joined her clan, rather than the more typical reverse.

In his review of Cohen's article, Rabbi Jacobs accepts that the law may have changed in the early Tannaitic period (c. 10–70 CE): "From the historical evidence marshalled by Cohen it would appear that the change from the patrilineal to the matrilineal principle for the offspring of mixed unions of Jew and gentile took place in the early Tannaitic period." Other modern scholars believe that the matrilineal principle dates at least to the time of Ezra, and Cohen himself does not rule this out as a possibility.

Jacobs dismisses Cohen's suggestion that "the Tannaim were influenced by the Roman legal system..." and contends that "even if the Rabbis were familiar with the Roman law, they might have reacted to it [instead] by preserving the patrilineal principle, holding fast to their own system." Cohen's proposed connection to Roman law was also rejected by Michael Corinaldi, who noted a fundamental difference between Roman and rabbinic law: Roman law assigned matrilineal status in cases where no marriage exists and therefore the child is considered to have no father, whereas in rabbinic law a child's status is unaffected by whether the parents are married to each other.

Instead, Jacobs offers another explanation. Jacobs believes that an Israelite man who married a non-Israelite woman and had a child, that woman and child were considered not part of the "family clan" and therefore were not considered Israelite: "A child born of a Jewish father and a gentile mother cannot be given the status of the father since the patrilineal principle is stated only with regard to unions within the clan. How can the father who steps out of the clan bestow a clan status on the child whom he sires?"

Cohen, too, suggests another possible explanation: that rabbinic thought viewed maternal descent to be biologically fundamental, as shown by the Mishnah (though not the Tosefta or Babylonian Talmud), in which the species of animals for purposes of kilayim follows the mother, and applied the same standard to humans as well.

Cohen's position was also criticized by Robert Gordis, who questioned whether such a dramatic change (i.e. from patrilineality to matrilineality) would have occurred without being mentioned in the extensive sources from the time.

Lawrence Schiffman noted that Josephus described Herod as being criticized as unsuitable for Jewish monarchy, due to his non-Jewish mother and the Biblical prohibition (Deut 17:15) on installing a non-Jewish king. According to Schiffman, this indicates that matrilineality was a broadly accepted norm at the time, assumed by Josephus as well as the Mishnah. Schiffman further asserted that a matrilineal principle likely already existed at the time of Ezra, due to the natural relationship between mother and child. According to Schiffman, in the First Temple period those women who moved to Israelite territory effectively underwent "informal conversion" to join the Jewish people. But upon the loss of national territory with the Babylonian captivity, Jewish status became an individual matter, and the matrilineal principle was established.

According to Trude Weiss-Rosmarin, in a polygamous setting like Biblical society, identity was more closely tied to the mother than the father. Each wife had her own dwelling which was shared with her children, and where the husband was a visitor. The rabbinic principle of matrilineality was an adaptation of this model to a reality in which polygamy had become rare.

Arnold Goodman argued that the halakhic norm of patrilineal tribal descent and matrilineal Jewish status is a logical one: Children naturally take the status of their mother, except when the mother has been "acquired" as wife by the husband, in which the status is that of the husband. But as marriage between Jew and non-Jew is invalid in halakha, the father has no connection to the children, and status remains with the mother.

Avi Shveka argued that in both the Hebrew Bible and records of other Ancient Near East societies, clan status was transmitted patrilinearly while "social" status (e.g. status as a slave or free-born) was transmitted matrilinearly; and when a father and mother separated or divorced (breaking up the clan), the children followed the mother both physically and in status. Thus, examples of "patrilineal" status in the Bible (e.g. Solomon and Naamah, or normal tribal membership) involve intact couples within the clan, while examples of "matrilineal" status (e.g. Hagar and Ishmael, or Ezra's expulsion of both the foreign wives and their children) involve couples that separate or divorce.

== Effect of matrilineality on personal Jewishness ==
=== In the United States ===
A 2013 Pew Research Center survey shows that American children of interfaith marriages are more likely to have been raised Jewish and identify as Jewish than in the past, which some scholars attribute to more welcoming and inclusive attitudes among Jewish organizations. The increasing awareness and social validation of self-concept as defining one's identity may also be a contributing factor.

Some historical experiences of these children have included being singled out and made to feel unwelcome at Jewish events, sites and schools; pressure to disguise their heritage; being bullied or isolated; uncertainty regarding their personal identity; and narrowed access to a Jewish education and a community of faith.

=== In Europe ===
Researcher Sergio Della Pergola found that in English-speaking countries, "the mother is the dominant parent in transmitting a group identity to the children of [intermarriages]. If the mother is Jewish, the child tends more often to be identified as Jewish, and if the mother is not Jewish, the child tends to be non-Jewish."

Progressive writers Elana Maryles Sztokman and Jessica Fishman view matrilineality as an outdated patriarchal form of control over women's bodies. Fishman labels matrilineality a fundamental denial of the right of personhood.

Legal scholar Reut Paz views matrilineality as a form of "legal privilege" for women, which offers the potential for increasing gender equality in a world where power is generally patriarchal.

== See also ==
- Jewish identity
  - Who is a Jew?
    - Zera Yisrael
  - Genetic studies on Jews
- Interfaith marriage in Judaism
