= Solomon =

Biblical monarch of ancient Israel

Solomon 𐤔𐤋𐤌𐤄 שְׁלֹמֹה
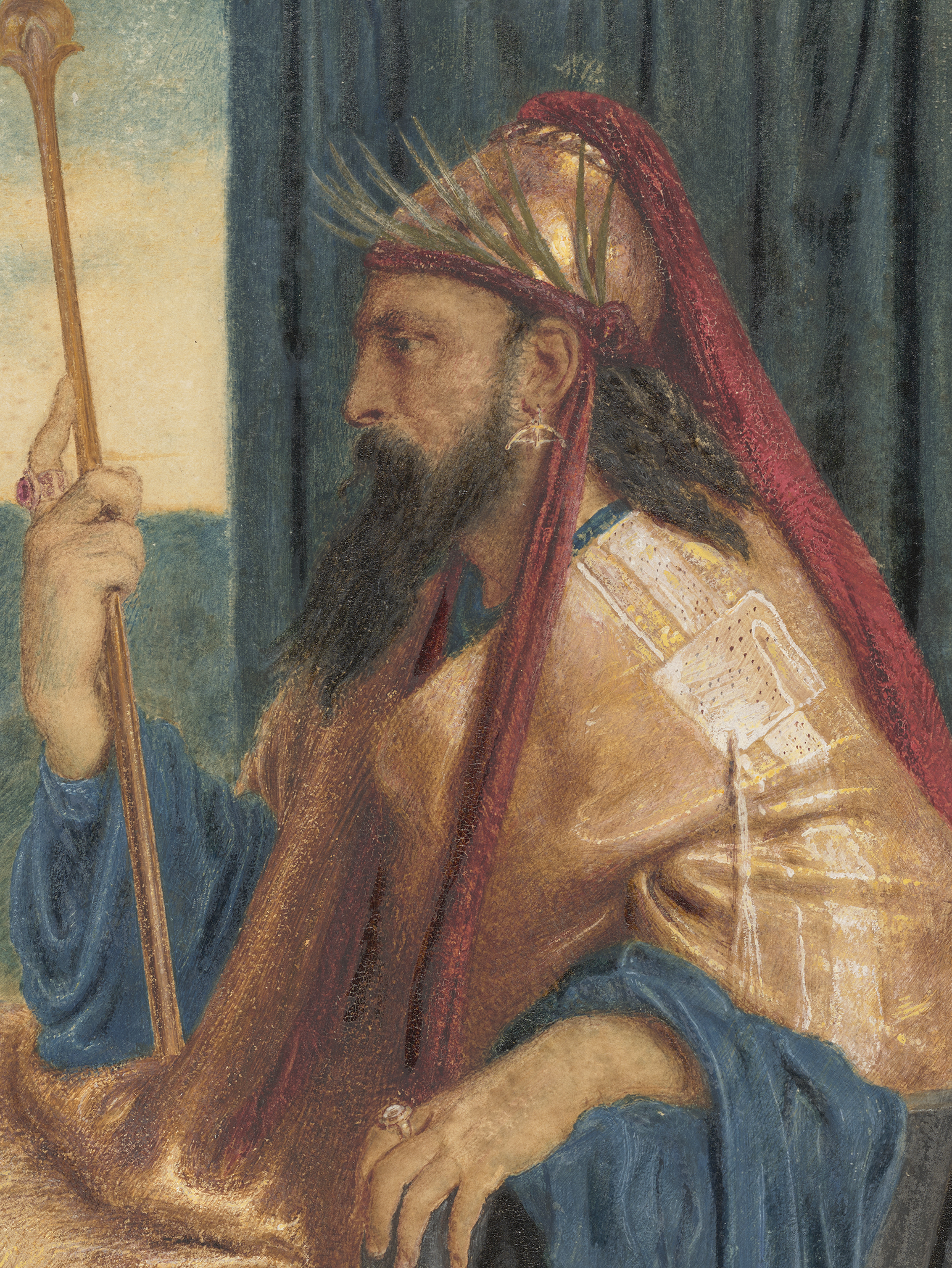
- King Solomon (1872) by Simeon Solomon

King of Israel
- Reign: c. 970–931 BCE (hypothesised)
- Predecessor: David
- Successor: Rehoboam
- Born: 11th–10th century BCE; Jerusalem, Kingdom of Israel and Judah
- Spouse: 700 wives of royal birth and 300 concubines, including: Naamah; Pharaoh's daughter
- Issue: 3 (recorded): Rehoboam; Taphath; Basemath
- Dynasty: House of David
- Father: David
- Mother: Bathsheba
- Religion: Yahwism

Solomon (/ˈsɒləmən/) (Note: Hebrew: שְׁלֹמֹה, Modern: Šlōmō, Tiberian: Šălōmō, lit. 'peaceful'; Syriac: ܫܠܶܝܡܽܘܢ, romanized: Šlēmūn; Arabic: سُلَيْمَان, romanized: Slemān, Sulaymān, or Silimān; Greek: Σολομών, romanized: Solomōn; Latin: Salomon) (Hebrew: שְׁלֹמֹה, romanized: šəlōmō), also called Jedidiah (Note: Hebrew: יְדִידְיָהּ, Modern: Yǝdīdyah, Tiberian: Yăḏīḏyāh, lit. 'beloved of Yah') (Hebrew: יְדִידְיָה, romanized: yəḏîḏĭyā), was a king of the Kingdom of Israel. The successor of his father David, he is described as the penultimate ruler of all Twelve Tribes of Israel under a united Israel and Judah. His reign is hypothesized to have lasted from c. 970–931 BCE. According to the biblical narrative, his reign brought commercial prosperity through alliances and trade, but his accumulation of wealth, horses, and foreign wives, many of whom introduced idolatry, led to divine punishment. After Solomon's death, his son Rehoboam’s harsh policies led the northern Israelites to reject the Davidic line and follow Jeroboam, splitting the kingdom into Israel in the north and Judah in the south, according to the Hebrew Bible.

Considered a Jewish prophet, Solomon is portrayed as wealthy, wise, powerful, and a dedicated follower of Yahweh (God), as attested by the eponymous Solomon's Temple. He is also traditionally regarded as the author of the biblical books of Proverbs, Ecclesiastes, and Song of Songs. He is also the subject of many later references and legends, most notably in the Testament of Solomon, part of biblical apocrypha from the 1st century CE.

The historicity of Solomon is the subject of significant debate. While current scholarship generally allows for the possibility of a historical Solomon, the details of his reign over Israel and Judah are contested; the biblical portrayal of his apparent empire's opulence is considered highly likely to be an anachronistic exaggeration.

Solomon is also revered in Christianity and Islam. In the New Testament, he is portrayed as a teacher of wisdom, compared to Jesus, and invoked rhetorically to illustrate God's generosity. In the Quran, he is considered to be a major Islamic prophet. During the Hellenistic period, Solomon also came to be known as a magician and an exorcist, with amulets and discovered seals invoking his name.

== Biblical account ==
The life of Solomon is primarily described in 2 Samuel, 1 Kings and 2 Chronicles. His two names are traditionally taken to mean "peaceful" and "friend of God", both considered "predictive of the character of his reign". A 2023 textbook described three possibilities for the etymology of Solomon’s name: “compensation or a substitute,” “the ruler of peace,” or based on the deified evening star Shalim.

=== Chronology ===
The conventional dates of Solomon's reign are derived from biblical chronology and are set from about 970 to 931 BCE. Regarding the Davidic dynasty, to which King Solomon belongs, its chronology can be checked against datable Babylonian and Assyrian records at a few points, and these correspondences have allowed archaeologists to date its kings in a modern framework. According to the most widely used chronology, based on that by the Old Testament professor Edwin R. Thiele, the death of Solomon and the division of his kingdom would have occurred in the fall of 931 BCE.

=== Childhood ===
Solomon was born in Jerusalem, the second-born child of David and his wife Bathsheba (widow of Uriah the Hittite). The first child (unnamed in that account), a son conceived adulterously during Uriah's lifetime, had died seven days after birth. The Hebrew Bible suggests that this was a judgment from God. Solomon had three named full brothers born to Bathsheba: Nathan, Shammua, and Shobab, besides six known older half-brothers born of as many mothers.

The biblical narrative shows that Solomon served as a peace offering between God and David following David's adulterous relationship with Bathsheba. In an effort to hide this sin, David sent Bathsheba's husband, Uriah the Hittite, to battle, and specifically to the front line, wherein David ordered the commanding officer Joab to withdraw support for Uriah in order to have him killed in battle by the enemy. After he died, David was finally able to marry Bathsheba. As punishment, the first child, who was conceived during the adulterous relationship, died. Solomon was born after David was forgiven. It is this reason why his name, which means peace, was chosen. Some historians cited that Nathan the Prophet brought up Solomon as his father was busy governing the realm. This could also be attributed to the notion that the prophet held great influence over David because he knew of his adultery, which was considered a grievous offense under the Mosaic Law.

=== Succession and administration ===
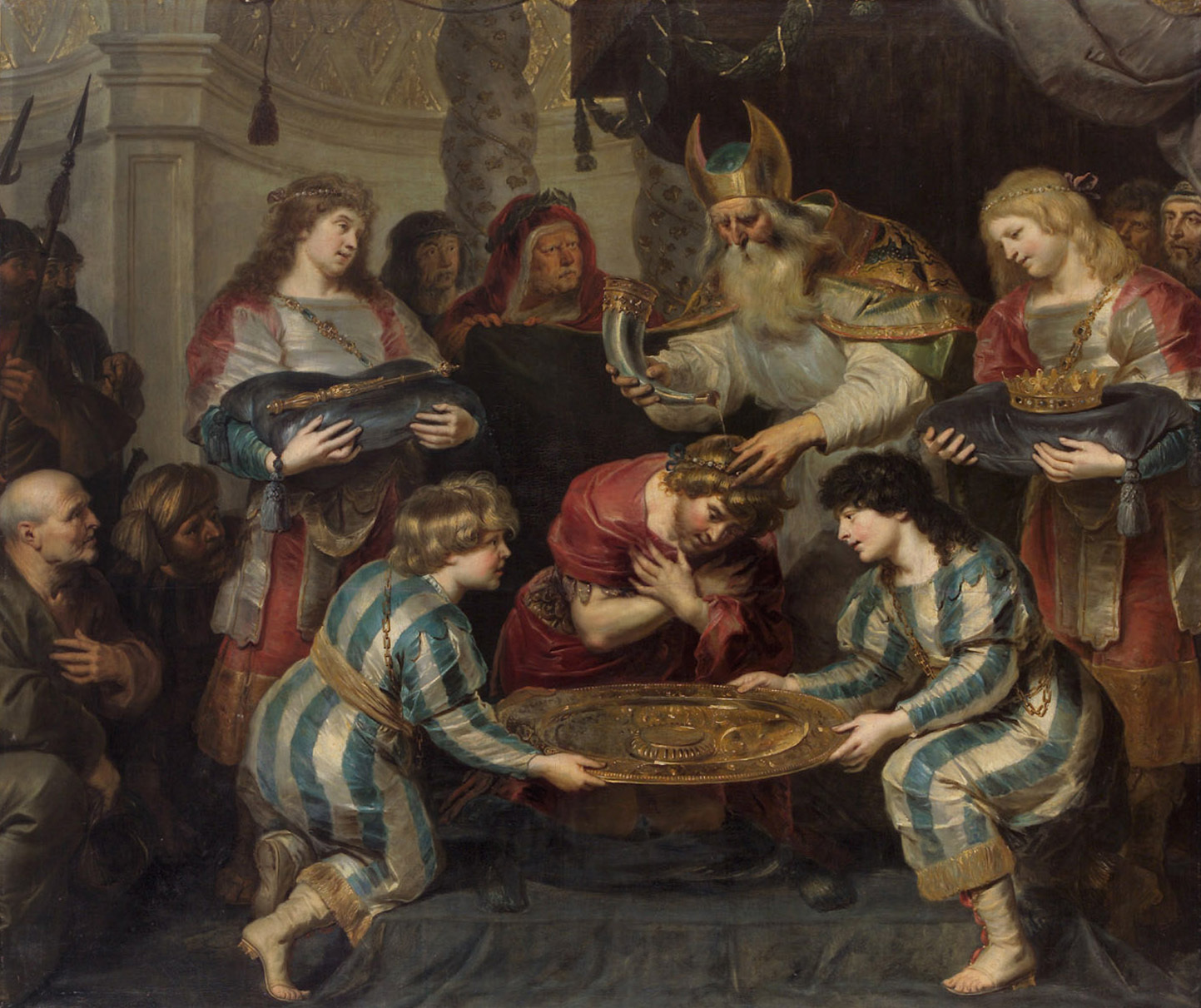
The Anointing of Solomon by Cornelis de Vos (c. 1630). According to 1 Kings 1:39, Solomon was anointed by Zadok.

According to the First Book of Kings, when David was old, "he could not get warm". "So they sought a beautiful young woman throughout all the territory of Israel, and found Abishag the Shunamite, and brought her to the king. The young woman was very beautiful, and she was of service to the king and attended to him, but the king knew her not."

While David was in this state, court factions were maneuvering for power. Adonijah, David's heir apparent, acted to have himself declared king, but was outmaneuvered by Bathsheba and the biblical prophet Nathan, who convinced David to proclaim Solomon king according to his earlier promise (not recorded elsewhere in the biblical narrative), despite Solomon's being younger than his brothers.

Solomon, as instructed by David, began his reign with an extensive purge, including his father's chief general, Joab, among others, and further consolidated his position by appointing friends throughout the administration, including in religious positions and in civic and military posts. It is said that Solomon ascended to the throne when he was only about fifteen.

Solomon greatly expanded his military strength, especially the cavalry and chariot arms. He founded numerous colonies, some of which doubled as trading posts and military outposts. He also increased the bureaucracy.

Trade relationships were a focus of his administration. In particular he continued his father's very profitable relationship with the Phoenician king Hiram I of Tyre (see 'wealth' below); they sent out joint expeditions to the lands of Tarshish and Ophir to engage in the trade of luxury products, importing gold, silver, sandalwood, pearls, ivory, apes, and peacocks. Solomon is considered the wealthiest Israelite king named in the Bible.

=== Wisdom ===
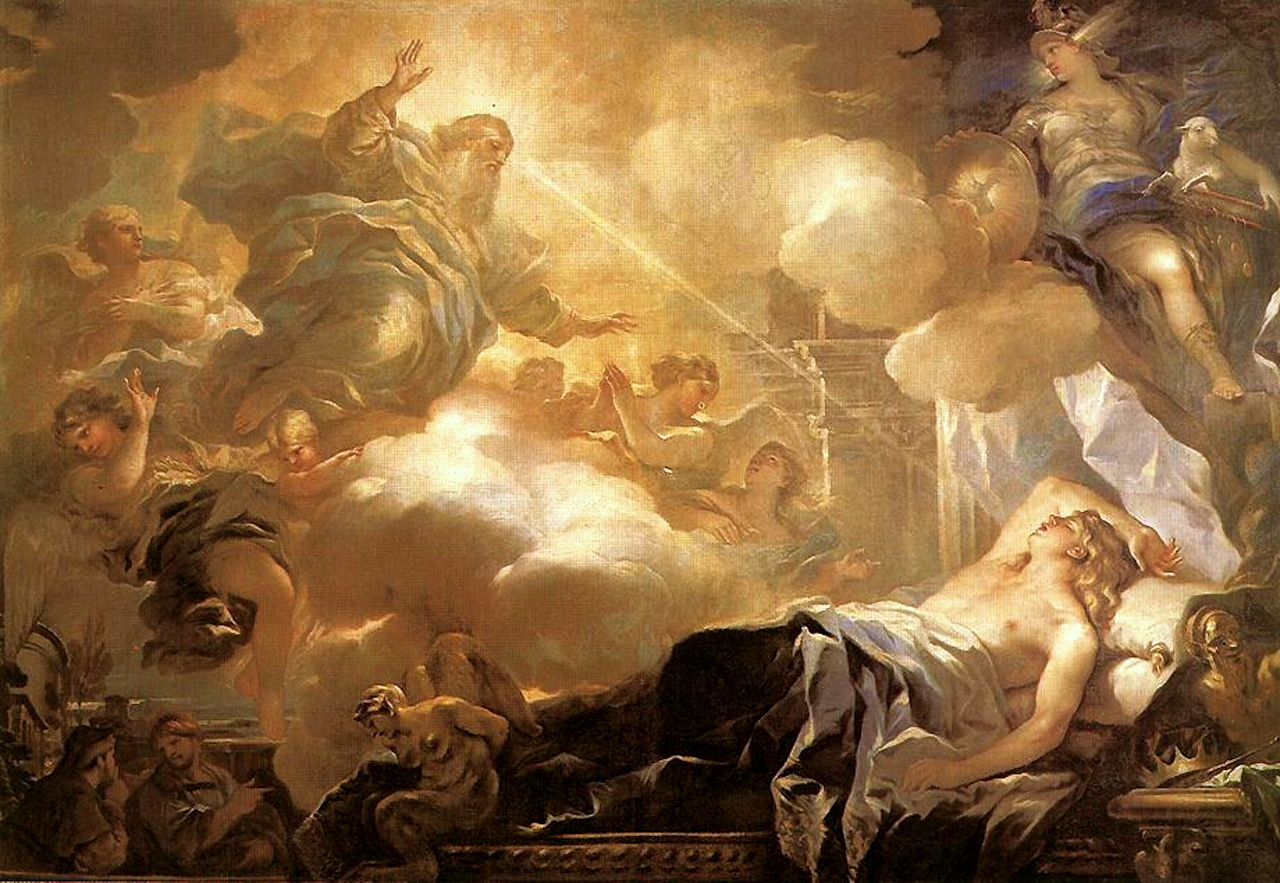
Luca Giordano: The Dream of Solomon: God promises Solomon wisdom.

Solomon was the biblical king most famous for his wisdom. In 1 Kings, he sacrificed to God, and God later appeared to him in a dream, asking what Solomon wanted from God. Solomon asked for wisdom in order to better rule and guide his people. Pleased, God personally answered Solomon's prayer, promising him great wisdom because he did not ask for self-serving rewards like long life or the death of his enemies.

Perhaps the best known story of his wisdom is the Judgement of Solomon; two women each lay claim to being the mother of the same child. Solomon easily resolved the dispute by commanding the child to be cut in half and shared between the two. One woman promptly renounced her claim, proving that she would rather give the child up than see it killed. Solomon declared the woman who showed compassion to be the true mother, entitled to the whole child.

Solomon has traditionally been considered the author of three biblical books: Proverbs, Ecclesiastes, and Song of Songs. He has also traditionally been ascribed authorship of the Book of Wisdom which is included among the deuterocanonical books recognized by the Catholic Church, Eastern Orthodox Church, Oriental Orthodox Churches, and Church of the East, but is considered apocryphal in Protestant traditions.

=== Wealth ===
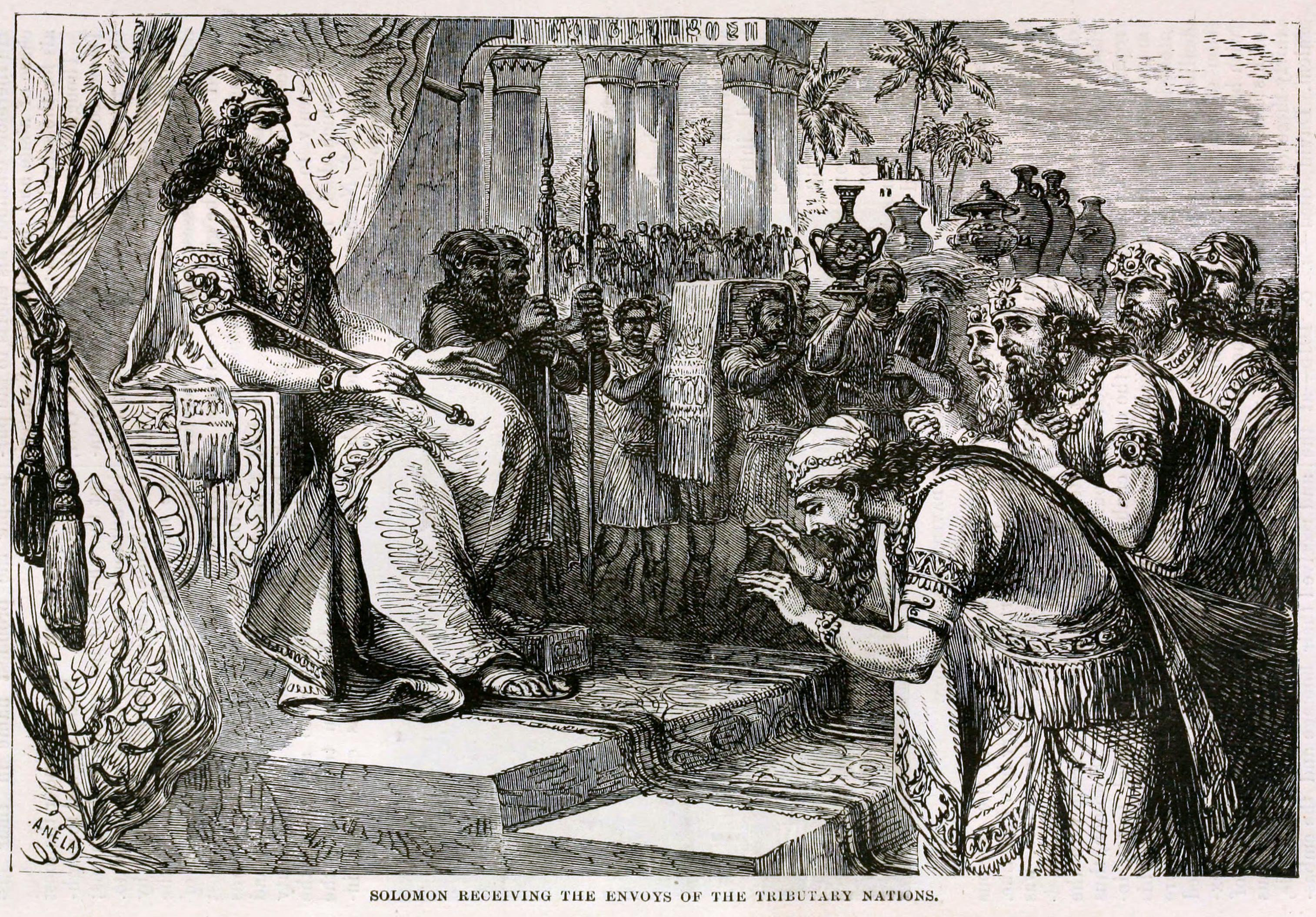
Solomon receiving envoys of the tributary nations

According to the Hebrew Bible, the ancient Kingdom of Israel reached its greatest splendour and wealth during Solomon's 40-year reign. In a single year, according to 1 Kings 10:14, Solomon collected tribute amounting to 666 talents (18,125 kilograms) of gold. Solomon is described as surrounding himself with all the luxuries and the grandeur of an Eastern monarch, and his government prospered. He allied with Hiram I, king of Tyre, who in many ways greatly assisted him in his numerous undertakings.

=== Construction projects ===
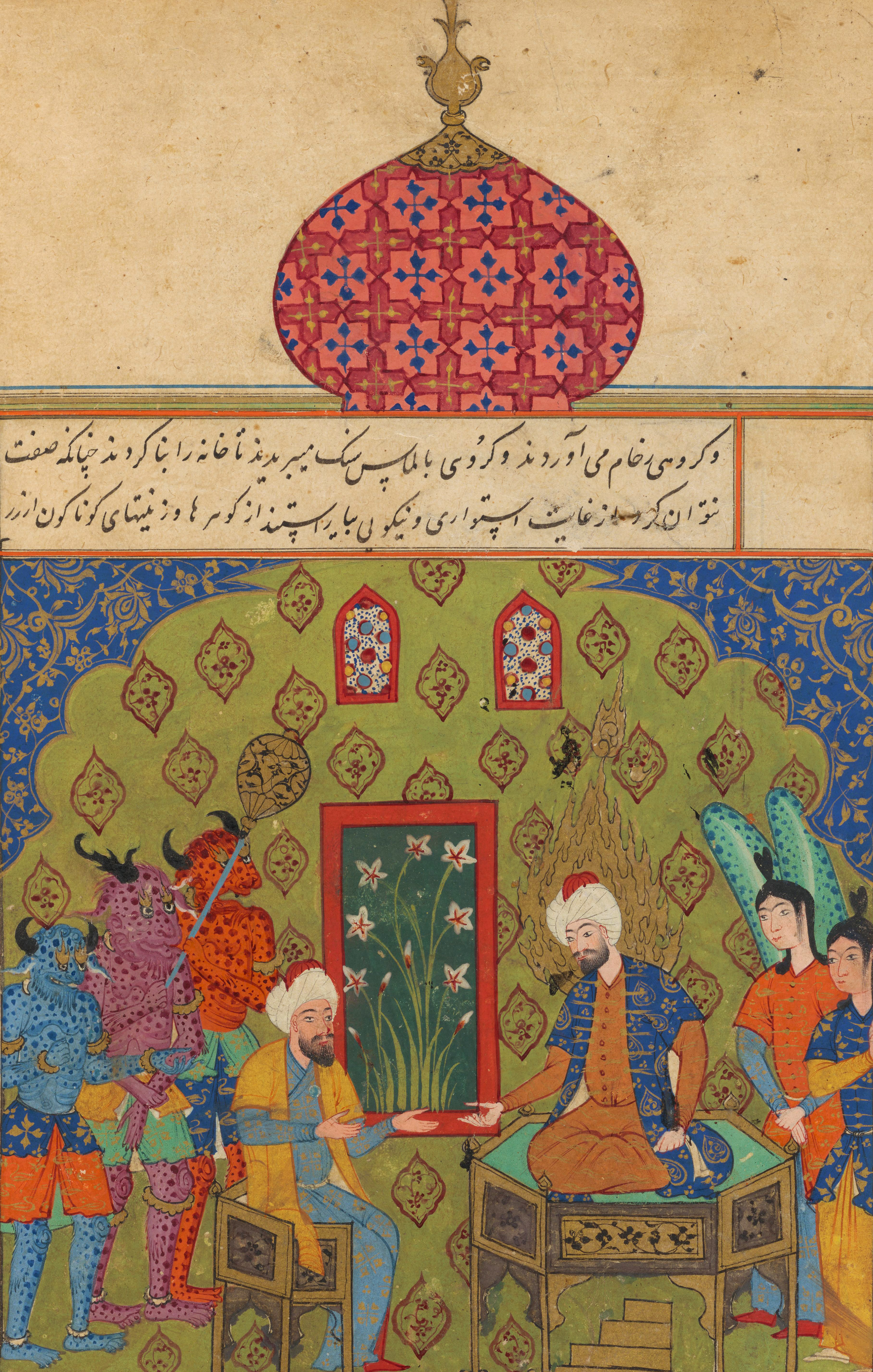
1580 Iranian illustration of Solomon discussing the plans for his temple with his architect; he is aided by jinn and angels.

For years before his death, David was engaged in collecting materials for building a temple in Jerusalem as a permanent home for Yahweh and the Ark of the Covenant. Solomon is described as undertaking the construction of the temple, with the help of an architect, also named Hiram, and other materials, sent from King Hiram of Tyre.

After the completion of the temple, Solomon is described in the biblical narrative as erecting many other important buildings in Jerusalem. For 13 years, he was engaged in the building of a royal palace on Ophel (a hilly promontory in central Jerusalem). This complex included buildings referred to as:

The House (or Hall) of the Forest of Lebanon
The Hall or Porch of Pillars
The Hall of the Throne or the Hall of Justice, as well as his own residence and a residence for his wife, Pharaoh's daughter.

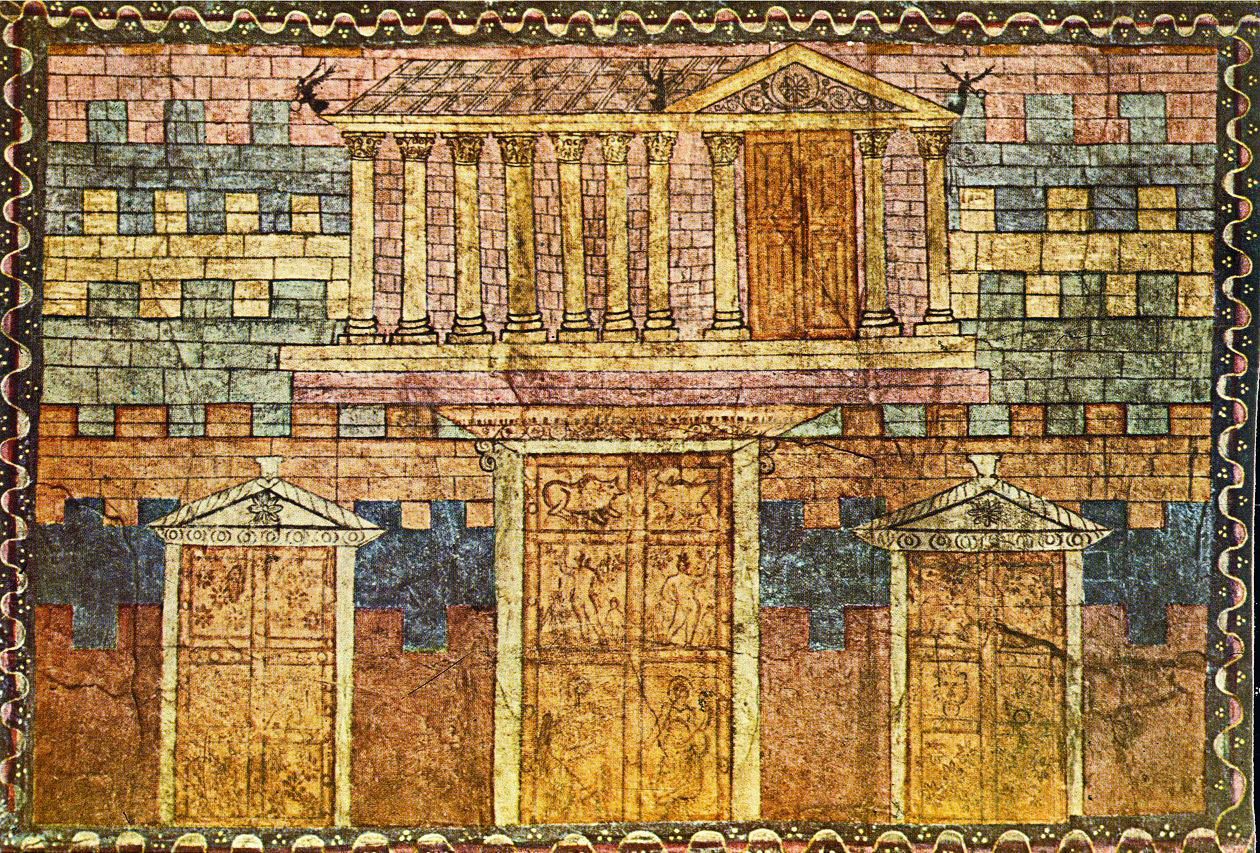
245–246 CE mural depicting Solomon's Temple in Jerusalem from the Dura-Europos synagogue

Solomon's throne is said to have been spectacularly opulent and possessed moving parts, making it one of the earliest mechanical devices in history. It is said that "Nothing like it (the throne) had ever been made for any other kingdom." Solomon also constructed great water works for the city, and the Millo (Septuagint, Acra) for the defense of the city. However, excavations in Jerusalem have uncovered no monumental architecture from the era, and no remains of the Temple or Solomon's palace have been found.

Solomon is also described as rebuilding cities elsewhere in Israel, creating the port of Ezion-Geber, and constructing Palmyra in the wilderness as a commercial depot and military outpost. Although the location of the port of Ezion-Geber is known, no remains have ever been found. More archaeological success has been achieved with the major cities Solomon is said to have strengthened or rebuilt, for example, Hazor, Megiddo, and Gezer. These all have substantial ancient remains, including impressive six-chambered gates, and ashlar palaces; however, it is no longer the scholarly consensus that these structures date to the time, according to the Bible, when Solomon ruled.

According to the Bible, during Solomon's reign, Israel enjoyed great commercial prosperity, with extensive traffic being carried on by land with Tyre, Egypt, and Arabia, and by sea with Tarshish, Ophir, and South India.

=== Wives and concubines ===
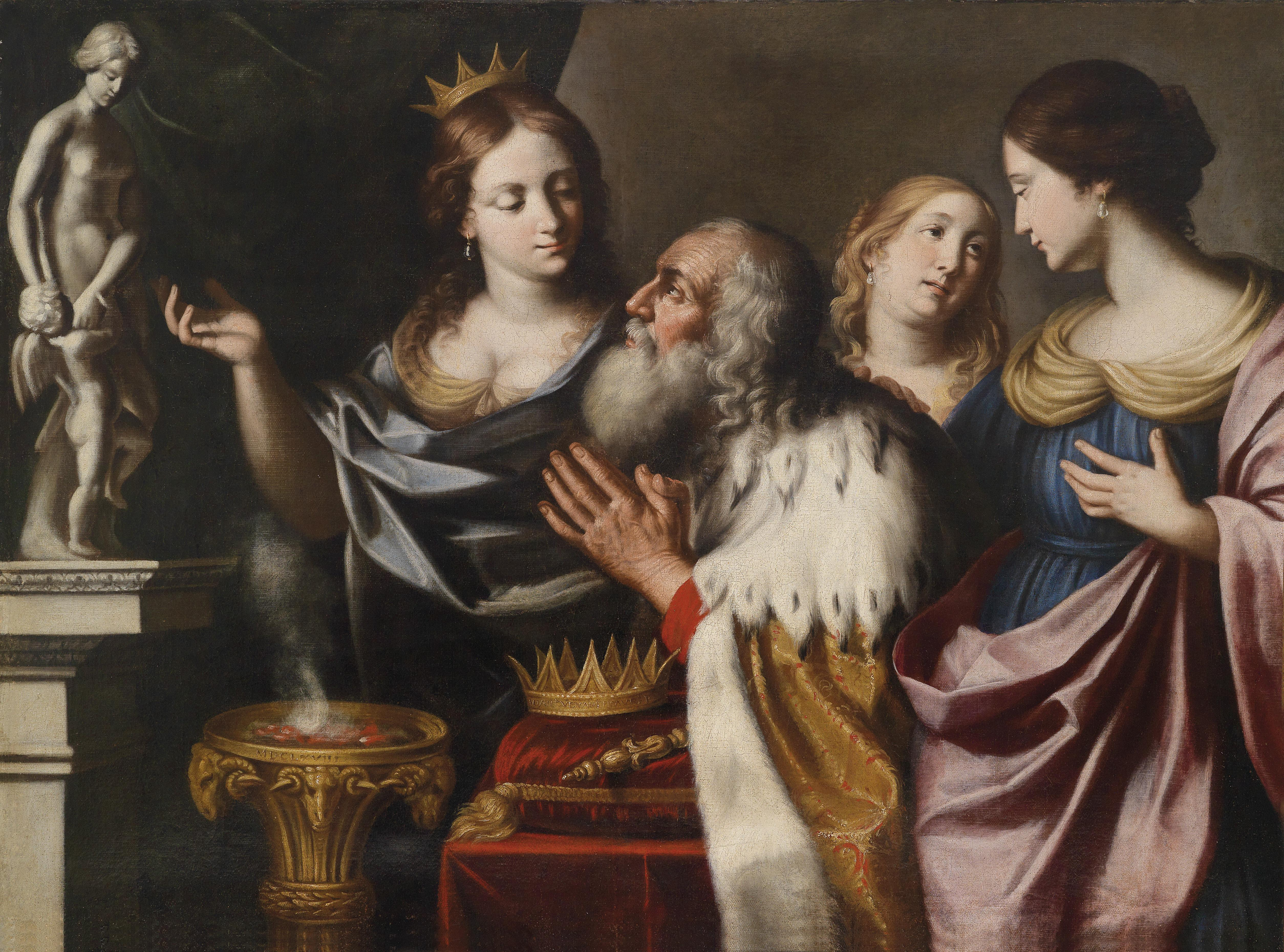
King Solomon with his wives. Illustrated in 1668 by Giovanni Battista Venanzi.

According to the biblical account, Solomon had 700 wives and 300 concubines. The wives were described as foreign princesses, including Pharaoh's daughter and women of Moab, Ammon, Edom, Sidon and of the Hittites. His marriage to Pharaoh's daughter appears to have cemented a political alliance with Egypt, whereas he clung to his other wives and concubines "in love". The only wife mentioned by name is Naamah the Ammonite, mother of Solomon's successor, Rehoboam.

The biblical narrative notes with disapproval that Solomon permitted his foreign wives to import their national deities, building temples to Ashtoreth and Milcom.

In the branch of literary analysis that examines the Bible, called higher criticism, the story of Solomon falling into idolatry by the influence of Pharaoh's daughter and his other foreign wives is "customarily seen as the handiwork of the 'deuteronomistic historian(s)'", who are held to have written, compiled, or edited texts to legitimize the reforms of Hezekiah's great-grandson, King Josiah, who reigned from about 641 to 609 BCE (over 280 years after Solomon's death according to Bible scholars). Scholarly consensus in this field holds that "Solomon's wives/women were introduced in the 'Josianic' (customarily Dtr) edition of Kings as a theological construct to blame the schism [between Judah and the Northern Kingdom of Israel] on his misdeeds".

=== Relationship with Queen of Sheba ===
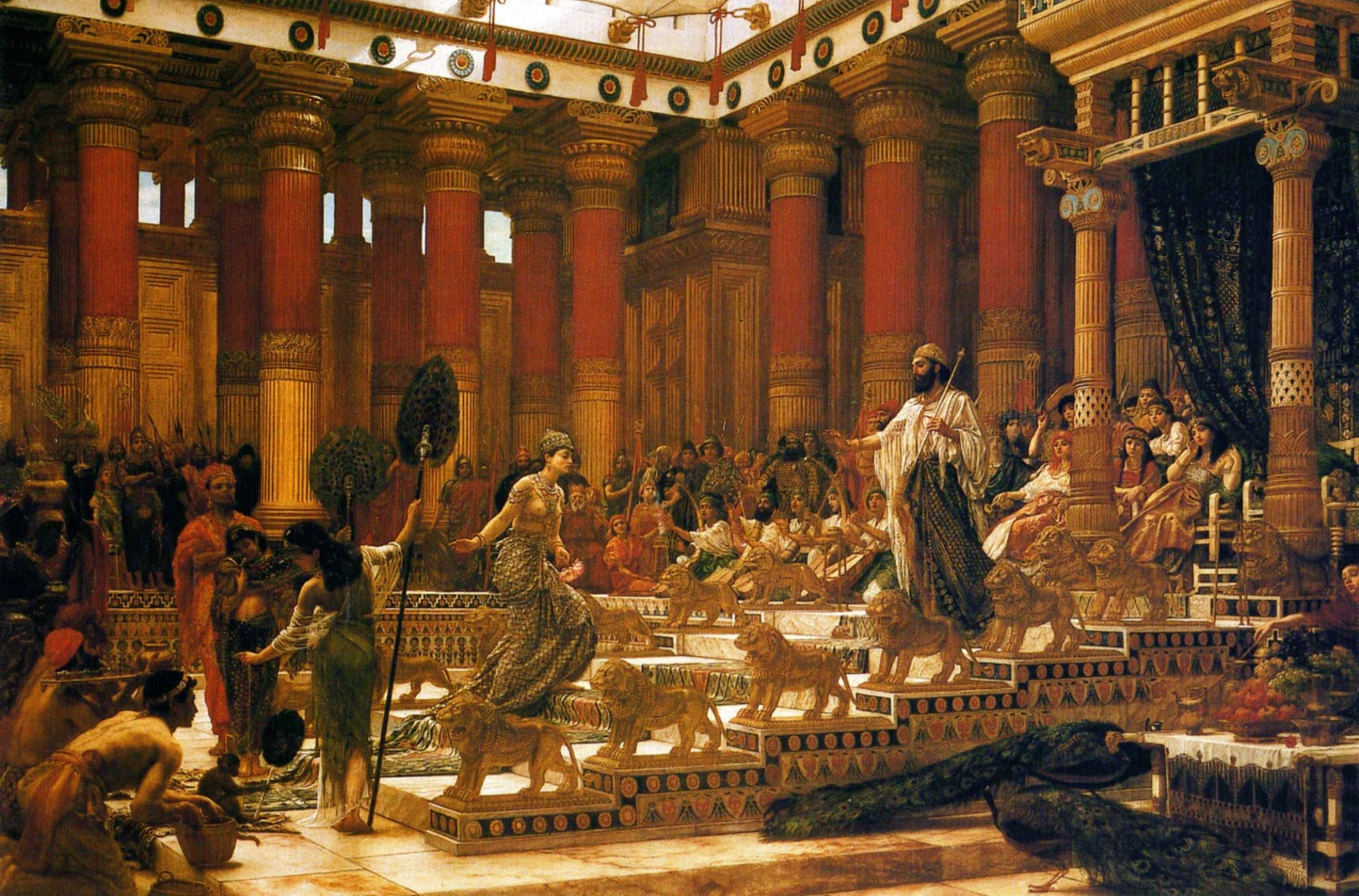
The Visit of the Queen of Sheba to King Solomon. Oil on canvas painting by Edward Poynter, 1890.

In a brief, unelaborated, and enigmatic passage, the Hebrew Bible describes how the fame of Solomon's wisdom and wealth reached even the far-off Queen of Sheba. The queen is described as visiting with gifts including gold, spices, and precious stones. When Solomon gave her "all her desire, whatsoever she asked", she left satisfied.

Whether the passage is simply to provide a brief foreign account of Solomon's wealth and wisdom, or whether the visit is meant to have greater significance, is unknown; nevertheless, the Queen of Sheba has become the subject of numerous stories.

Sheba is typically identified as Saba, a nation once spanning the Red Sea on the coasts of what are now Eritrea, Somalia, Ethiopia and Yemen, in Arabia Felix; although other sources place it in the area of what is now northern Ethiopia and Eritrea.

In a Rabbinical account (e.g. Targum Sheni, Colloquy of the Queen of Sheba), Solomon was accustomed to ordering animals to dance before him (a power granted by God), and upon summoning the mountain-cock or hoopoe (Aramaic name: nagar tura), the bird told him it had discovered a land in the east, rich in gold, silver, and plants, whose capital was called Kitor and whose ruler was the Queen of Sheba. Solomon then sent the bird to request the queen's visit.

An Ethiopian account from the 14th century (Kebra Nagast) maintains that the Queen of Sheba had sexual relations with King Solomon and gave birth beside the Mai Bella stream in the province of Hamasien, Eritrea. The Ethiopian tradition has a detailed account of the affair. The child was a son who became Menelik I, King of Axum, and founded a dynasty that would reign as the Jewish, then Christian, Empire of Ethiopia which lasted 2900 years until Haile Selassie was overthrown in 1974. Menelik was said to be a practicing Jew who was given a replica of the Ark of the Covenant by King Solomon; moreover, that the original Ark was switched and went to Axum with him and his mother, and is still there, guarded by a single dedicated priest.

The claim to such a lineage and to possession of the Ark was an important source of legitimacy and prestige for the Ethiopian monarchy throughout the centuries and had important and lasting effects on Ethiopian culture. The Ethiopian government and church deny all requests to view the alleged ark. (Note: Recent History Channel promotional production about Indiana Jones's positive impact on archaeology (released mid-May 2008, the week before the 22 May 2008 US release of Indiana Jones and the Kingdom of the Crystal Skull); History Channel producers were shown interviewing the guardian priest, and expert discussions about the Ark were part of the fare.)

Some classical-era Rabbis, attacking Solomon's moral character, have claimed instead that the child was an ancestor of Nebuchadnezzar II, who destroyed Solomon's temple some 300 years later.

=== Sins and punishment ===
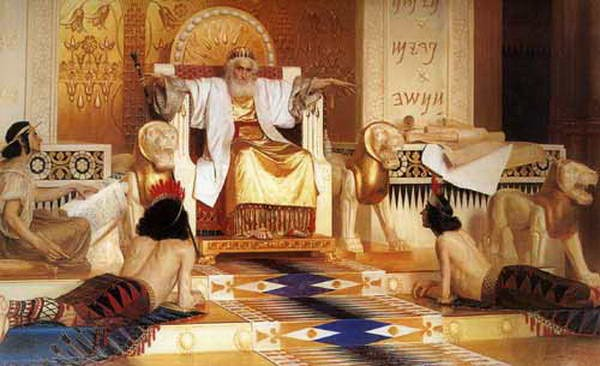
"Vanity of vanities; all is vanity". Isaak Asknaziy illustrates an old and meditative King Solomon.

Jewish scribes say that Solomon's teacher was Shimei ben Gera, and while he lived, he prevented Solomon from marrying foreign wives. The Talmud says in Ber. 8a: "For as long as Shimei the son of Gera was alive Solomon did not marry the daughter of Pharaoh" (see also Midrash Tehillim to Ps. 3:1). Solomon's execution of Shimei was his first descent into sin.

According to 1 Kings 11:4, Solomon's "wives turned his heart after other gods", their own national deities, to whom Solomon built temples, thus incurring divine anger and retribution in the form of the division of the kingdom after Solomon's death. 1 Kings 11 describes Solomon's descent into idolatry, particularly his turning after Ashtoreth, the goddess of the Sidonians, and after Milcom, the god of the Ammonites. In Deuteronomy 17:16-17, a king is commanded not to multiply horses or wives, nor greatly multiply to himself gold or silver. Solomon sinned in all three of these areas. In addition to his wives, he collected 666 talents of gold each year, a huge amount for a small nation like Israel. He gathered multitudes of horses and chariots from as far as Egypt, and as Deuteronomy warns, took Israel back to Egypt in spirit.

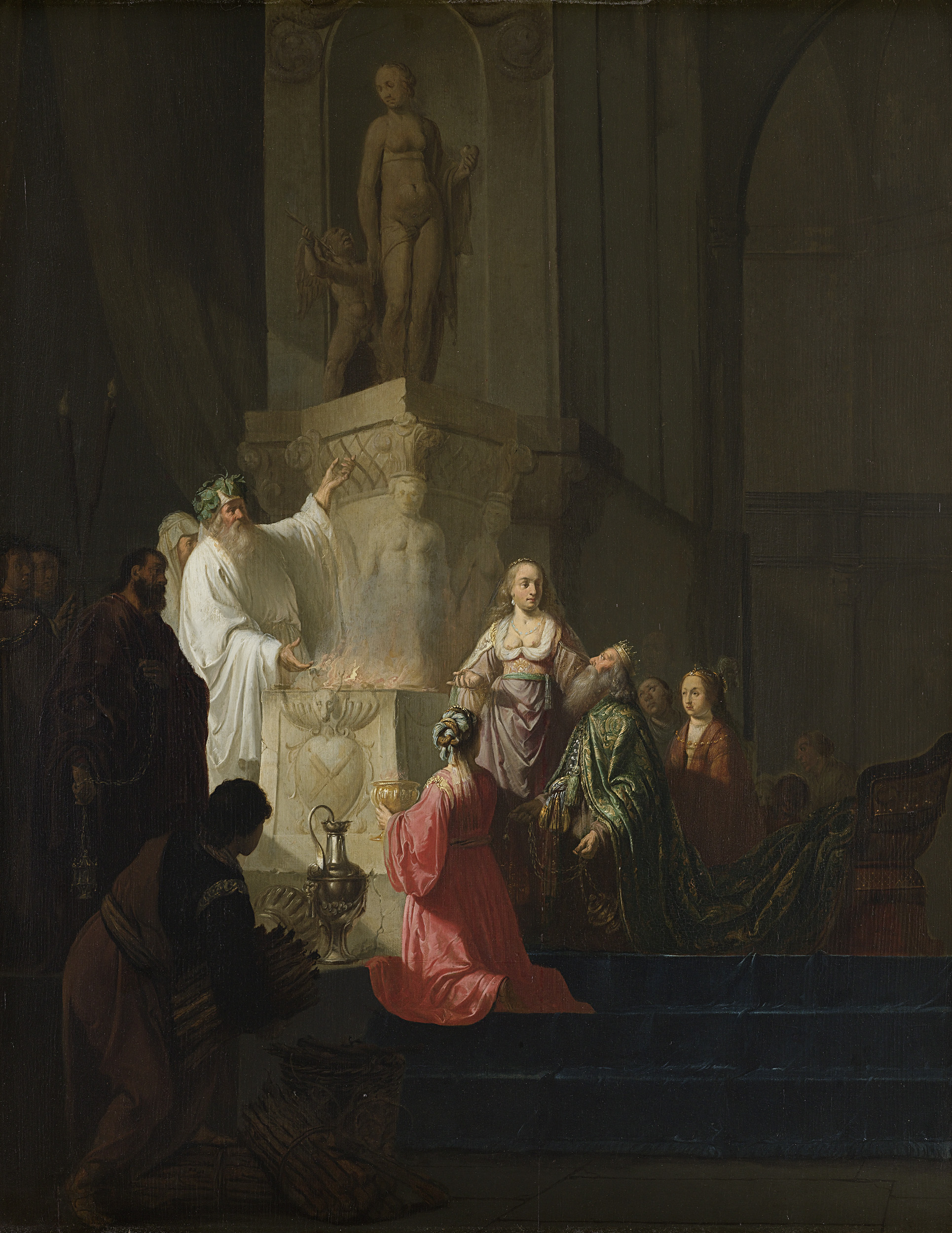
Solomon was said to have sinned by acquiring many foreign wives. Solomon's descent into idolatry, Willem de Poorter, Rijksmuseum.

According to 1 Kings 11:30–34 and 1 Kings 11:9-13, it was because of these sins that the Lord punished Solomon by removing most of the tribes of Israel from rule by Solomon's house.

And the Lord was angry with Solomon, because his heart had turned away from the Lord, the God of Israel, who had appeared to him twice and had commanded him concerning this thing, that he should not go after other gods. But he did not keep what the Lord commanded. Therefore the Lord said to Solomon, "Since this has been your practice and you have not kept my covenant and my statutes that I have commanded you, I will surely tear the kingdom from you and will give it to your servant. Yet for the sake of David your father I will not do it in your days, but I will tear it out of the hand of your son. However, I will not tear away all the kingdom, but I will give one tribe to your son, for the sake of David my servant and for the sake of Jerusalem that I have chosen.

=== Enemies ===
Near the end of his life, Solomon was beset by several enemies, including Hadad of Edom, Rezon of Zobah, and his own official Jeroboam of the tribe of Ephraim.

=== Death, succession of Rehoboam, and kingdom division ===
The United Monarchy breaks up—Jeroboam rules Israel (blue) and Rehoboam rules Judah.

King Solomon is a central biblical figure, who, according to the Hebrew Bible, was the builder of the First Temple in Jerusalem and the last ruler of the united Kingdom of Israel. After a reign of forty years (1 Kings 11:42), he died of natural causes, at around 55 years of age.

Upon Solomon's death, his son, Rehoboam, succeeded him, but ten of the Tribes of Israel refused him as king, splitting the monarchy into the northern Kingdom of Israel under Jeroboam, while Rehoboam continued to reign over the smaller southern Kingdom of Judah. Henceforth, the two kingdoms were never again united.

Solomon is associated with the peak "golden age" of the independent Kingdom of Israel and is a legendary source of judicial and religious wisdom.

According to Jewish tradition, King Solomon wrote three books of the Bible:

- Mishlei (Book of Proverbs), a collection of fables and wisdom of life.
- Kohelet (Ecclesiastes), a book of contemplation and self-reflection.
- Shir ha-Shirim (Song of Songs), a collection of erotic verse. The verse has been interpreted both literally (as describing a romantic and sexual relationship between a man and a woman) and metaphorically (as describing a relationship between God and his people).

The Hebrew word לשלמה appears in the title of two hymns (72 and 127) in the Psalms. This Hebrew word means "to Solomon", but it can also be translated as "by Solomon", thus suggesting to some that Solomon wrote the two psalms.

== Apocryphal or deuterocanonical texts ==
Rabbinical tradition attributes the Book of Wisdom (included within the Septuagint and recognized as part of a biblical canon by the Catholic Church, Eastern Orthodox Church, Oriental Orthodox Churches, and Church of the East) to Solomon, although this book was probably written in the 2nd century BCE. In this work, Solomon is portrayed as an astronomer. Other books of wisdom poetry such as the Odes of Solomon and the Psalms of Solomon also bear his name. The Jewish historian Eupolemus, who wrote about 157 BCE, included copies of apocryphal letters exchanged between Solomon and the kings of Egypt and Tyre.

The Gnostic Apocalypse of Adam, which may date to the 1st or 2nd century, refers to a legend in which Solomon sends out an army of demons to seek a virgin who had fled from him, perhaps the earliest surviving mention of the later common tale that Solomon controlled demons and made them his slaves. This tradition of Solomon's control over demons appears fully elaborated in the early pseudoepigraphical work called the Testament of Solomon with its elaborate and grotesque demonology.

== Historicity ==
As with most biblical personages in the middle era of Israelite society, the historicity of Solomon is hotly debated. Current consensus states that regardless of whether or not a man named Solomon truly reigned as king over the Judean hills in the tenth century BCE, the biblical description of his apparent empire's lavishness is almost surely an anachronistic exaggeration.

As for Solomon himself, scholars on both the maximalist and minimalist sides of the spectrum of biblical archeology generally agree that he probably existed. However, a historically accurate picture of the Davidic king is difficult to construct. According to some archaeologists, Solomon could have only been the monarch or chieftain of Judah, and that the northern kingdom was a separate development. Such positions have been criticized by other archaeologists and scholars, who argue that a united monarchy did exist in the 10th century BCE, while agreeing that the biblical account contains exaggerations.

=== Arguments against biblical description ===
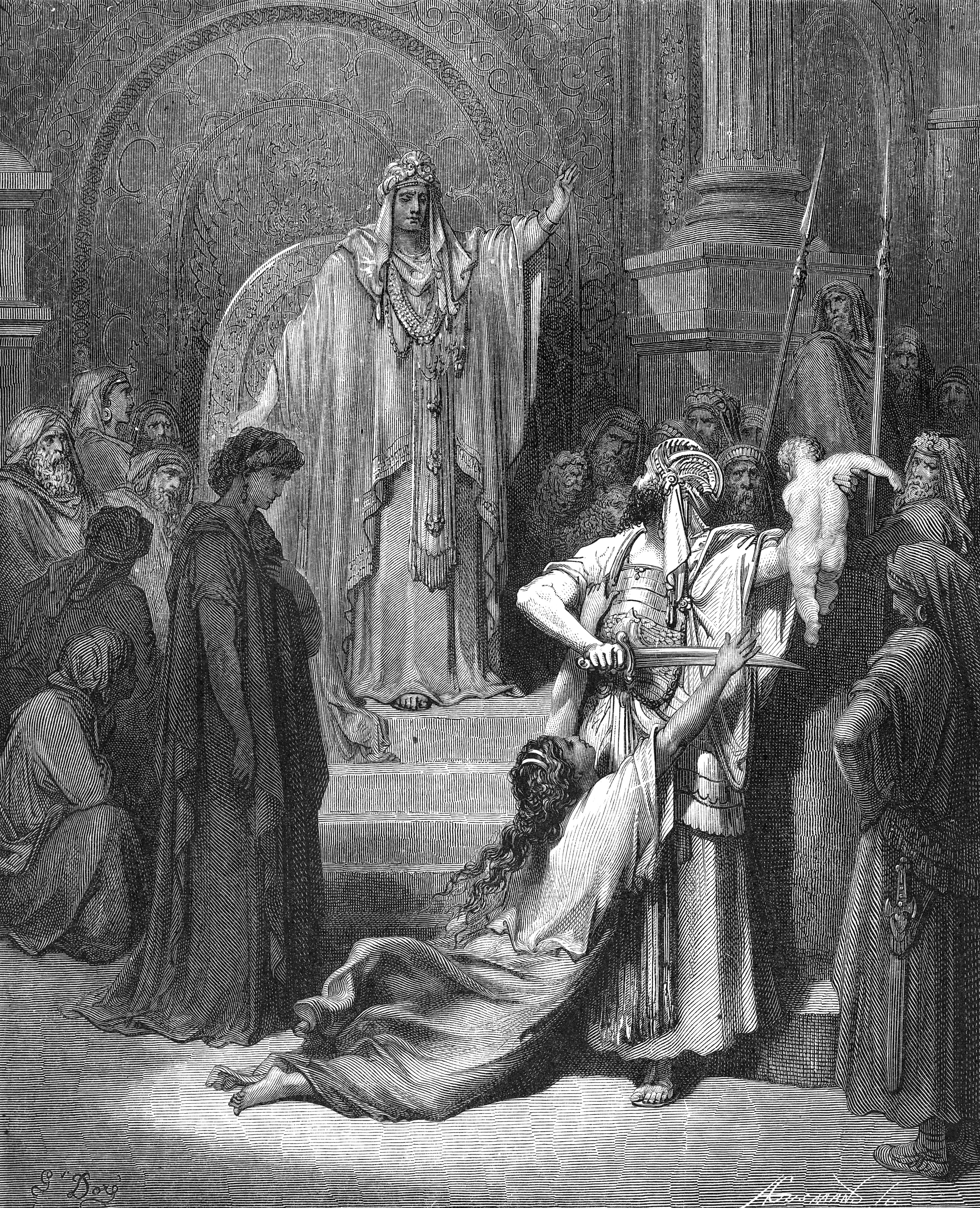
Judgement of Solomon. Engraving by Gustave Doré, 19th century.

Historical evidence of King Solomon other than the biblical accounts has been so minimal that some scholars have understood the period of his reign as a 'Dark Age' (Muhly 1998). The first-century Romano-Jewish scholar Josephus in Against Apion, citing Tyrian court records and Menander, gives a specific year during which King Hiram I of Tyre sent materials to Solomon for the construction of the Temple. However, no material evidence indisputably of Solomon's reign has been found. Yigael Yadin's excavations at Hazor, Megiddo, Beit Shean and Gezer uncovered structures that he and others have argued date from Solomon's reign, but others, such as Israel Finkelstein and Neil Silberman, argue that they should be dated to the Omride period, more than a century after Solomon.

According to Finkelstein and Silberman, authors of The Bible Unearthed: Archaeology's New Vision of Ancient Israel and the Origin of Its Sacred Texts, at the time of the kingdoms of David and Solomon, Jerusalem was populated by only a few hundred residents or less, which is insufficient for an empire stretching from the Euphrates to Eilath. According to The Bible Unearthed, archaeological evidence suggests that the kingdom of Israel at the time of Solomon was little more than a small city state, and so it is implausible that Solomon received tribute as large as 666 talents of gold per year. Although both Finkelstein and Silberman accept that David and Solomon were real inhabitants of Judah about the 10th century BCE, they claim that the earliest independent reference to the Kingdom of Israel is about 890 BCE, and for Judah about 750 BCE. They suggest that because of religious prejudice, the authors of the Bible suppressed the achievements of the Omrides (whom the Hebrew Bible describes as being polytheist), and instead pushed them back to a supposed golden age of Judaism and monotheists, and devotees of Yahweh. Some biblical minimalists like Thomas L. Thompson go further, arguing that Jerusalem became a city and capable of being a state capital only in the mid-7th century. Likewise, Finkelstein and others consider the claimed size of Solomon's temple implausible.

=== Arguments in favour of biblical description ===
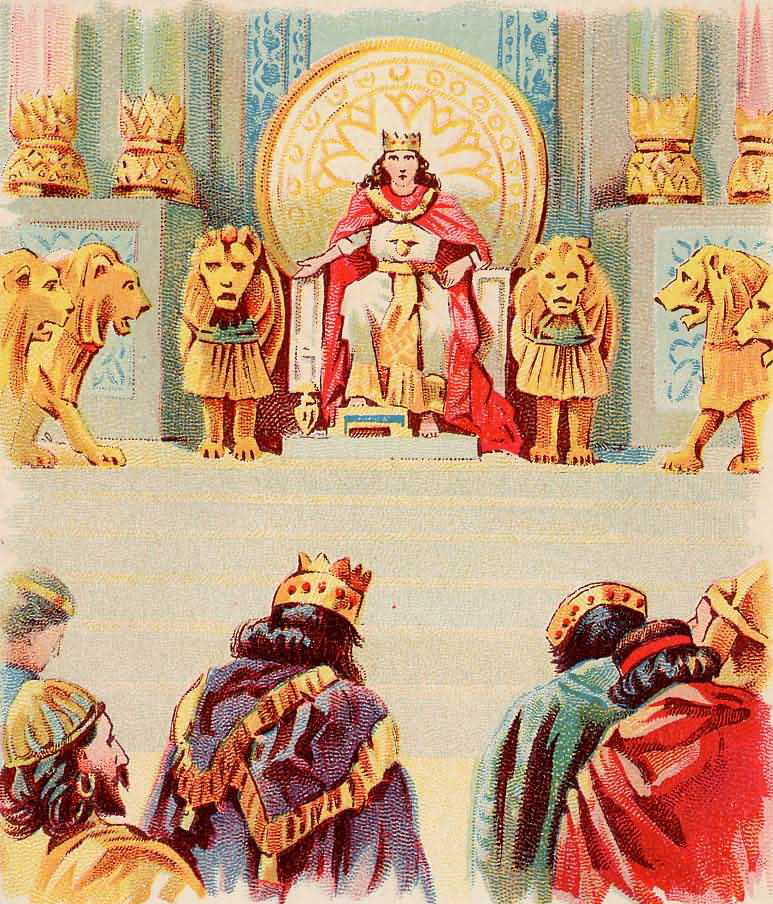
Solomon's Wealth and Wisdom, as in 1 Kings 3:12–13. Illustration from a 1896 Bible card.

André Lemaire states in Ancient Israel: From Abraham to the Roman Destruction of the Temple that the principal points of the biblical tradition of Solomon are generally trustworthy, although elsewhere he writes that he could find no substantiating archaeological evidence that supports the Queen of Sheba's visit to king Solomon, saying that the earliest records of trans-Arabian caravan voyages from Tayma and Sheba unto the Middle-Euphrates etc. occurred in the mid-8th century BCE, placing a possible visit from the Queen of Sheba to Jerusalem around this time—some 250 years later than the timeframe traditionally given for king Solomon's reign. Seventeen years later, traces of cinnamon were found in Phoenician clay flasks from three small sites in the Israeli coastal plain dating from the 10th century BCE. The authors suggested that trade routes with South Asia existed much earlier than previously thought.

Kenneth Kitchen argues that Solomon ruled over a comparatively wealthy "mini-empire", rather than a small city-state, and considers 666 gold talents a modest amount of money. Kitchen calculates that over 30 years, such a kingdom might have accumulated up to 500 tons of gold, which is small compared to other examples, such as the 1,180 tons of gold that Alexander the Great took from Susa. Similarly, Kitchen and others consider the temple of Solomon a reasonable and typically sized structure for the region at the time. Dever states "that we now have direct Bronze and Iron Age parallels for every feature of the 'Solomonic temple' as described in the Hebrew Bible".

=== Middle way ===
Some scholars have charted a middle path between minimalist scholars like Finkelstein, Silberman, and Philip Davies (who believes that "Solomon is a totally invented character") and maximalist scholars like Lemaire and Kitchen. For instance, the archaeologist Avraham Faust has argued that biblical depictions of Solomon date to later periods and do overstate his wealth, buildings, and kingdom, but that Solomon did have an acropolis and ruled over a polity larger than Jerusalem. In particular, his archaeological research in regions near Jerusalem, like Sharon, finds commerce too great not to be supported by a polity and such regions probably were ruled loosely by Jerusalem. Scholars like Lester Grabbe also believe that there must have been a ruler in Jerusalem during this period and that he likely built a temple, although the town was quite small. William G. Dever argues that Solomon only reigned over Israel and did build a temple, but that descriptions of his lavishness and the other conquests are strongly exaggerated.

=== Archaeology ===
==== Clay bullae seals ====
In 2014, professor of anthropology James W. "Jimmy" Hardin and his team from the Cobb Institute of Archaeology at Mississippi State University discovered six official clay bullae seals at a site east of Gaza called Khirbet Summeily. He states that these bullae are associated with an Iron Age IIA political entity typified by elite activities dated to the 10th century BCE. The bullae appear to be the only known examples that date to this period. In his view, this lends general support to the historical veracity of David and Solomon as recorded in the Hebrew biblical texts.

==== Temple Mount in Jerusalem ====
Little archaeological excavation has been done around the area known as the Temple Mount, in what is thought to be the foundation of Solomon's Temple, because attempts to do so are met with protests by Muslim authorities of the Jerusalem Waqf.

==== Precious metals from Tarshish ====
The biblical passages that understand Tarshish as a source of King Solomon's great wealth in metals—especially silver, but also gold, tin and iron (Ezekiel 27)—were linked to archaeological evidence from silver-hoards found in Phoenicia in 2013. The metals from Tarshish were reportedly obtained by Solomon in partnership with King Hiram of Phoenician Tyre (Isaiah 23) and the fleets of Tarshish and ships that sailed in their service. The silver hoards provide the first recognized material evidence that agrees with the ancient texts concerning Solomon's kingdom and his wealth (see 'Wealth' above).

Possible evidence for the described wealth of Solomon and his kingdom was discovered in ancient silver hoards, which were found in Israel and Phoenicia and recognized for their importance in 2003. The evidence from the hoards shows that the Levant was a center of wealth in precious metals during the reigns of Solomon and Hiram, and matches the texts that say the trade extended from Asia to the Atlantic Ocean.

==== Cabul ====
The distribution of fortified cities between Phoenicia and Galilee in Iron Age IIA (10th-9th century BCE) provides context on Solomon's sale of territory to Hiram, which he derided as Cabul (i.e. "good for nothing"). Kyle H. Keimer argues that they reflected Solomon's apathy to the tribe of Asher, who lived in Phoenicia, or his strategic thinking, where these cities served as defense barriers against foreign invasions. When it came to national defense, Near Eastern states did not rely on walls. Instead, they guarded resources, which they prioritized over the people. In addition, it revealed Solomon's political upper hand over Hiram. These events were subsequently preserved in sources, which a Deuteronomistic historian relied on when writing 1 Kings 9:11-14.

=== Biblical criticism: Solomon's religiosity ===
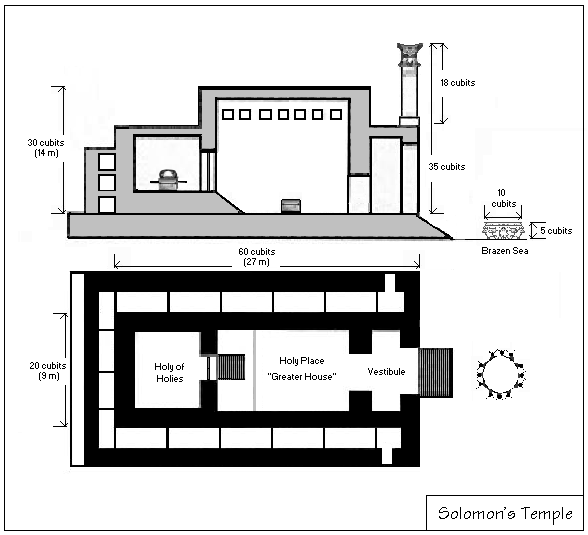
A sketch of Solomon's Temple, based on descriptions in the Scriptures

From a critical point of view, Solomon's building of a temple for Yahweh should not be considered an act of particular devotion to Yahweh because Solomon is also described as building places of worship for a number of other deities. Some scholars and historians argue that the passages, such as his dedication prayer (1 Kings 8:14–66), that describe Solomon's apparent initial devotion to Yahweh were written much later, after Jerusalem had become the religious centre of the kingdom, replacing locations such as Shiloh and Bethel. Earlier historians maintain that there is evidence that these passages in Kings are derived from official court records at the time of Solomon and from other writings of that time that were incorporated into the canonical books of Kings. More recent scholars believe that passages such as these in the Books of Kings were not written by the same authors who wrote the rest of the text, instead probably by the Deuteronomist.

== Religious views ==
=== Judaism ===
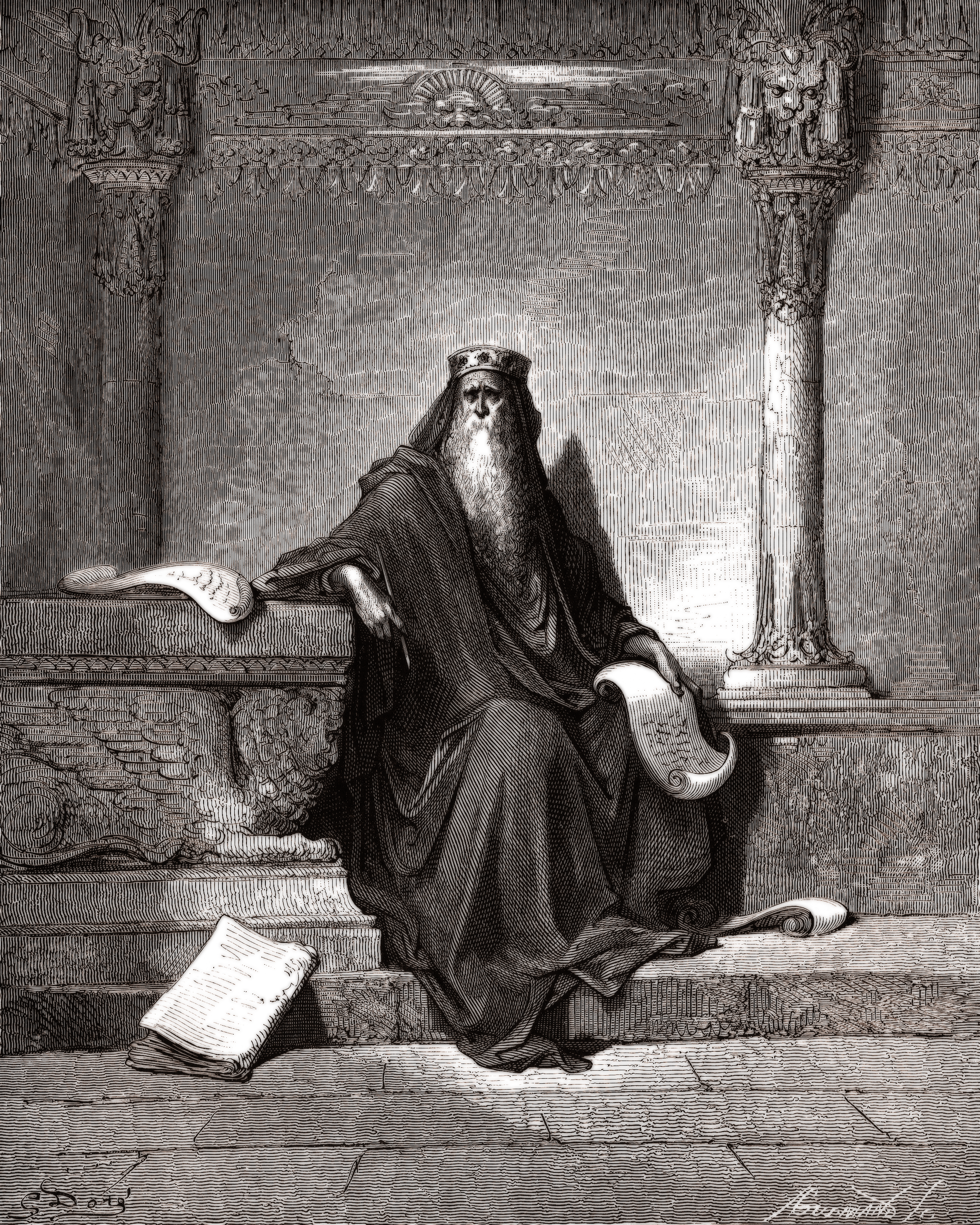
Solomon writing Proverbs (Gustave Doré)

King Solomon sinned by acquiring many foreign wives and horses because he thought he knew the reason for the biblical prohibition and thought it did not apply to him. When King Solomon married Pharaoh's daughter, a sandbank formed which eventually formed the "great nation of Rome"—the nation that destroyed Herod's Temple. Solomon gradually lost more and more prestige until he became like a commoner. Some say he regained his status while others say he did not. In the end, however, he is regarded as a righteous king and is especially praised for his diligence in building the Temple.

Adin Steinsaltz reads Solomon's wisdom as realpolitik. His geopolitical success possible only by paying lip service to idolatrous practices without actually believing in them. This set a terrible example for his subjects. Solomon assumed incorrectly that ordinary people would be as wise as himself and keep idolatry at arm's length.

King Josiah was also said to have had the Ark of the Covenant, Aaron's rod, vial of manna and the anointing oil placed within a hidden chamber which had been built by Solomon.

The Seder Olam Rabbah holds that Solomon's reign was not in 1000 BCE, but rather in the ninth century BCE, during which time he built the First Temple in 832 BCE. However, The Jewish Encyclopedia of 1906 gives the more common date of "971 to 931 BCE".

=== Christianity ===
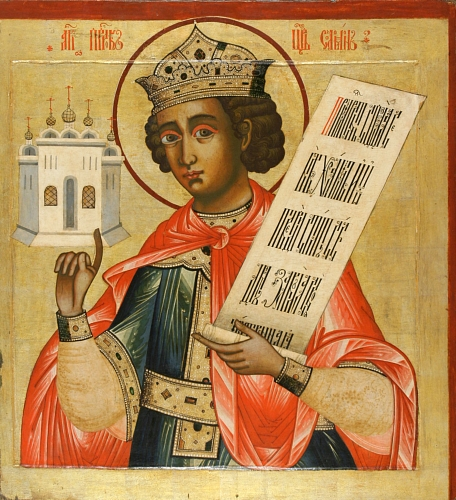
Russian icon of King Solomon holding a model of the Temple (18th century, iconostasis of Kizhi monastery, Russia)

Christianity has traditionally accepted the historical existence of Solomon, though some modern Christian scholars have also questioned at least his authorship of those biblical texts ascribed to him. Such disputes tend to divide Christians into traditionalist and modernist camps.

Of the two genealogies of Jesus given in the Gospels, Matthew mentions Solomon, but Luke does not. Some commentators see this as an issue that can be reconciled while others disagree. For instance, it has been suggested that Matthew is using Joseph's genealogy and Luke is using Mary's, but Darrell Bock states that this would be unprecedented, "especially when no other single woman appears in the line". Other suggestions include the use by one of the royal and the other of the natural line, one using the legal line and the other the physical line, or that Joseph was adopted.

Jesus refers to Solomon, using him for comparison in his admonition against worrying about life. This account is recorded in Matthew 6:29 and the parallel passage in Luke 12:27.

In the Eastern Orthodox Church, Solomon is commemorated as a saint, with the title of "Righteous Prophet and King". His feast day is celebrated on the Sunday of the Holy Forefathers (two Sundays before the Great Feast of the Nativity of the Lord).

The staunchly Catholic King Philip II of Spain sought to model himself after King Solomon. Statues of King David and Solomon stand on either side of the entrance to the basilica of El Escorial, Philip's palace, and Solomon is also depicted in a great fresco at the center of El Escorial's library. Philip identified the warrior-king David with his own father Charles V, and himself sought to emulate the thoughtful and logical character which he perceived in Solomon. Moreover, the structure of the Escorial was inspired by that of Solomon's Temple.

=== Islam ===
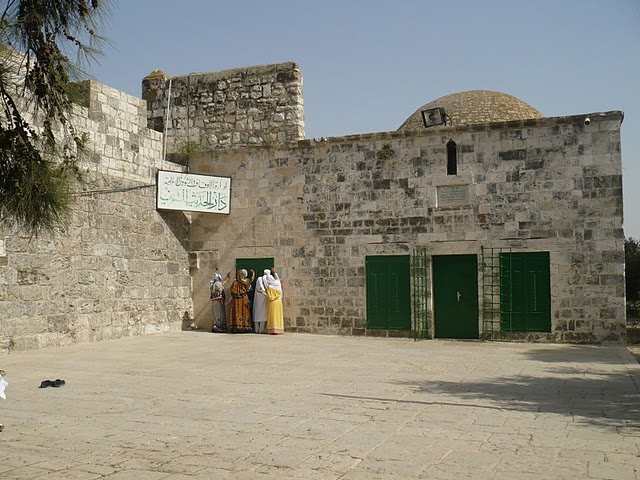
Throne of Solomon, Aqsa Mosque compound, Jerusalem

In Islam, Solomon is also known as Sulaimān ibn Dāwūd, and is considered a prophet and a messenger of God, as well as a divinely appointed monarch. Solomon inherited his position from his father as the prophetic King of the Israelites. Unlike in the Bible, according to Muslim tradition Solomon never participated in idolatry.

The Quran ascribes to Solomon a great level of wisdom, knowledge and power. He knew the language of the birds (Arabic: منطق الطير, romanized: manṭiq al-ṭayr).

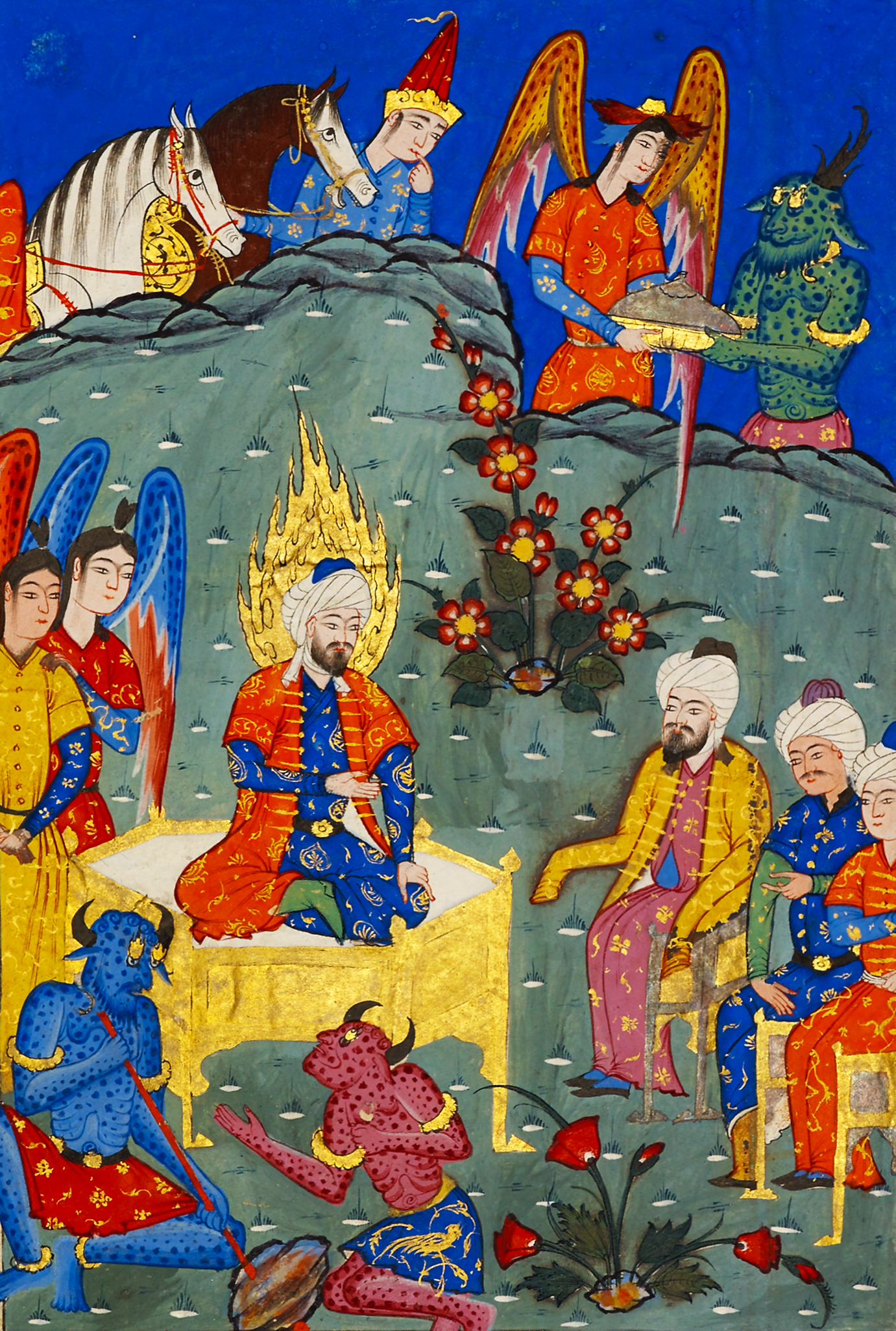
Islamic miniature of Sulayman holding court on his golden throne. Men, angels, and divs serve him.

Solomon was also known in Islam to have other supernatural abilities bestowed upon him by God, like controlling the wind, ruling over the jinn, enslaving divs, and hearing the communication of ants:

And to Solomon ˹We subjected˺ the wind: its morning stride was a month's journey and so was its evening stride. And We caused a stream of molten copper to flow for him, and ˹We subjected˺ some of the jinn to work under him by his Lord's Will. And whoever of them deviated from Our command, We made them taste the torment of the blaze.

— Surah Saba 34:12

And when they came across a valley of ants, an ant warned, "O ants! Go quickly into your homes so Solomon and his armies do not crush you, unknowingly."

— Surah An-Naml 27:18-19

The Quran says:

They ˹instead˺ followed the magic promoted by the devils during the reign of Solomon. Never did Solomon disbelieve, rather the devils disbelieved. They taught magic to the people, along with what had been revealed to the two angels, Hârût and Mârût, in Babylon. The two angels never taught anyone without saying, "We are only a test ˹for you˺, so do not abandon ˹your˺ faith." Yet people learned ˹magic˺ that caused a rift ˹even˺ between husband and wife; although their magic could not harm anyone except by Allah's Will. They learned what harmed them and did not benefit them—although they already knew that whoever buys into magic would have no share in the Hereafter. Miserable indeed was the price for which they sold their souls, if only they knew!

— Surah Al-Baqarah 2:102

Solomon's gifts are often used allegorically in popular literature. The demons taking over Solomon's kingdom mirrors the Sufi concept of the mind giving in to evil urges. The ant is depicted as a wise creature, revealing to Solomon the reason behind his gift to control the wind and his name.

During the Islamization of Iran, Solomon became merged with Jamshid, a great king from Persian mythology, to whom similar attributes are ascribed.

=== Baháʼí Faith ===
In the Baháʼí Faith, Solomon is regarded as one of the lesser prophets along with David, Isaiah, Jeremiah, Ezekiel, along with others. Baháʼís see Solomon as a prophet who was sent by God to address the issues of his time. Baha'ullah wrote about Solomon in the Hidden Words. He also mentions Solomon in the Tablet of Wisdom, where he is depicted as a contemporary of Pythagoras.

=== Druze faith ===
In the Druze faith, Solomon had the ability to speak to animals and plants and was well respected in the natural world. According to Druze tradition, when Solomon died, all the trees shed their leaves in mourning, except for the olive tree, which continued to bear fruit to honor Solomon's memory.

== Legends ==
=== One Thousand and One Nights ===
A well-known story in the collection One Thousand and One Nights describes a genie who had displeased King Solomon and was punished by being locked in a bottle and thrown into the sea. Since the bottle was sealed with Solomon's seal, the genie was helpless to free himself, until he was freed many centuries later by a fisherman who discovered the bottle. In other stories from the One Thousand and One Nights, protagonists who had to leave their homeland and travel to the unknown places of the world saw signs which proved that Solomon had already been there. Sometimes, protagonists discovered words of Solomon that were intended to help those who were lost and had unluckily reached those forbidden and deserted places.

=== Magic ===
According to Rabbinic literature, on account of his modest request for wisdom only, Solomon was rewarded with riches and an unprecedented glorious realm, which extended over the upper world inhabited by the angels and over the whole of the terrestrial globe with all its inhabitants, including all the beasts, fowl, and reptiles, as well as the demons and spirits. His control over the demons, spirits, and animals augmented his splendor, the demons bringing him precious stones, besides water from distant countries to irrigate his exotic plants. The beasts and fowl of their own accord entered the kitchen of Solomon's palace, so that they might be used as food for him, and extravagant meals for him were prepared daily by each of his 700 wives and 300 concubines, with the thought that perhaps the king would feast that day in her house.

==== Seal of Solomon ====
The Seal of Solomon is the legendary signet ring attributed to Solomon in medieval mystical traditions, from which it developed in parallel within Jewish mysticism, Islamic mysticism and Western occultism. It is the predecessor to the Star of David, the contemporary cultural and religious symbol of the Jewish people. It was often depicted in the shape of either a pentagram or a hexagram. In religious lore, the ring is described as having given Solomon the power to command the supernatural and also the ability to speak with animals. Due to the proverbial wisdom of Solomon, it came to be seen as an amulet or talisman, or a symbol or character in medieval magic and Renaissance magic, occultism, and alchemy.

==== Solomon and Asmodeus ====
One legend concerning Asmodeus (see: The Story of King Solomon and Ashmedai) goes on to state that Solomon one day asked Asmodeus what could make demons powerful over man, and Asmodeus asked to be freed and given the ring so that he could demonstrate; Solomon agreed but Asmodeus threw the ring into the sea and it was swallowed by a fish. Asmodeus then swallowed the king, stood up fully with one wing touching heaven and the other earth, and spat out Solomon to a distance of 400 miles. The Rabbis claim this was a divine punishment for Solomon's having failed to follow three divine commands, and Solomon was forced to wander from city to city, until he eventually arrived in an Ammonite city where he was forced to work in the king's kitchens. Solomon gained a chance to prepare a meal for the Ammonite king, which the king found so impressive that the previous cook was sacked and Solomon put in his place; the king's daughter, Naamah, subsequently fell in love with Solomon, but the family (thinking Solomon a commoner) disapproved, so the king decided to kill them both by sending them into the desert. Solomon and the king's daughter wandered the desert until they reached a coastal city, where they bought a fish to eat, which just happened to be the one which had swallowed the magic ring. Solomon was then able to regain his throne and expel Asmodeus. The element of a ring thrown into the sea and found back in a fish's belly also appeared in Herodotus' account of Polycrates, the tyrant of Samos (c. 538–522 BCE).

In another familiar version of the legend of the Seal of Solomon, Asmodeus disguises himself. In some myths, he's disguised as King Solomon himself. The concealed Asmodeus tells travelers who have ventured up to King Solomon's grand lofty palace that the Seal of Solomon was thrown into the sea. He then convinces them to plunge in and attempt to retrieve it, for if they do they would take the throne as king.

==== Artifacts ====
Other magical items attributed to Solomon are his key and his Table. The latter was said to be held in Toledo in Visigothic Spain and was part of the loot taken by Tariq ibn Ziyad during the Muslim conquest of Spain according to ibn Abd al-Hakam's History of the Conquest of Spain. The former appears in the title of The Lesser Key of Solomon, a Christian grimoire whose framing story is Solomon capturing demons using his ring, and forcing them to explain themselves to him.

In The Book of Deadly Names, purportedly translated from Arabic manuscripts found hidden in a building in Spain, the "King of the Jinn" Fiqiṭush brings 72 jinn before King Solomon to confess their corruptions and places of residence. Fiqitush tells King Solomon the recipes for curing such corruptions as each evil jinn confesses.

==== Angels ====
Angels also helped Solomon in building the Temple, though not by choice. The edifice was, according to rabbinical legend, miraculously constructed throughout, the large heavy stones rising and settling in their respective places of themselves. The general opinion of the Rabbis is that Solomon hewed the stones by means of a shamir, a mythical worm whose mere touch cleft rocks. According to Midrash Tehillim, the shamir was brought from paradise by Solomon's eagle; but most of the rabbis state that Solomon was informed of the worm's haunts by Asmodeus. The shamir had been entrusted by the prince of the sea to the mountain rooster alone, and the rooster had sworn to guard it well, but Solomon's men found the bird's nest, and covered it with glass. When the bird returned, it used the shamir to break the glass, whereupon the men scared the bird, causing it to drop the worm, which the men could then bring to Solomon.

==== In Kabbalah ====
Early adherents of Kabbalah portray Solomon as having sailed through the air on a throne of light placed on an eagle, which brought him near the heavenly gates as well as to the dark mountains behind which the fallen angels Uzza and Azzazel were chained; the eagle would rest on the chains, and Solomon, using the magic ring, would compel the two angels to reveal every mystery he desired to know.

==== The palace without entrance ====
According to one legend, while traveling magically, Solomon noticed a magnificent palace to which there appeared to be no entrance. He ordered the demons to climb to the roof and see if they could discover any living being within the building but they found only an eagle, which said that it was 700 years old, but that it had never seen an entrance. An elder brother of the eagle, 900 years old, was then found, but it also did not know the entrance. The eldest brother of these two birds, which was 1,300 years old, then declared it had been informed by its father that the door was on the west side, but that it had become hidden by sand drifted by the wind. Having discovered the entrance, Solomon found an idol inside that had in its mouth a silver tablet saying in Greek (a language not thought by modern scholars to have existed 1000 years before the time of Solomon) that the statue was of Shaddad, the son of 'Ad, and that it had reigned over a million cities, rode on a million horses, had under it a million vassals and slew a million warriors, yet it could not resist the angel of death.

=== Throne ===
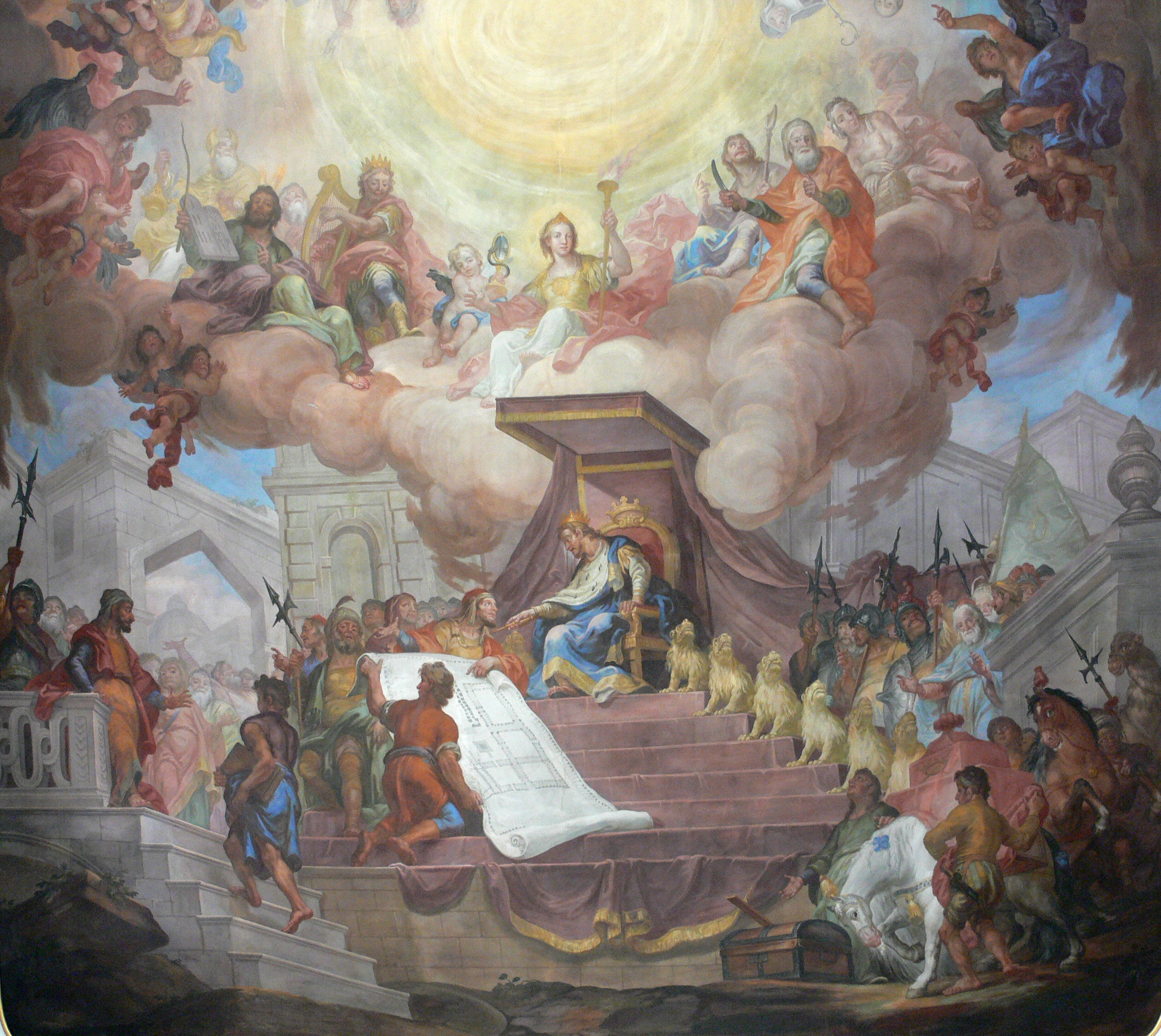
Solomon at his throne, painting by Andreas Brugger, 1777

Solomon's throne is described at length in Targum Sheni, which is compiled from three different sources, and in two later Midrash. According to these, there were on the steps of the throne twelve golden lions, each facing a golden eagle. There were six steps to the throne, on which animals, all of gold, were arranged in the following order: on the first step a lion opposite an ox; on the second, a wolf opposite a sheep; on the third, a tiger opposite a camel; on the fourth, an eagle opposite a peacock, on the fifth, a cat opposite a cock; on the sixth, a sparrow-hawk opposite a dove. On the top of the throne was a dove holding a sparrow-hawk in its claws, symbolizing the dominion of Israel over the Gentiles. The first midrash claims that six steps were constructed because Solomon foresaw that six kings would sit on the throne, namely, Solomon, Rehoboam, Hezekiah, Manasseh, Amon, and Josiah. There was also on the top of the throne a golden candelabrum, on the seven branches of the one side of which were engraved the names of the seven patriarchs Adam, Noah, Shem, Abraham, Isaac, Jacob, and Job, and on the seven of the other the names of Levi, Kohath, Amram, Moses, Aaron, Eldad, Medad, and, in addition, Hur (another version has Haggai). Above the candelabrum was a golden jar filled with olive oil and beneath it a golden basin which supplied the jar with oil and on which the names of Nadab, Abihu, and Eli and his two sons were engraved. Over the throne, twenty-four vines were fixed to cast a shadow on the king's head.

By a mechanical contrivance the throne followed Solomon wherever he wished to go. Supposedly, due to another mechanical trick, when the king reached the first step, the ox stretched forth its leg, on which Solomon leaned, a similar action taking place in the case of the animals on each of the six steps. From the sixth step the eagles raised the king and placed him in his seat, near which a golden serpent lay coiled. When the king was seated the large eagle placed the crown on his head, the serpent uncoiled itself, and the lions and eagles moved upward to form a shade over him. The dove then descended, took the scroll of the Law from the Ark, and placed it on Solomon's knees. When the king sat, surrounded by the Sanhedrin, to judge the people, the wheels began to turn, and the beasts and fowls began to utter their respective cries, which frightened those who had intended to bear false testimony. Moreover, while Solomon was ascending the throne, the lions scattered various fragrant spices. After Solomon's death, Pharaoh Shishak, when taking away the treasures of the Temple (I Kings xiv. 26), carried off the throne, which remained in Egypt until Sennacherib conquered that country. After Sennacherib's fall Hezekiah gained possession of it, but when Josiah was slain by Pharaoh Necho, the latter took it away. However, according to rabbinical accounts, Necho did not know how the mechanism worked and so accidentally struck himself with one of the lions causing him to become lame; Nebuchadnezzar, into whose possession the throne subsequently came, shared a similar fate. The throne then passed to the Persians, whose king Darius was the first to sit successfully on Solomon's throne after his death; subsequently the throne came into the possession of the Greeks and Ahasuerus.

== Freemasonry ==
Masonic rituals refer to King Solomon and the building of his Temple. Masonic Temples, where a Masonic Lodge meets, are an allegorical reference to King Solomon's Temple.

== Places ==
The Solomon Islands, a country and archipelago in Melanesia, were named for King Solomon by the Spanish navigator Álvaro de Mendaña, who became the first European to see the islands in 1568.

== In literature, art, and music ==
=== Literature ===
- In H. Rider Haggard's King Solomon's Mines (1885) the protagonists discover multiple settings said to have belonged to or to have been built at the request of King Solomon, such as 'Solomon's Great Road' and the mines themselves. Also, the two mountains which form the entrance to Kukuana Land (where the mines are located in the novel) are referred to as 'Sheba's Breasts' which could be an allusion to the Queen of Sheba, with whom King Solomon had a relationship, or Solomon's mother, who was named Bathsheba. When in the mines, the characters also contemplate what must have occurred to prevent King Solomon from returning to retrieve the massive amounts of diamonds, gold and ivory tusks that were found buried in his great 'Treasure Chamber'.
- In the Divine Comedy, the spirit of Solomon appears to Dante Alighieri in the Heaven of the Sun with other exemplars of inspired wisdom.
- In Friedrich Dürrenmatt's The Physicists, the physicist Möbius claims that Solomon appears to him and dictates the "theory of all possible inventions" (based on unified field theory).
- Solomon appears in Rudyard Kipling's Just So Stories.
- O. Henry's short story The Gift of the Magi (1905) contains the following description to convey the preciousness of character Jim Dillingham Young's pocket watch: "Had King Solomon been the janitor, with all his treasures piled up in the basement, Jim would have pulled out his watch every time he passed, just to see him pluck at his beard from envy."
- In Neal Stephenson's three-volume The Baroque Cycle, 17th-century alchemists like Isaac Newton believe that Solomon created a kind of "heavier" gold with mystical properties and that it was cached in the Solomon Islands where it was accidentally discovered by the crew of a wayward Spanish galleon. In the third volume of The Baroque Cycle, The System of the World, a mysterious member of the entourage of tsar Peter the Great, named "Solomon Kohan" appears in early 18th-century London. The czar, traveling incognito to purchase English-made ships for his navy, explains that he added him to his court after the Sack of Azov, where Kohan had been a guest of the Pasha. Solomon Kohan is later revealed as one of the extremely long-lived "Wise," such as Enoch Root, and compares a courtyard full of inventors' workstations to "an operation I used to have in Jerusalem a long time ago", denominating either facility as "a temple". Stephenson's sequel to Reamde, 2019's Fall; or, Dodge in Hell was also a surprise sequel to the Baroque Cycle novels and Cryptonomicon. In the mid- to late-21st century span of Fall, Solomon Kohan has joined the faculty of Princeton University, going by Solly Pesador, and is described by a student as "one of those guys who had been around forever and played roles in tech companies going at least as far back as Hewlett-Packard" and as an "old-school tech geek turned neuro-hacker".
- In The Ring of Solomon, both King Solomon and the Queen of Sheba are featured prominently.
- Solomon, King of Urushalim, is a significant character in The Shadow Prince, the first novel of Philip Armstrong's epic historical fantasy, The Chronicles of Tupiluliuma. His Ring is an Atalantaën Relic, by which is he able to command daemons. He uses it to summon a daemon army, thereafter called the Cohort of Free Daemons, to oppose the forces of the Chaos God, Sutekh, thus allowing the young Hittite musician, Lisarwa, to repair the Veil that separates the physical world from the dangerous wild energies of the Netherworld, using another of the relics, the Harp of Daud, once owned by his father (King David). Solomon's son, Rehoboam also appears in a minor capacity.
- In the Japanese manga series Magi: The Labyrinth of Magic, Solomon was a powerful magician who united all of the world under his peaceful rule. However, when this world was destroyed by a calamity, he created the world Magi is set in and saved mankind by sending them there. A special power originated from him, the "Wisdom of Solomon", allows the main character Aladdin to talk directly with the soul of a person, alive or dead.
- In the manga Devils and Realist, Solomon is a friend of Lucifer and is the "Elector"—the one who can choose the interim ruler over Hell as its emperor rests to regain his strength and had powers over demons known as his seventy-two pillars. He's also known as the one who can control Hell or Heaven with the power of his ring.
- Chapter 14 of the Adventures of Huckleberry Finn ends with Huck and Jim debating over how wise Solomon really was.
- In Francis Bacon's Essay 'Of Revenge', Solomon is paraphrased: "And Solomon, I am sure, saith, It is the glory of a man, to pass by an offence."
- In DC Comics, Solomon is one of the Immortal Elders of the hero Captain Marvel.
- In a subject called in art the Idolatry of Solomon, the foreign wives are depicted as leading Solomon away from Yahweh toward idolatry because they worshiped gods other than Yahweh (1 Kings 11:1–3). This forms part of the Power of Women topos in the Middle Ages and Renaissance, showing the dangers women posed to even the most virtuous men.
- Naamah, a princess of Ammon (now in Jordan) who arrives in Jerusalem at age fourteen to marry King Solomon and tells of their life together, is the narrator of Aryeh Lev Stollman's novel Queen of Jerusalem, which was published in 2020 by Aryeh Nir/Modan (Tel Aviv) in Hebrew translation under the title Divrei Y'mai Naamah (דברי ימי נעמה).

=== Film ===
- Solomon and Sheba (1959)—Epic film directed by King Vidor, starring Yul Brynner and Gina Lollobrigida
- Solomon & Sheba (1995)—Showtime film directed by Robert M. Young starring Halle Berry and Jimmy Smits
- Solomon (1997, TNT)—directed by Roger Young, starring Ben Cross
- Brooklyn Babylon (2001)— a modern retelling of the story of Solomon and the Queen of Sheba, set during the Crown Heights riot
- The Kingdom of Solomon (2009)—Iranian production directed by Shahriar Bahrani
- The Song (2014)—a modern retelling directed by Richard Ramsey, starring Alan Powell, Ali Faulkner, and Caitlin Nicol-Thomas
- Three Thousand Years of Longing (2022)—King Solomon woos the Queen of Sheba in the first tale told by the Djinn

=== Music ===
- Popol Vuh, Das Hohelied Salomos – 1975 album with Solomon texts set to music.
- Giacomo Carissimi, The Judgement of Solomon for three chorus, two violins and organ
- Marc-Antoine Charpentier, Judicium Salomnis, H 422, Oratorio for soloists, chorus, orchestra, and continuo 1702
- Sébastien de Brossard, Solomon's fall, cantata
- Handel composed an oratorio entitled Solomon in 1748. The story follows the basic biblical plot.
- Ernest Bloch composed a Hebraic Rhapsody for cello and orchestra entitled Schelomo, based on King Solomon.
- Kate Bush wrote a song called "Song of Solomon" in 1993 for her album The Red Shoes.
- Toivo Tulev composed a piece for choir, soloists and chamber orchestra entitled Songs in 2005. The text is taken directly from the Song of Songs in its English, Spanish and Latin translations.
- Derrick Harriott has a rocksteady song titled Solomon (later covered by Junior Murvin), in which he warns a woman that he is wiser than Solomon in the ways of women.
- Jamaican dancehall rapper Sean Paul mentions King Solomon in his 2005 hit song "We Be Burnin'". Specifically Sean Paul references the legend that marijuana was found on the grave of King Solomon.
- The New Pornographers included a song entitled "One Kind of Solomon" on their 2019 album In the Morse Code of Brake Lights.
- Cassandra Wilson performs the self-penned 'Solomon Sang' on her 1995 Blue Note album, New Moon Daughter.
- Grateful Dead have a song called "King Solomon's Marbles" on their 1975 album, Blues for Allah.
- M. Nasir's "Tanya Sama Itu Hud Hud" revolves around the correspondence of the hoopoe (hudhud) with the figure especially as told through the poem The Conference of the Birds.
- Momus' debut album Circus Maximus featured a song called "King Solomon's Song And Mine".
- The British Coronation Anthem "Zadok The Priest" mentions the anointing of King Solomon by Zadok and Nathan the Prophet. The lyrics are derived from 1 Kings 1:34-45.

== See also ==
- The Lesser Key of Solomon
- Heichal Shlomo
- Kings of Israel and Judah
- Solomon and Marcolf
- Solomon in Islam
- Solomon's Pools
- Solomonic column
- Solomonic dynasty
- The Judgement of Solomon (Giorgione)
- Prison of Solomon
- Throne of Solomon
- Solomon's paradox

== Bibliography ==
- Coogan, Michael D (2009). A Brief Introduction to the Old Testament. Oxford University Press.
- Dever, William G. (2001). What Did the Biblical Writers Know and When Did They Know It?: What Archaeology Can Tell Us about the Reality of Ancient Israel. Grand Rapids, MI: Eerdmans Pub. ISBN 978-0-8028-4794-2. OCLC 45487499.
- ——— (2003). Who Were the Early Israelites and Where Did They Come From?. William B Eermans. ISBN 978-0-8028-0975-9.
- Faust, Avraham; Farber, Zev I. (2025). The Bible's First Kings: Uncovering the Story of Saul, David, and Solomon. Cambridge University Press. ISBN 978-1-009-52633-3.
- Finkelstein, Israel; Silberman, Neil Asher (2001). The Bible Unearthed: Archaeology's New Vision of Ancient Israel and the Origin of Its Sacred Texts. Simon & Schuster. ISBN 978-0-7432-2338-6.
- ———; Silberman, Neil Asher (2006). David and Solomon: In Search of the Bible's Sacred Kings and the Roots of the Western Tradition. Free Press. ISBN 978-0-7432-4362-9.
- Kalimi, Isaac (2018). Writing and Rewriting the Story of Solomon in Ancient Israel. Cambridge University Press. ISBN 978-1-108-47126-8.
- Levy, Thomas E; Higham, Thomas, eds. (2005). The Bible and Radiocarbon Dating: Archaeology, Text and Science. London; Oakville, CT: Equinox. ISBN 978-1-84553-056-3. OCLC 60453952.
- Kitchen, Kenneth A. (2003). On the reliability of the Old Testament. Grand Rapids, MI: Eerdmans. ISBN 978-0-8028-4960-1.
- Thiele, Edwin R. (1983). The Mysterious Numbers of the Hebrew Kings (3rd ed.). Grand Rapids, Michigan: Zondervan. ISBN 978-0-310-36010-0.
- King, Solomon (2021). The Book of Wisdom of Solomon. Lamp of Trismegistus. ISBN 978-1631185021.

Solomon House of David
Regnal titles
| Preceded by David | King of the United Kingdom of Israel and Judah; 971–931 BCE | Succeeded by Rehoboam in Judah |
| Preceded by David | King of the United Kingdom of Israel and Judah; 971–931 BCE | Succeeded by Jeroboam I in Israel |
