= Naamah (wife of Solomon) =

Biblical figure; wife of the Israelite king Solomon

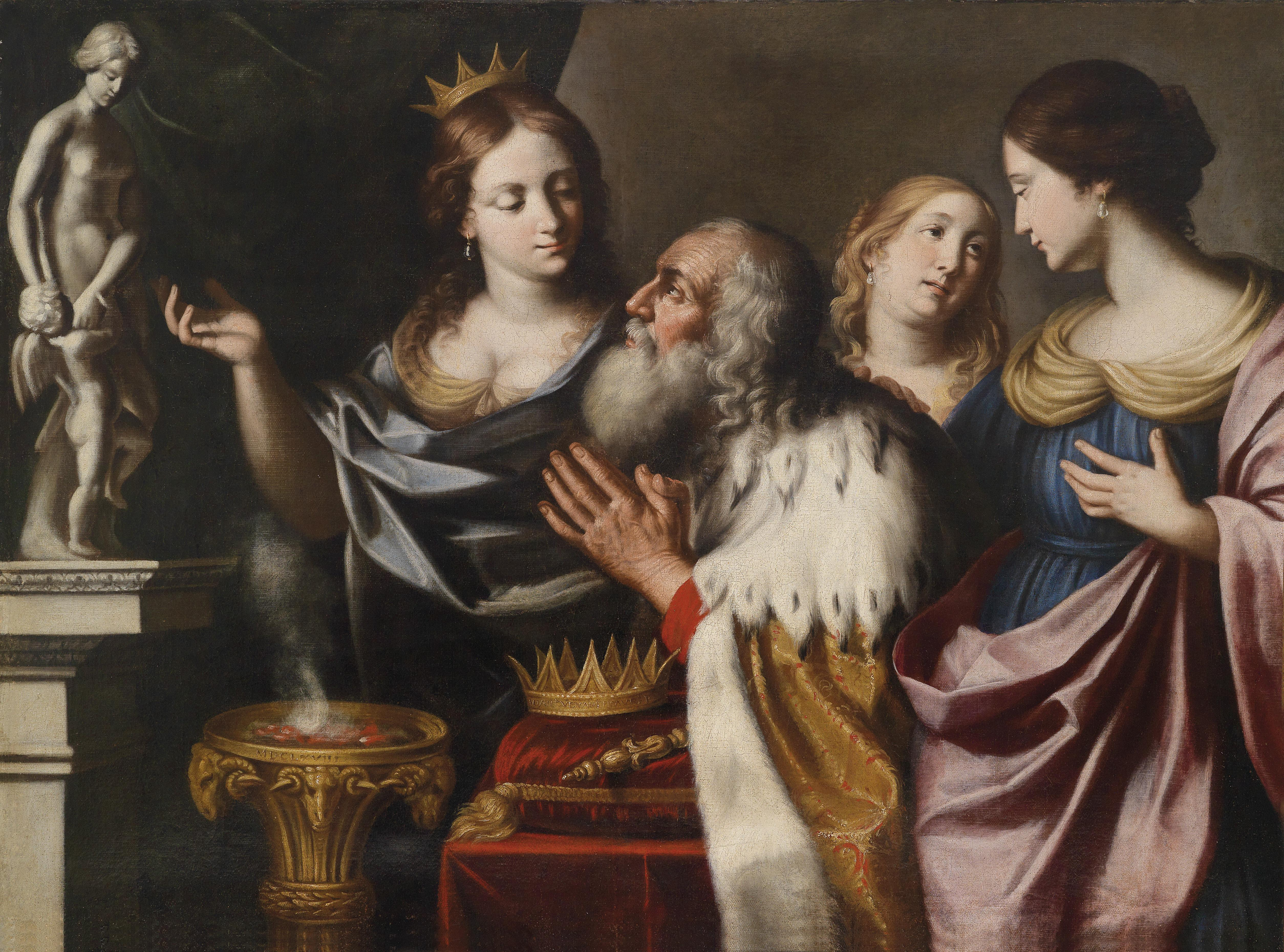
Depiction by Giovanni Battista Venanzi of King Solomon being led astray into idolatry in his old age by his wives, 1668.

Naamah (Hebrew: נַעֲמָה, romanized: Naʿămā, lit. 'pleasant; lovely') was one of the 700 wives and 300 concubines of King Solomon and mother of his heir, Rehoboam, according to both 1 Kings 14:21–31, and 2 Chronicles 12:13 in the Hebrew Bible. She was an Ammonite, and, as such, one of only two of all the Queen Mothers of Israel or Judah who was a foreigner (the other being Jezebel). She was also the only one of Solomon's wives to be mentioned, within the Hebrew Bible, as having borne a child.

Naamah is mentioned in Bava Kamma 38b wherein it states that Moses had previously been warned by God not to make war upon the Ammonites, Molech worshippers, for Naamah was to descend from them, and in Yebamoth 63a, where alongside Ruth she is described as one of two "good shoots grafted" (converted) into Judaism.

She was said to be the daughter of Hanun, king of the Ammonites in Greek biblical texts and rabbinic literature.

== In literature ==
=== Literature ===
Naamah, a princess of Ammon, (part of present-day Jordan) who arrives in Jerusalem at age fourteen to marry King Solomon and of all his wives, being the only one to capture his heart, becomes the mother of his dynasty, is the narrator of Aryeh Lev Stollman's novel published by Aryeh Nir/Modan (Tel Aviv) in Hebrew translation under the title Divrei Y'mai Naamah (דברי ימי נעמה).

=== Rabbinical literature ===
One legend concerning Asmodeus (see: The Story of King Solomon and Ashmedai) goes on to state that Solomon one day asked Asmodeus what could make demons powerful over man, and Asmodeus asked to be freed and given the ring so that he could demonstrate; Solomon agreed but Asmodeus threw the ring into the sea and it was swallowed by a fish. Asmodeus then swallowed the king, stood up fully with one wing touching heaven and the other earth, and spat out Solomon to a distance of 400 miles. The Rabbis claim this was a divine punishment for Solomon's having failed to follow three divine commands, and Solomon was forced to wander from city to city, until he eventually arrived in an Ammonite city where he was forced to work in the king's kitchens. Solomon gained a chance to prepare a meal for the Ammonite king, which the king found so impressive that the previous cook was sacked and Solomon put in his place; the king's daughter, Naamah, subsequently fell in love with Solomon, but the family (thinking Solomon a commoner) disapproved, so the king decided to kill them both by sending them into the desert. Solomon and the king's daughter wandered the desert until they reached a coastal city, where they bought a fish to eat, which just happened to be the one which had swallowed the magic ring. Solomon was then able to regain his throne and expel Asmodeus. The element of a ring thrown into the sea and found back in a fish's belly also appeared in Herodotus' account of Polycrates, the tyrant of Samos (c. 538–522 BCE).
