= Fall; or, Dodge in Hell =

2019 speculative fiction novel by Neal Stephenson

- Cover of the hardcover first edition
- Author: Neal Stephenson
- Audio read by: Malcolm Hillgartner
- Illustrator: Nick Springer / Springer Cartographics LLC
- Cover artist: Fritz Metsch
- Language: English
- Genre: Science fiction
- Publisher: William Morrow an imprint of HarperCollins
- Publication date: June 4, 2019
- Media type: Print (hardcover)
- Pages: 883
- ISBN: 978-0-06-245871-1
- OCLC: 1085577389
- LC Class: PS3569.T3868 F35 2019
- Preceded by: Reamde

Fall; or, Dodge in Hell is a 2019 speculative fiction novel by American author Neal Stephenson. The book explores mind-uploading to the Cloud, from the perspective of Richard "Dodge" Forthrast, a character introduced in Stephenson's 2011 Reamde.

== Plot summary ==
Billionaire Richard "Dodge" Forthrast is declared brain-dead after a routine medical procedure. Friends and family find his last will directs that his body be cryonically preserved for the purpose of future brain scanning and eventual revival. His wishes are fulfilled, his frozen brain destructively scanned, and his connectome saved in digital form.

Several years pass in which portable augmented reality viewers become ubiquitous, social media echo chambers cause rural lawlessness, commercial quantum computing is feasible, and anonymous distributed ledger identification becomes popular in business.

Dodge's grandniece Sophia animates Dodge's connectome as an experiment on secure distributed computing, for her senior thesis at Princeton. The connectome remembers nearly nothing, but names itself "Egdod" after Dodge's character in the video game made by his company. It builds a virtual world, with physical laws similar to what little it does "remember". Wealthy anonymous donors initially fund the support of datacenters running this "world". Brain scanning gains general popularity, after traffic analysis shows that virtual minds are achieving an afterlife in a medieval fantasy setting. All the downloaded minds, however, suffer extreme amnesia.

Egdod is usurped by El, a terminally and mentally ill billionaire, who is funding the computing process. El believes that Dodge not only lacked imagination when constructing the virtual world, but that he also consumes a disproportionate amount of computing power. El conquers the virtual world, isolates Dodge (with the power of his mind, aided by augmentation by his private data centers). El subjugates the (virtual) population with a religion centered upon worship of him. Sophia (after being murdered by El) enters this virtual world, to assist Dodge in disrupting El's power. She, and several other characters, embark on an epic quest. Stephenson, in narrating this, is able to describe many aspects of this medieval fantasy world, and of the beliefs that El has instilled amongst its peoples. In the end Dodge and El have one final confrontation to determine whose vision for this virtual world prevails.

== Philosophical and scientific content and influences ==
When attempting to explain why the virtual world created by connectomes of brain scans resembles the physical world so much, character Corvallis Kawasaki cites a claim by philosopher Immanuel Kant that the human mind cannot make sense of anything without a space-time lattice.

Stephenson indicates Fall is indebted to David Deutsch's 1997 book The Fabric of Reality, as well as John Milton's 17th century poem Paradise Lost.

Fall and Reamde are set in the same fictional universe as Cryptonomicon and The Baroque Cycle. Fall refers to the historical figures of Lawrence Waterhouse and Rudolf von Hacklheber from Cryptonomicon, and Enoch Root makes an appearance in the story.

== Reception ==
Fall was largely well received in the press. Reviewers called it "compelling," "mind-blowing", and "the best thing [Stephenson] has written in ages." Some criticized its length and tendency to digress, while often noting that Stephenson's fans expect this from him. Adam Roberts in The Guardian said the "digital afterlife reminded [him] a little of C.S. Lewis's Narnia books," and Laura Miller in Slate described the novel's depiction of its Ameristan region as "savage, Swiftian satire."

Publishers Weekly was more critical, saying that the book's "post-truth" physical realm and its digital afterlife each "simplistically replicate present-day societal power structures, showing the limits of Stephenson's imagination," and that the book features "unwieldy dialogue" and "uneven pacing." They did allow that "[f]ans of Stephenson's passion for the minutiae of technological innovations will revel in the intricacies of his construction."
