= Reamde =

2011 novel by Neal Stephenson

- Author: Neal Stephenson
- Language: English
- Genre: Science-fiction
- Publisher: William Morrow (US); Atlantic Books (UK)
- Publication date: September 20, 2011
- Publication place: United States
- Media type: Print (hardcover)
- Pages: 1056
- ISBN: 978-0-06-197796-1
- OCLC: 703206576
- Dewey Decimal: 813/.54
- LC Class: PS3569.T3868 R43 2011
- Followed by: Fall; or, Dodge in Hell

Reamde is a science-fiction novel by Neal Stephenson, published in 2011. The story, set in the present day, centers on the plight of a hostage and the ensuing efforts of family and new acquaintances, many of them associated with a fictional MMORPG, to rescue her as her various captors drag her about the globe. Topics covered range from online activities including gold farming and social networking to the criminal methods of the Russian mafia and Islamic terrorists.

== Plot summary ==
Zula Forthrast, an adopted Eritrean, is given a job by her billionaire uncle, Richard "Dodge" Forthrast, at his company, Corporation 9592, which runs an MMORPG called "T'Rain". Zula and her boyfriend, Peter, visit Richard's cat-skiing resort. Desperate for money, Peter sells a database of stolen credit card numbers to a shady contact, who is in fact working for the Russian mob. The transaction inadvertently results in a T'Rain-based ransomware virus infecting the contact's laptop and rendering the only copy of the database useless. Ivanov, a senior gangster behind the deal, tracks Peter down and coerces him and Zula to help him find the virus creators in Xiamen, China.

Upon arriving in China, Peter, Zula, and Sokolov (a former Spetsnaz security consultant hired by Ivanov) locate the virus creators' apartment. The Russian team prepares to raid the apartment, only to be misdirected by Zula into a random apartment, which coincidentally happens to house Islamic terrorists preparing to bomb an international trade conference. After a subsequent gun battle, Ivanov kills Peter, and Abdallah Jones, the head of the Islamist cell, kills Ivanov. The hackers flee the building just before a fire causes the stored explosives to detonate, collapsing the building. Jones flees with Zula as his hostage. Olivia Halifax-Lin, an MI6 agent posted to Xiamen to manage surveillance on Jones, meets Sokolov during his escape from the building, and the two become romantically involved while fleeing to Taiwan. Sokolov believes that Zula is the only blameless person in this ordeal and he is honor-bound to rescue her from Jones.

Jones and Zula covertly fly from China into the Canadian wilderness and move south toward the US border. Jones plans to use Zula to force Richard to help him cross the border using a secret smuggling route known to Richard. Meanwhile, Sokolov is temporarily separated from Olivia and narrowly escapes Taiwan by sea, eventually entering the US in pursuit of Jones. Olivia is reassigned by MI6 to locate Jones in cooperation with the CIA and the FBI, but suspects that all three agencies' traditional approaches are inadequate for the task.

These various threads as the characters kidnap, aid, kill, or flee each other are interwoven with a narrative from Dodge Forthrast's point of view, as he gradually becomes aware of Zula's disappearance and begins taking action, along with his brothers. In the meantime, he recalls the founding of T'rain and the roles of the various technical and creative people (Pluto, C+, D-squared, and Skeletor) involved, as well as his Chinese co-founder, Nolan. T'rain is under pressure because it is the moneychanger for the Reamde ransomware, but also because its participants have dropped their affiliation with Good vs. Evil and are now aligning on two sides that try to destroy each other, the Earthtone Coalition and the Forces of Brightness. Dodge activates his avatar Egdod to follow clues in T'rain as to Zula's whereabouts. As he moves out into the physical world, he contemplates his own mortality.

Eventually, all of the main characters converge on Richard's ski resort and its US-side counterpart, where Richard's younger brother, Jake, lives with a community of Christian isolationists and heavily armed Second Amendment devotees. The terrorists camp near the resort and inform Richard of their hostage, forcing him to lead them into the US while a small team detonates a suicide bomb near a border crossing as a distraction. After being used as bait, Zula manages to escape and sets out to rescue her uncle. Meanwhile, Jones's US-based terrorist cells converge on the community from the south, and protagonists and terrorists engage in a massive gunfight, terminating with the defeat of the terrorists and Jones's death at the hands of Richard.

Three romantic relationships form during the novel, and appear to continue after its end: Yuxia and Seamus, Zula and Csongor, Olivia and Sokolov.

== Sequel ==
Fall; or, Dodge in Hell (2019) was promoted simply as a sequel to Reamde, featuring Richard Forthrast, Zula Forthrast, Corvallis "C-plus" Kawasaki, and T'Rain geologist P.T. “Pluto” Olszewski, but there are also surprise appearances or mentions of characters and organizations from Cryptonomicon and The System of the World.

== Characters ==
- Richard "Dodge" Forthrast, a former marijuana smuggler who launched and still oversees a successful gaming company and runs a cat skiing lodge near the border crossing of his old smuggling route.
- Zula Forthrast, a 25-year-old Eritrean adoptee educated in geology and programming who works for her Uncle Richard's gaming company.
- Peter Curtis, a computer security consultant and boyfriend of Zula.
- Wallace, a Canadian-based Scottish money manager and criminal working for Ivanov.
- Ivanov, a high-level Russian mobster.
- Csongor Takács, a 25-year-old freelance Hungarian computer security consultant sysadmin who works for Ivanov.
- Abdallah Jones, a Welsh-born Muslim-convert terrorist affiliated with Al-Qaeda jihadists in Pakistan and other Sunni cells.
- Marlon, a Chinese hacker and leader of the group who created the Reamde virus.
- Qian Yuxia, a Hakka guide and part-time tea saleswoman.
- Olivia Halifax-Lin, a British citizen of Chinese descent and an MI6 operative.
- Sokolov, a former Russian military and Spetsnaz man who now acts as a security consultant operating out of Toronto, hired by Ivanov to find the Chinese virus writers.
- Seamus Costello, a CIA operative based in the Philippines who is obsessed with neutralizing Abdallah Jones. Also an avid T'Rain player.
- John Forthrast, the eldest Forthrast brother who lost both legs in Vietnam and took parental responsibility for Zula after his sister Patricia died.
- Jacob "Jake" Forthrast, the youngest Forthrast brother, a Christian isolationist who lives with his immediate family and like-minded neighbors in Idaho near Prohibition Crick, a former safe house on Richard's old drug smuggling route.
- Donald "D-squared" Cameron, a Cambridge fellow and author of highly regarded fantasy fiction contracted to provide a broad, consistent narrative of T'Rain.
- Devin "Skeletor" Skraelin, an absurdly prolific pulp fantasy author under long-term contract to fill in narrative details of T'Rain.
- Ershut, a follower of Abdallah Jones.

== Reception ==
Writing in the Irish Examiner, Val Nolan called Reamde "one of the smartest, fastest-moving, and most consistently enjoyable novels of the year". It is, Nolan went on, a "painstakingly-researched, deftly-plotted roller-coaster of gigabytes and gunplay, a pitch-perfect pastiche of Robert Ludlum or Tom Clancy-style techno-thrillers and a comment on contemporary digitality and the ubiquity of online interconnectivity."

Rowan Kaiser for The A.V. Club gives Reamde an A− rating saying: "The marriage of the thrilling and the nerdy is what makes Reamde work, and it offers a glimpse at a fascinating writer making a welcome transition back into a more accessible style."

Kirkus Reviews sums up Reamde as: "An intriguing yarn—most geeky, and full of satisfying mayhem."

Cory Doctorow writes in his Boing Boing review: "Stephenson's several exquisitely choreographed shoot-outs (including an epic, 100+ page climactic mini-war) are filled with technical gubbins about guns that convey the real and genuine enthusiasm of a hardcore gun-nut, with so much verve, so much moment, that I found myself itching to find a firing range and try some of this stuff out for myself."

Michelle West, reviewing the novel for The Magazine of Fantasy & Science Fiction, did not consider the book to be science fiction and called it "a geek thriller." She wrote, "Even if I don't like characters Stephenson's created, I nonetheless find them engaging, and I read him in large part for his characters and the particular ways in which they process information and interact with the world. Of his novels, this has easily the most structurally solid ending. In feel, it's closest to Cryptonomicon, although all of the action takes place in the present, where information travels quickly, and cellphones and wifi are ubiquitous. I enjoyed it greatly, and I frequently laughed out loud at his descriptions or his dialogue; it read like a much shorter book."

In an interview, Paul Di Filippo called Reamde "the most gripping and funny and wise thriller I've ever read."

Entertainment Weekly called it "an ingenious epic" in their "Must List" column.
