= Bobby Shaftoe =

Bobby Shaftoe may refer to:

- Bobby Shafto, 18th-century English politician and subject of a famous song
- Bobby Shafto's Gone to Sea, the song itself
- Bobby Shaftoe, a lead character in Neal Stephenson's novel Cryptonomicon
- Sergeant Bob Shaftoe, a related 17th-century character in Stephenson's The Baroque Cycle

== See also ==
- Robert Shafto (disambiguation)
