= Casimirianum =

Casimirianum is the name of a school, respectively the former institutions:

- Casimirianum Coburg in Coburg (Bavaria)
- Casimirianum Neustadt in Neustadt an der Weinstraße (Rheinland-Palatinate)
