= The Confusion =

2004 novel by Neal Stephenson

- First edition
- Author: Neal Stephenson
- Language: English
- Series: The Baroque Cycle
- Genre: Historical novel
- Publisher: William Morrow
- Publication date: 2004
- Publication place: United States
- Media type: Print (Hardback)
- Pages: 815 pp
- ISBN: 0-06-052386-7
- OCLC: 52727987
- Dewey Decimal: 813/.54 22
- LC Class: PS3569.T3868 C55 2004
- Preceded by: Quicksilver
- Followed by: The System of the World

The Confusion is a novel by Neal Stephenson. It is the second volume in The Baroque Cycle and consists of two sections or books, Bonanza and The Juncto. In 2005, The Confusion won the Locus Award, together with The System of the World, also by Stephenson.

== Background ==
Like the other volumes in the series, Confusion was written as multiple novels. However, unlike in the other two volumes of the Series, the two novels are set in concurrent periods. In the publication of the two novels as a single volume, Stephenson chose to publish the volume as alternating sections between Bonanza and The Juncto, book 4 and 5 respectively.

== Plot ==
Though the first publication of the Series in three volumes combined the two novels Bonanza and The Juncto, here the plots will be dealt with as separate entities, true to the author's original intention.

=== Bonanza ===
The beginning of Bonanza finds Jack Shaftoe awakened from a syphilitic blackout of nearly three years. During this time he was a pirate galley slave. The other members of his bench, a motley crew who call themselves "The Cabal" and who include men from Africa, the Far East and Europe, create a plot to capture silver illegally shipped from Central America by a Spanish Viceroy; they convince the Pasha of Algiers and their owner to sponsor this endeavor and negotiate for their freedom and a cut in the profit. They capture the ship, but upon boarding it, they find it full, not of silver as they had expected, but of gold. Fleeing the Spanish they are followed by a frigate in the employ of the duc d'Arcachon, an investor in their plan and a man who wishes to kill Jack for ruining a party in The King of the Vagabonds. Believing the Duke plans to cheat the Cabal in the investment, they sail to Egypt and transport the gold over land to Cairo.

In Cairo the Cabal negotiates with d'Arcachon's men for a meeting with the duc himself; as an inducement for this meeting they offer to hand over Jack. Jack cuts off the head of the duc to avenge Eliza, whom the duc had enslaved over a decade earlier. Fighting ensues between the Cabal and d'Arcachon's musketeers. The Cabal manages to escape (short several of its members and a good portion of the gold), fleeing toward Mokha. Realizing that they are no longer welcome in any European port, they carry the gold to India, where they are captured by a pirate queen who takes the gold. The Cabal is left penniless and its members are dispersed. Some are recruited in the army of a local king. Jack ends up working in an animal hospital in Ahmedabad.

A year later, Jack reunites with a few members of the Cabal and conceives a plan to carry goods through a route that no traders can use because it is controlled by armies of plunderers. Jack shows the Cabal how to produce phosphorus from urine, and they use it to fight their way through. For this role in opening up the trade route, Jack is rewarded with a temporary, three-year kingship over an impoverished part of India. During his reign, Jack directs the construction of a ship made of durable teak wood, using funds invested by the pirate queen who had seized the Cabal's gold, and Sophie, Electress of Hanover. Jack contemplates naming the ship directly after Eliza, with whom he is desperate to be reunited, but on the alchemist Enoch's advice that this could create political complications for the Duchess, Jack ultimately christens the vessel Minerva instead.

The Cabal carries watered steel and other valuable items from India to Japan, and trades them for mercury. Mercury fetches a high price in the Americas, which need it for use in silver mines. A Spanish galleon secretly agrees to show Minerva the way across the Pacific and help them establish trade in the Americas. The galleon sinks, and Minerva takes on its two survivors, one of whom is Edmund de Ath. Jack, another member of the Cabal, and de Ath are imprisoned and tortured by the Spanish Inquisition but are able to buy their way out with silver that they got in trade for mercury.

Jack receives a letter from Eliza urging him to meet her in Qwghlm. Laden with precious metals, Minerva sails there only to find that the invitation was a trap; the French capture them and seize their gold and silver. The letter had been faked by Edmund de Ath, actually Édouard de Gex in disguise, who had been working with Vrej, one of the Cabal members, who believed his family had been wronged by Jack. Minerva and her crew are allowed to leave sans cargo, but Jack is imprisoned by the duc d'Arcachon, son of the man whose head Jack cut off in Cairo, and husband of Eliza. Upon discovering the deceit, Vrej kills the duc d'Arcachon, before committing suicide to prevent retaliation upon his family. The duc had planned to imprison Jack for the rest of his life, but the King of France Louis XIV frees him in order to enlist his help in sacking the Tower of London (and thereby England's mint) in order to cripple the enemy country's economy.

=== The Juncto ===
The book opens explaining how Bob Shaftoe had come into possession of the correspondence of d'Avaux, the French diplomat whom Eliza had fooled as a double agent for William of Orange in Quicksilver. Eliza has been captured by Jean Bart in an attempt to escape to England, and is confined to a house in Dunkerque. There both her lover Rossignol, the King's cryptographer, and d'Avaux rush to her. Under blackmail by d'Avaux, Eliza concedes in indefinitely loaning the vast fortune she has earned through trade in Amsterdam to fund the King's war efforts.

Her loss of fortune forces Eliza to return to court life, where she learns that the duc d'Arcachon was the man who had enslaved her and her mother from the isle of Qwghlm. Eliza soon begins plotting to kill him. However, before she can do so, she learns of d'Arcachon's death at the hands of Jack. Jack had pronounced over the body of d'Arcachon that he killed him for a lover. Upon the return of his head to France, d'Avaux realizes who the lover of Jack is. Before Eliza's relationship with Jack can be revealed, Eliza marries Étienne, the son of the duc and becomes Duchess d'Arcachon.

After the marriage, however, Eliza's illegitimate child with Rossignol is kidnapped under the orders of Lothar von Hacklheber in order to maintain leverage over her. To exact her revenge, Eliza engages in a series of financial maneuvers involving the French preparations to invade England. The invasion is ultimately called off in the aftermath of the Battles of Barfleur and La Hogue, but Eliza's manipulations succeed at making her wealthier than ever, while bringing the house of Hacklheber to its knees.

The story refocuses on Bob Shaftoe, as he and the Black Torrent Guard participate in William III's campaign against James II of England in Ireland.

The second half of the book follows the lives of Eliza, Leibniz, Newton, Waterhouse, and Sophia Charlotte over the next 10 years. Waterhouse confronts Newton over his increasingly unstable behavior and his fruitless attempts to derive a "theory of everything" under the enabling influence of Newton's close friend Fatio. Several characters from the Royal Society form "the Juncto", a society that aims to reignite the British commerce through a monetary reform. The Juncto creates the Bank of England and offers Newton a job as the director of the Mint. Eliza is infected with smallpox, but survives. She meets her old friend Princess Eleanor, who was exiled to a dower-house by her second husband, John George IV; she pays him back by infecting him with smallpox as well, and he turns out not to be as lucky. Princess Eleanor dies, and her daughter, Caroline, is adopted by Sophia Charlotte. Caroline turns out to be a bright girl with an interest in natural sciences and she soon forms a friendship with Leibniz.

The story ends in 1702 with Eliza a wealthy duchess of Arcachon and Qwghlm and a widow, Newton at the head of the London Mint, Waterhouse having made the decision to move to Massachusetts and to work on his Logic Mill away from European distractions, Sophia Charlotte the queen of the newly formed Kingdom of Prussia, and Leibniz the president of Prussian Academy of Sciences.

== Style ==
Andrew Leonard points out that Confusion features more bent reality like Stephenson's science fiction than Quicksilver. Also, Leonard notes that the book is more focused on "Kidnapping, murder, torture, war, poison, treachery, romance and despair" than Quicksilver had been.

Comments about Stephenson's humor pervade its reviews. The New Zealand Herald, called it "rich, clever, [and] as dryly funny as ever."

== Themes ==
As in Quicksilver, Stephenson is concerned with the development of modern economics, science, politics, currency, information technology, trade, religion and cryptography. Even though Stephenson deals with these ideas at extreme length, "His attention to detail and relish for providing historical context provide the attentive reader with a liberal education, while his imagination and humor delight."

Overwhelmingly The Confusion has an emphasis on the economy that had not been present as fully in Quicksilver. Andrew Leonard contrasted The Confusion with Quicksilver saying "If one could argue that Quicksilver was about the birth of the scientific method and the application of Reason to unlocking the mysteries of existence, then one could also say The Confusion is about money." The book focuses a lot on bankers, the mining of gold and silver in the new world, and the idea of breaking free from precious metals into the use of Money.

He particularly explores the amount of excess involved in period governments and the financial system as well as the upper classes. Leonard said that "Stephenson seems to be telling us throughout the Baroque Cycle is that the actual way things really happened—the way systems of credit were created, or timber delivered—is just as kooky as anything that a fabulist could concoct out of the wild speculation of his or her own mind." The style too, mimics this excess emphasizing exaggerated ideas and actions. One reviewer, examining this complexity and excess, called it "a baroque church organ, in the middle of playing a complicated fugue at full throttle. At its end, either the reader has fled or is mesmerised, waiting to know what will happen next."

== Characters ==
=== Main characters ===
- Eliza
- Bob Shaftoe
- Jack Shaftoe
- Daniel Waterhouse

=== Other characters ===
- Dappa, galley slave, Nigerian, sailor aboard Minerva
- Enoch Root
- Moseh de la Cruz, galley slave, Spanish Jew
- Vrej Esphahnian, galley slave, Armenian
- Mr. Foot, English galley slave, ex-privateer, ex-publican, ex-slave merchant
- Édouard de Gex, Jesuit fanatic
- Gabriel Goto, galley slave, Jesuit priest from Japan
- Jeronimo, galley slave, a high-born Spaniard with Tourette syndrome
- Lothar von Hacklheber, German banker obsessed with alchemy
- Nyazi, galley slave, camel-trader of the Upper Nile
- Otto van Hoek, galley slave, pirate-hating Dutch captain of the Minerva
- Yevgeny the Raskolnik, galley slave, Russian whaler
- Bonaventure Rossignol, French cryptologist
- Danny Shaftoe, son of Jack Shaftoe
- Jimmy Shaftoe, son of Jack Shaftoe
- Nasr al-Ghurab, rais (commander) of the galleot
- Queen Kottakkal, sovereign of the Malabar pirates.

== Critical reception ==
Reviewers of Confusion were impressed by its quality, some noting the greater complexity and others its more action oriented approach. Andrew Leonard of Salon.com noted that Confusion moved much faster than Quicksilver did, not getting bogged down in an overwhelming amount of detail. He notes that Stephenson is willing to go into excess on certain ideas, developing some plot twists in exhaustive detail. David Larsen of the New Zealand Herald noted "The title is a praiseworthy piece of truth in advertising." His overall commentary on the piece notes how overly complicated the plot was, drawing heavily on the complexity developed in Quicksilver. Yet still discussing his interest and appreciation of the story he wrote "but don't be deterred. Bring on volume three."

== Publication history ==
- ISBN 0-06-052386-7: First hardcover edition, released April, 2004.
- ISBN 0-06-073335-7: Paperback edition.
