= The System of the World =

The System of the World may refer to:

- The System of the World (novel), by Neal Stephenson, 2005
- De mundi systemate, the third book of Isaac Newton's Philosophiæ Naturalis Principia Mathematica
