= Quicksilver (Stephenson novel) =

2003 historical novel by Neal Stephenson

- First edition cover
- Author: Neal Stephenson
- Cover artist: Shubhani Sarkar
- Language: English
- Series: The Baroque Cycle
- Genre: Historical novel
- Publisher: William Morrow
- Publication date: September 23, 2003
- Publication place: United States
- Media type: Print (hardback & paperback)
- Pages: 944 (1st ed., hardback)
- ISBN: 0-380-97742-7 (1st ed., hardback)
- OCLC: 50670032
- Dewey Decimal: 813/.54 21
- LC Class: PS3569.T3868 Q53 2003
- Followed by: The Confusion

Quicksilver is a historical novel by Neal Stephenson, published in 2003. It is the first volume of The Baroque Cycle, his late Baroque historical fiction series, succeeded by The Confusion and The System of the World (both published in 2004). Quicksilver won the Arthur C. Clarke Award and was nominated for the Locus Award in 2004. Stephenson organized the structure of Quicksilver such that chapters have been incorporated into three internal books titled "Quicksilver", "The King of the Vagabonds", and "Odalisque". In 2006, each internal book was released in separate paperback editions, to make the 900 pages more approachable for readers. These internal books were originally independent novels within the greater cycle during composition.

The novel Quicksilver is written in various narrative styles, such as theatrical staging and epistolary, and follows a large group of characters. Though mostly set in England, France, and the United Provinces in the period 1655 through 1673, the first book includes a frame story set in late 1713 Massachusetts. In order to write the novel, Stephenson researched the period extensively and integrates events and historical themes important to historical scholarship throughout the novel. However, Stephenson alters details such as the members of the Cabal ministry, the historical cabinet of Charles II of England, to facilitate the incorporation of his fictional characters. Within the historical context, Stephenson also deals with many themes which pervade his other works, including the exploration of knowledge, communication and cryptography.

The plot of the first and third books focus on Daniel Waterhouse's exploits as a natural philosopher and friend to the young Isaac Newton and his later observations of English politics and religion, respectively. The second book introduces the vagabond Jack Shaftoe ("King of the Vagabonds") and Eliza (a former member of a Turkish harem) as they cross Europe, eventually landing in the Netherlands, where Eliza becomes entangled in commerce and politics. Quicksilver operates in the same fictional universe as Stephenson's earlier novel Cryptonomicon, in which descendants of Quicksilver characters Shaftoe and Waterhouse appear prominently.

== Background and development ==
During the period in which he wrote Cryptonomicon, Stephenson read George Dyson's Darwin Amongst the Machines, which led him to Gottfried Leibniz's interest in a computing machine, the Leibniz–Newton feud, and Newton's work at the Royal Treasury. He considered this "striking when [he] was already working on a book about money and a book about computers," and became inspired to write about the period. Originally intended to be included in Cryptonomicon, Stephenson instead used the material as the foundation for Quicksilver, the first volume of the Baroque Cycle. The research for the sprawling historical novel created what Stephenson called "data management problems", and he resorted to a system of notebooks to record research, track characters, and find material during the writing process.

=== Historicity ===
In Quicksilver, Stephenson places the ancestors of the Cryptonomicon's characters in Enlightenment Europe alongside a cast of historical individuals from Restoration England and the Enlightenment. Amongst the cast are some of the most prominent natural philosophers, mathematicians and scientists (Newton and Leibniz), and politicians (William of Orange and Nassau) of the age. In an interview, Stephenson explained he deliberately depicted both the historical and fictional characters as authentic representatives of historical classes of people, such as the Vagabonds as personified by Jack, and the Barbary slaves as personified by Eliza. In his research for the characters, he explored the major scholarship about the period.

Stephenson did extensive research on the Age of Enlightenment, noting that it is accessible for English speaking researchers because of the many well documented figures such as Leibniz, Newton and Samuel Pepys. In the course of his research he noted historiographic inconsistencies regarding characters of the period which he had to reconcile. Especially prominent was the deification of Newton, Locke and Boyle and their scientific method by Enlightenment and Victorian scholars. He considers the scientific work done during the Baroque period as crucial to the Enlightenment. From his research he concluded that the Enlightenment in general "is and should be a controversial event because although it led to the flourishing of the sciences and political liberties and a lot of good stuff like that, one can also argue that it played a role in the French Revolution and some of the negative events of the time as well." The portrayal of a confusing and uncertain era develops throughout the book.

Some reviewers commented that Stephenson seems to carry his understanding of the period a little too far at times, delving into too much detail. Nick Hasted of The Independent wrote that this research made "descriptions of Restoration London feel leaden, and intellectual discourses between Newton and his contemporaries textbook-dry." Despite the thorough examination of the period, however, Stephenson does take liberty in depicting the Enlightenment. Both main and secondary fictional characters become prominent members of society who advise the most important figures of the period and affect everything from politics to economics and science. For example, he repopulates the real Cabal Ministry with fictional characters.

== Style ==
Quicksilver is a historical fiction novel that occasionally uses fantasy and science fiction techniques. The book is written in "an omniscient modern presence occasionally given to wisecracks, with extensive use of the continuous present". Mark Sanderson of The Daily Telegraph and Steven Poole of The Guardian both describe the novel as in the picaresque genre, a genre common to 17th- and 18th-century Europe. Humor permeates the text, both situational and in the language itself, which emulates the picaresque style.

The narrative often presents protracted digressions. These digressions follow a multitude of events and subjects related to history, philosophy and scientific subjects. For example, USA Today commented on the length of discussion of Newton's interest in the nature of gravity. With these digressions, the narrative also rapidly changes between multiple perspectives, first and third person, as well as using multiple writing techniques, both those familiar to the modern reader and those popular during the Early Modern period. These techniques include letters, drama, cryptographic messaging, genealogies and "more interesting footnotes than found in many academic papers."

Stephenson incorporates 17th-century sentence structure and orthography throughout Quicksilver, most apparent in his use of italicization and capitalization. He adapts a combination of period and anachronistic language throughout the books, mostly to good effect, while allowing diction from modern usage, such as "canal rage", an allusion to road rage. Stephenson chose not to adapt period language for the entire text; instead he allowed such language to enter his writing when it was appropriate, often turning to modern English and modern labels for ideas familiar to modern readers. Stephenson said "I never tried to entertain the illusion that I was going to write something that had no trace of the 20th or the 21st century in it."

== Plot ==
=== Quicksilver ===
The first book is a series of flashbacks from 1713 to the earlier life of Daniel Waterhouse. It begins as Enoch Root arrives in Boston in October 1713 to deliver a letter to Daniel containing a summons from Princess Caroline. She wants Daniel to return to England and attempt to repair the feud between Isaac Newton and Gottfried Leibniz. While following Daniel's decision to return to England and board a Dutch ship (the Minerva) to cross the Atlantic, the book flashes back to when Enoch and Daniel each first met Newton. During the flashbacks, the book refocuses on Daniel's life between 1661 and 1673.

While attending school at Trinity College, Cambridge, Daniel becomes Newton's companion, ensuring that Newton does not harm his health and assisting in his experiments (including rebuffing a clumsy sexual advance from Newton, exactly as Daniel's descendent Lawrence will rebuff Alan Turing in Cryptonomicon). However, the plague of 1665 forces them apart: Newton returns to his family manor and Daniel to the outskirts of London. Daniel quickly tires of the radical Puritan rhetoric of his father, Drake Waterhouse, and decides to join Reverend John Wilkins and Robert Hooke at John Comstock's Epsom estate.

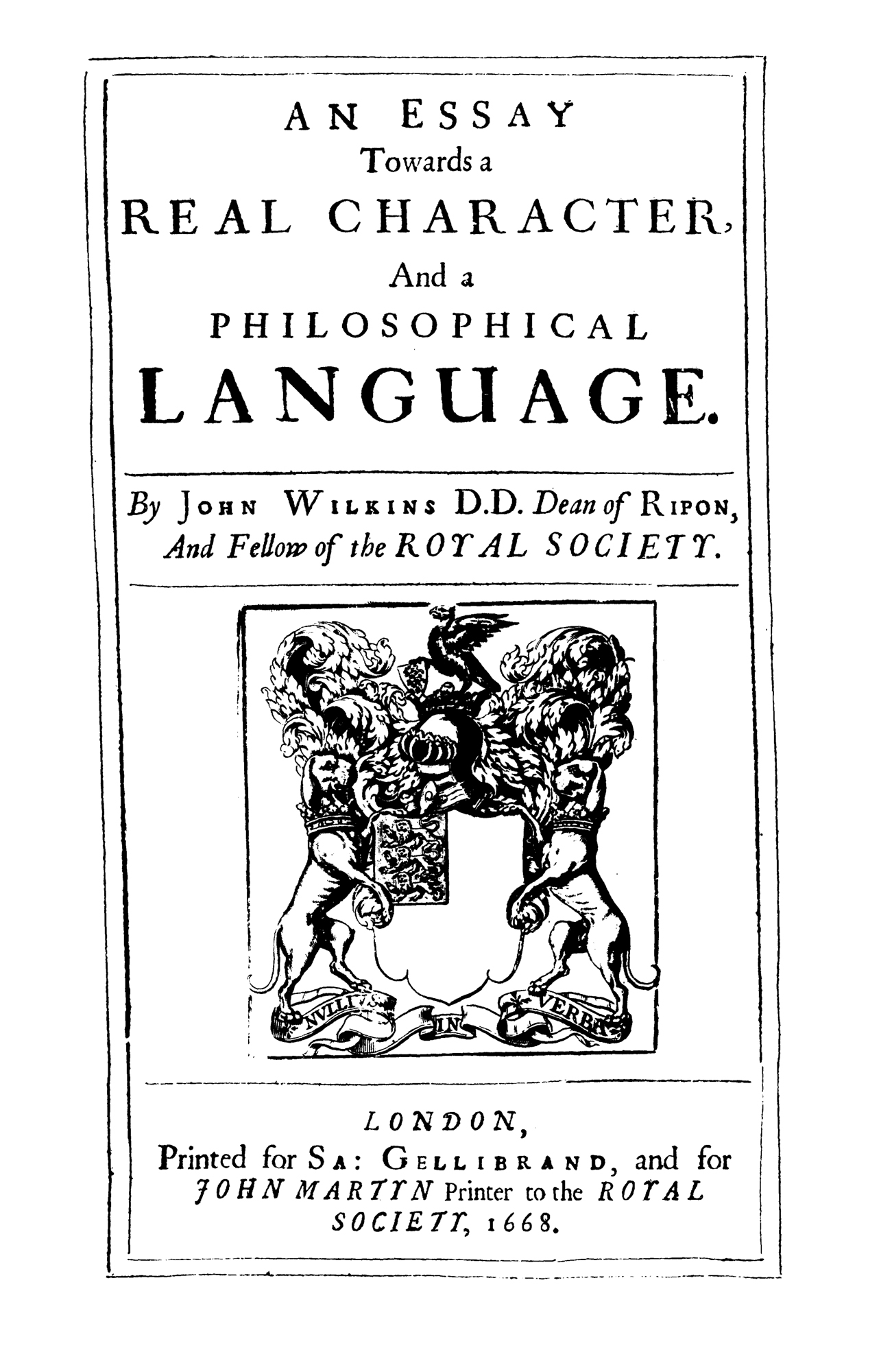
Cover of John Wilkins' An Essay Towards a Real Character, and a Philosophical Language

There Daniel takes part in a number of experiments, including the exploration of the diminishing effects of gravity with changes in elevation, the transfusion of blood between dogs and Wilkins' attempts to create a philosophical language. Daniel soon becomes disgusted with some of the practices of the older natural philosophers (which include vivisection of animals) and visits Newton during his experiments with color and white light. They attempt to return to Cambridge, but again plague expels the students. Daniel returns to his father; however, his arrival on the outskirts of London coincides with the second day of the Fire of London. Drake, taken by religious fervour, dies atop his house as Charles II of England blows it up to create a fire break to prevent further spread of the fire. Soon after Drake's death, Newton and Daniel return to Cambridge and begin lecturing.

A flashforward finds Daniel's ship under attack by the fleet of Edward Teach (Blackbeard) in 1713. Then the story returns to the past as Daniel and Newton return to London: Newton is under the patronage of Louis Anglesey, the Earl of Upnor, and Daniel becomes secretary of the Royal Society when Henry Oldenburg is detained by Charles II for his active foreign correspondence. During his stint in London, Daniel encounters a number of important people from the period. Daniel remains one of the more prominent people in the Royal Society, close to Royal Society members involved in court life and politics. By 1672 both Daniel and Newton become fellows at Trinity College where they build an extensive alchemical laboratory which attracts other significant alchemists including John Locke and Robert Boyle. Daniel convinces Newton to present his work on calculus to the Royal Society.

In 1673, Daniel meets Leibniz in England and acts as his escort, leading him to meetings with important members of British society. Soon, Daniel gains the patronage of Roger Comstock as his architect. While under Roger's patronage, the actress Tess becomes Daniel's mistress both at court and in bed. Finally the book returns to 1713, where Daniel's ship fends off several of Teach's pirate ships. Soon they find out that Teach is after Daniel alone; however, with the application of trigonometry, the ship is able to escape the bay and the pirate band.

=== The King of the Vagabonds ===
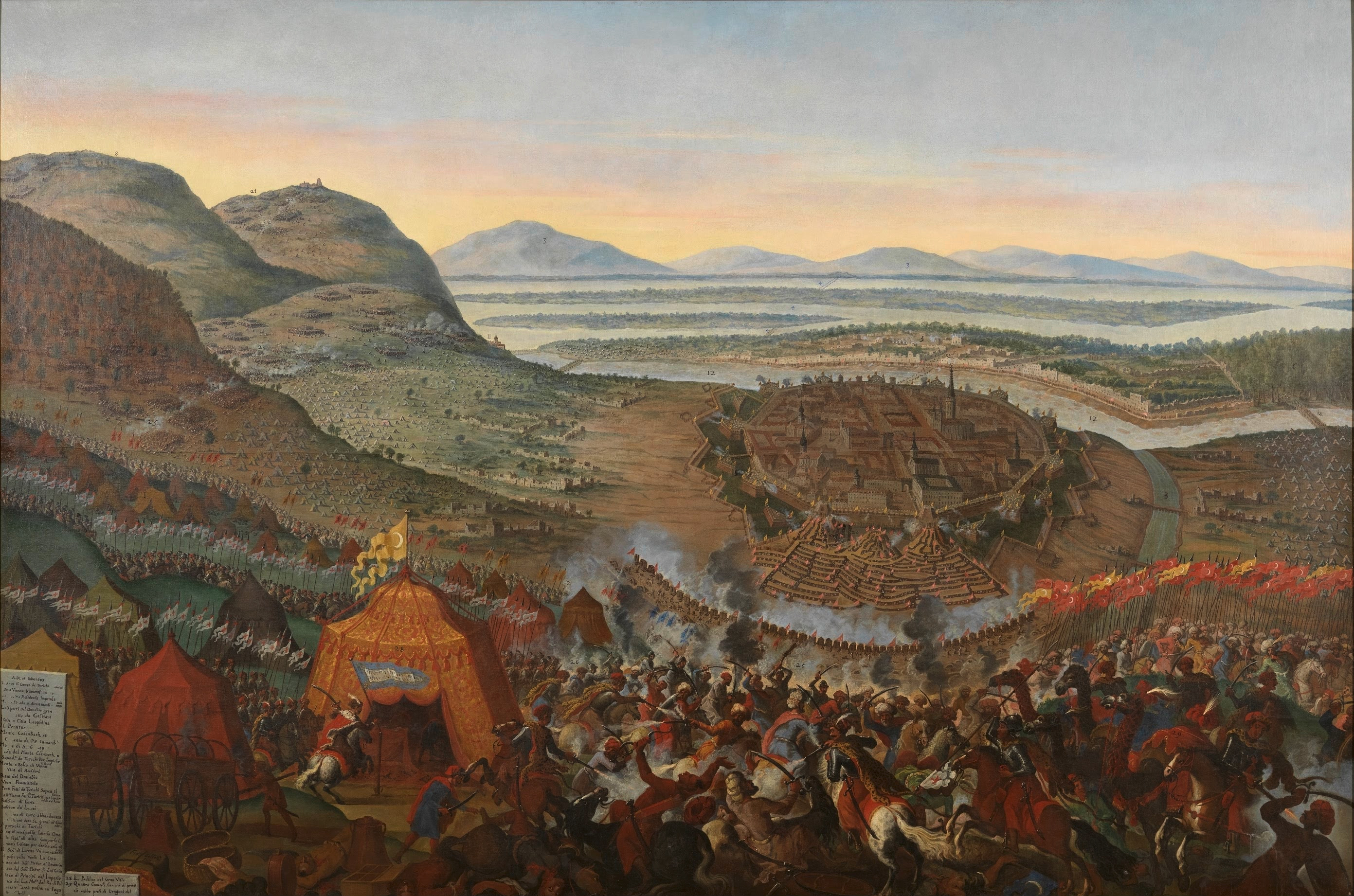
Painting by Frans Geffels representing the Relief of Vienna of 1683, in which the character Jack participates.

The King of Vagabonds focuses on the travels of "Half-Cocked" Jack Shaftoe. It begins by recounting Jack's childhood in the slums outside London where he pursued many disreputable jobs, including hanging from the legs of hanged men to speed their demise. The book then jumps to 1683, when Jack travels to the Battle of Vienna to participate in the European expulsion of the Turks. While attacking the camp, Jack encounters Eliza, a European slave in Mehmed IV's harem, about to be killed by janissaries. He kills the janissaries and loots the area, taking ostrich feathers and acquiring a Turkish warhorse which he calls Turk. The two depart from the camp of the victorious European army and travel through Bohemia into the Palatinate. To sell the ostrich feathers at a high price, they decide to wait until the spring fair in Leipzig. Jack and Eliza spend the winter near a cave warmed by a hot water spring. In the springtime, they travel to the fair dressed as a noblewoman and her bodyguard where they meet Doctor Leibniz. They quickly sell their goods with the help of Leibniz, and agree to accompany him to his silver mine in the Harz Mountains.

Once they arrive at the mine, Jack wanders into the local town where he has a brief encounter with Enoch Root in an apothecary's shop. Jack leaves town but gets lost in the woods, encountering pagan worshippers and witch hunters. He successfully escapes them by finding safe passage through a mine connecting to Leibniz's. Eliza and Jack move on to Amsterdam, where Eliza quickly becomes embroiled in the trade of commodities. Jack goes to Paris to sell the ostrich feathers and Turk, leaving Eliza behind.

When Jack arrives in Paris, he meets and befriends St. George, a professional rat-killer and tamer, who helps him find lodging. While there, he becomes a messenger for bankers between Paris and Marseille. During an attempt to sell Turk, Jack is captured by nobles. Luckily, the presence of Jack's former employer, John Churchill, ensures that he is not immediately killed. With Churchill's help, Jack escapes from the barn where he has been held prisoner. During the escape, he rides Turk into a masquerade at the Hotel d'Arcachon in a costume similar to that of Louis XIV. With the aid of St. George's rats he escapes without injury but destroys the ballroom and removes the hand of Etienne d'Arcachon.

Meanwhile, Eliza becomes heavily involved in the politics of Amsterdam, helping Knott Bolstrood and the Duke of Monmouth manipulate the trade of VOC stock. This causes a panic from which they profit. Afterwards, the French Ambassador in Amsterdam persuades Eliza to go to Versailles and supply him information about the French court. Eliza agrees after a brief encounter and falling-out with Jack. William of Orange learns of Eliza's mission and intercepts her, forcing her to become a double agent for his benefit and to give him oral sex. Meanwhile, Jack, with an injury caused by Eliza, departs on the slaving trip. The ship is captured by Barbary pirates, and the end of the book has Jack as a captured galley-slave.

=== Odalisque ===
This book returns to Daniel Waterhouse, who in 1685, has become a courtier to Charles II because of his role as Secretary of the Royal Society. He warns James II, still Duke of York, of his brother Charles' impending death, following which, Daniel quickly becomes an advisor to James II. He continues to be deeply involved with the English court, ensuring the passage of several bills which reduce restrictions on non-conformists despite his detraction from the Francophile court. Meanwhile, Eliza becomes the governess of a widowers' two children in Versailles. She catches the eye of Louis XIV and becomes the broker of the French nobility. With her help, the French court, supported by King Louis, creates several market trends from which they profit extensively. Her active involvement in the French court gains her a title of nobility: Countess of Zeur.

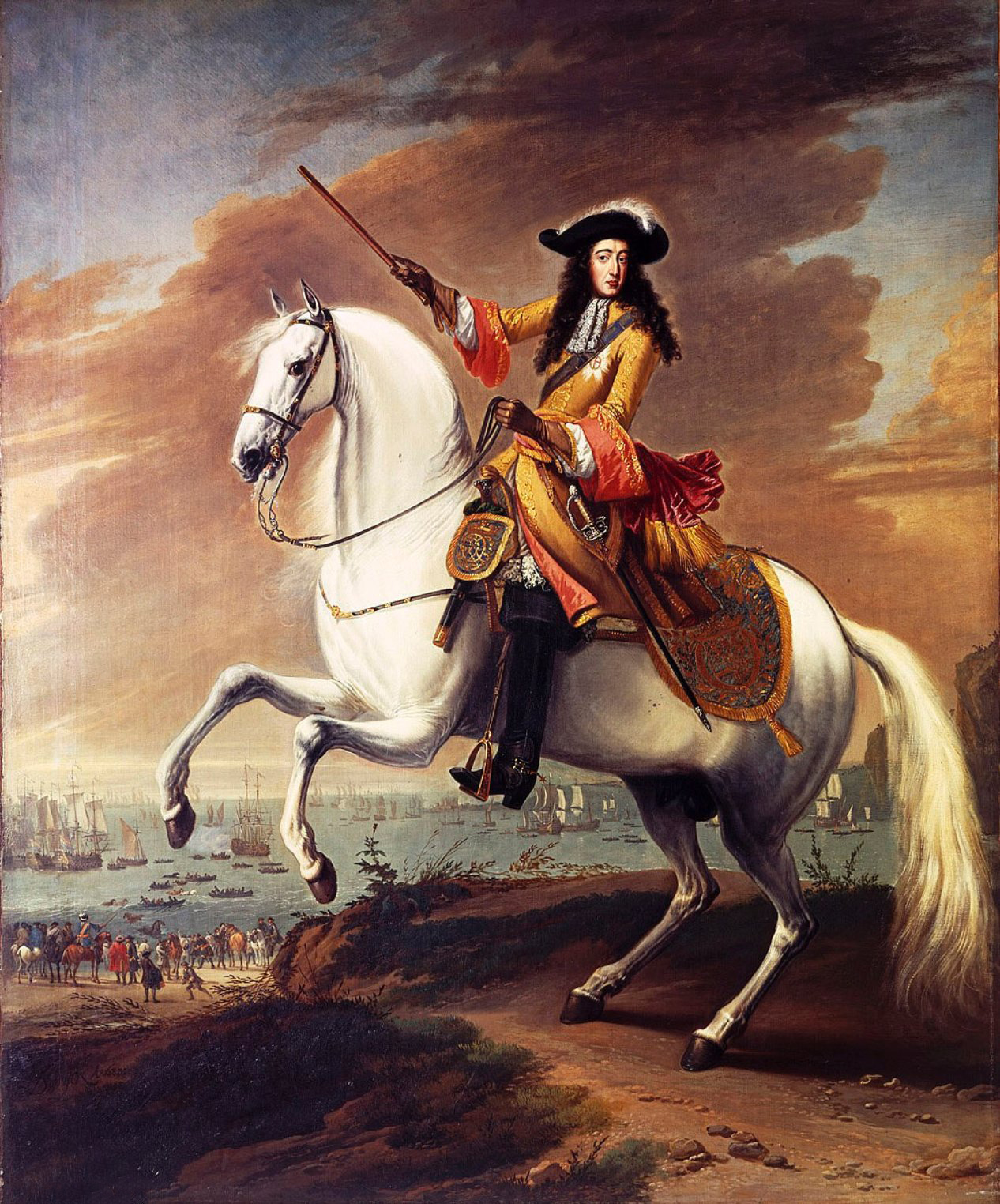
William of Orange leading troops at Brixham in Torbay, November 5, 1688, during the campaign that became The Glorious Revolution

Daniel and Eliza finally meet during a visit to the Netherlands where Daniel acts as an intermediary between William of Orange and the detracting English nobility. Daniel realizes Eliza's importance during a meeting at the house of Christiaan Huygens. Eliza woos Daniel and uses this connection to gain entrance into the English court and the Royal Society. Daniel also meets Nicholas Fatio while in Amsterdam. Soon after this meeting, Fatio and Eliza prevent the attempted kidnapping of William of Orange by an ambitious French courtier. Upon his return, Daniel is arrested by the notorious judge George Jeffreys, and later imprisoned in the Tower of London. Daniel escapes with the help of Jack Shaftoe's brother Bob, whose infantry unit is stationed there.

After a brief return to Versailles, Eliza joins Elizabeth Charlotte of the Palatinate at her estate before the invasion of the Palatinate in her name. Eliza informs William of Orange of the troop movements caused by the French invasion which frees his forces along the border of the Spanish Netherlands, a region of stalemate between France and the Dutch Republic. During her flight from the Electorate of the Palatinate, Eliza becomes pregnant by Louis's cryptographer, though popular knowledge suggested it was the French nobleman Etienne D'Arcachon's child. Meanwhile, William takes the free troops from the border on the Spanish Netherlands to England, precipitating the Glorious Revolution, including the expulsion of James II.

James II flees London and Daniel Waterhouse soon encounters him in a bar. Convinced that the Stuart monarchy has collapsed, Daniel returns to London and takes revenge on Jeffreys by inciting a crowd to capture him for trial and later execution. Though he plans to depart for Massachusetts, Daniel's case of bladder stones increasingly worsens during this period. The Royal Society and other family friends are very aware of this and force Daniel to get the stone removed by Robert Hooke at Bedlam.

== Major themes ==
A 2003 interview in Newsweek quotes Stephenson's belief that "science fiction... is fiction in which ideas play an important part." Central to Quicksilver is the importance of the Enlightenment. By placing the reader among a world of ideas that change the course of science, Stephenson explores the development of the scientific method. One theme Stephenson explores in Quicksilver is the advancement of mathematical sciences which in turn led to important applications: Leibniz's theory of binary mathematics became the foundation upon which to develop computers. As he did in Cryptonomicon, Stephenson highlights the importance of networks and codes, which in Quicksilver occur against a "backdrop of staggering diversity and detail", writes Mark Sanderson in his review of the book for the Daily Telegraph. Also, returning to his cyberpunk roots, Stephenson emphasizes the manner in which information and ideas are dispersed in complex societies. Quicksilver uses the "interactions of philosophy, court intrigue, economics, wars, plagues and natural disasters" of the late 17th and early 18th century to create a historical backdrop. From one perspective, the characters are most useful in their roles as "carriers of information". Although the characters use various techniques to disseminate information, the most prominent is cryptography. Elizabeth Weisse writes in USA Today that the use of cryptography is "Stephenson's literary calling card", as she compares Quicksilver to Cryptonomicon.

In Quicksilver Stephenson presents the importance of freedom of thought, the diversity required for new ideas to develop, and the manner in which new ideas are expressed. To explore or accept an idea such as the theory of gravity often resulted in dire consequences or even "grotesque punishment" in the early 17th century. Stephenson also points out that research, particularly as conducted at the Royal Society, resulted in a changing of views in some cases:

If you read the records of the Royal Society and what they were doing in the 1660s, it's clear that at a certain point, some of these people – and I think Hooke was one of them – became a little bit disgusted with themselves and began excusing themselves when one of these vivisections was going to happen. I certainly don't think they turned into hardcore animal rights campaigners, or anything close to that, but I think after a while, they got a little bit sick of it and started to feel conflicted about what they were doing. So I've tried to show that ambivalence and complication in the book.

How to exist during a "time of dualities" is another important theme in Quicksilver, especially in their effects on Daniel Waterhouse, who is torn between "reason versus faith, freedom versus destiny, matter versus math."

Frequent mention of alchemy indicates the shift from an earlier age to a newer transformative age. Newton was an alchemist, and one character compares finance to alchemy: "all goods—silk, coins, shares in mines—lose their hard dull gross forms and liquefy, and give up their true nature, as ores in an alchemist's furnace sweat mercury". The book focuses on a period of social and scientific transmutations, expanding upon the symbolism of the book's title, Quicksilver, because it is a period in which the "principles governing transformation" are investigated and established. A commerce of different goods rapidly changing from one into another is a recurrent theme throughout the book. Also, the title Quicksilver connects the book to the method alchemists used to distill quicksilver, "the pure living essence of God's power and presence in the world", from, as one character put it, "the base, dark, cold, essentially fecal matter of which the world was made."

== Characters ==
=== Main characters ===
In order of appearance:

- Enoch Root – an elusive and mysterious alchemist who first appears at the beginning of the book and recurs throughout often in the company of Alchemists such as Newton and Locke.
- Daniel Waterhouse – son of prominent Puritan Drake Waterhouse, roommate of Isaac Newton, friend of Gottfried Leibniz, and prominent member of the Royal Society. Waterhouse is both a savant and a strict Puritan. As Quicksilver progresses he becomes more and more involved in the inner workings of British politics.
- "Half-Cocked" Jack Shaftoe – an English vagabond, known as "The King of the Vagabonds", who rescues Eliza and becomes the enemy of the Duke d'Arcachon.
- Eliza – a former harem slave who becomes a French countess, investor, and spy for William of Orange and Gottfried Leibniz. She originally became a slave when she and her mother were kidnapped from their homeland of Qwghlm by a European pirate with breath that smelled of rotten fish.

=== Historical characters ===
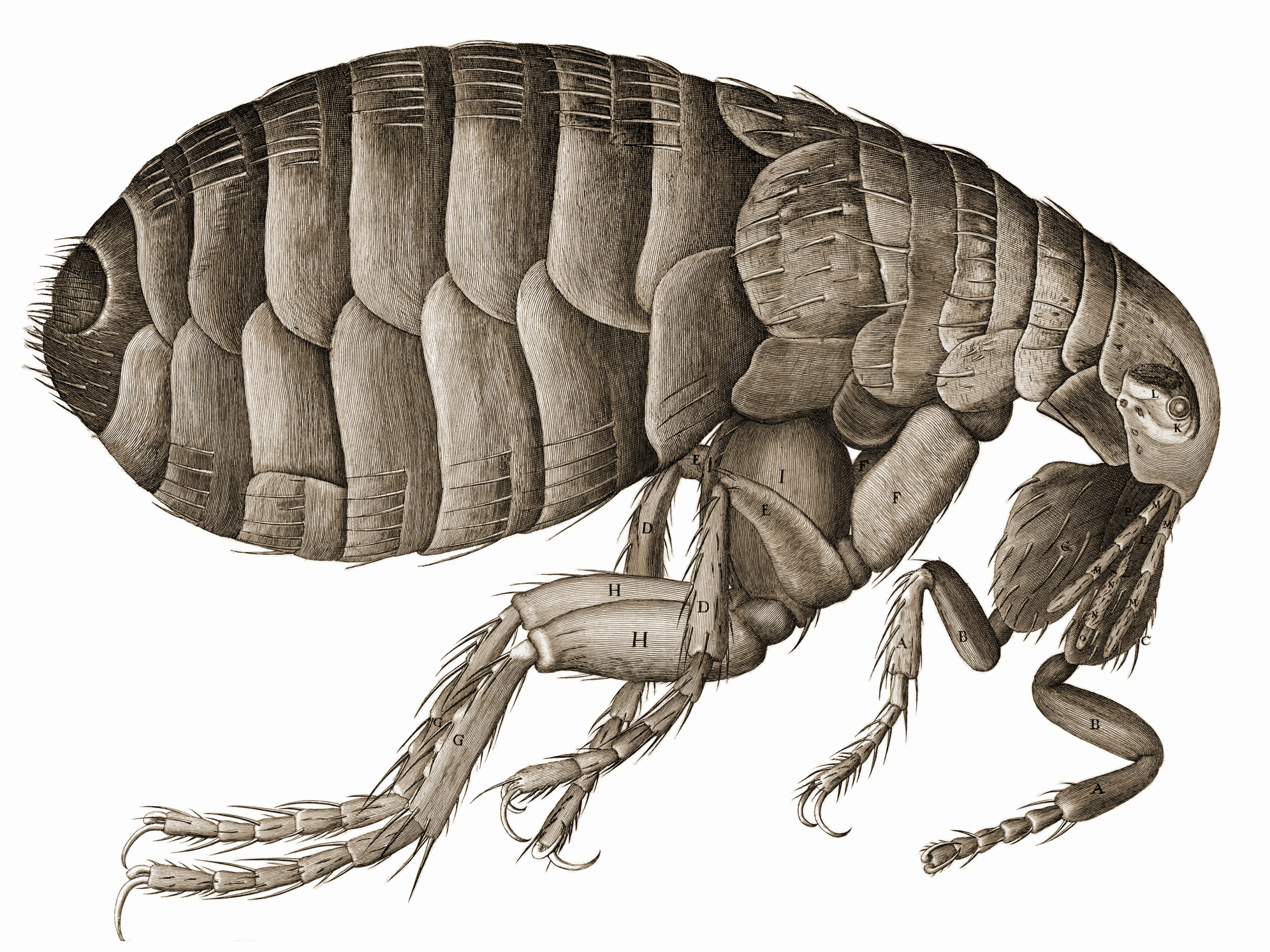
A figure from Robert Hooke's Micrographia, which appears as an illustration at the bottom of page 122 in the Perennial ed.

- Robert Boyle, Irish natural philosopher
- Caroline of Ansbach, an inquisitive child who loses her mother to smallpox
- John Churchill, former employer of Jack and a prominent British politician
- William Curtius, German Fellow of the Royal Society, and diplomat for the House of Stuart.
- Nicolas Fatio de Duillier
- Judge Jeffreys, Lord Chancellor of England
- Robert Hooke, English natural philosopher and biologist
- Christiaan Huygens, continental natural philosopher
- Gottfried Leibniz
- Louis XIV, King of France
- Isaac Newton
- Henry Oldenburg, founding member and secretary of the Royal Society
- Bonaventure Rossignol, a French cryptologist
- James Scott, 1st Duke of Monmouth
- James Stuart, as the Duke of York and as James II, King of England
- Edward Teach, aka Blackbeard
- John Wilkins, Bishop of Chester, founding member of the Royal Society, and advocate of religious tolerance in Britain
- William III of England, as William, Prince of Orange
- Benjamin Franklin
- Samuel Pepys

== Critical reception ==
The reception to Quicksilver was generally positive. Some reviewers found the length cumbersome; however, others found the length impressive in its quality and entertainment value. Paul Boutin at Slate Magazine comments that Quicksilver offers an insight into how advanced and complicated science was during the age of "alchemists and microscope-makers"; and that the scientists of the period were "the forerunners of the biotech and nanotech researchers who are today's IT Geeks". Entertainment Weekly rates Quicksilver an A−, stating that the book "makes you ponder concepts and theories you initially thought you'll never understand". The critic finds a parallel between Stephenson's approach and a passage from the book describing an effort to put "all human knowledge ... in a vast Encyclopedia that will be a sort of machine, not only for finding old knowledge but for making new".

The Independent places emphasis on the comparisons between the story that evolves in Quicksilver and Stephenson's earlier novel Cryptonomicon, with the former "shaping up to be a far more impressive literary endeavour than most so-called 'serious' fiction. And it ends on a hell of a cliffhanger. No scholarly, and intellectually provocative, historical novel has been this much fun since The Name of the Rose". Patrick Ness considers Quicksilver to be "entertaining over an impossible distance. This isn't a book; it's a place to move into and raise a family." His review focuses on the scope of the material and humour inherent in Quicksilver. Mark Sanderson calls the novel an "astonishing achievement", and compares Quicksilver to "Thomas Pynchon's Mason & Dixon and Lawrence Norfolk's Lempriere's Dictionary." Although full of historical description and incredibly lengthy, Quicksilver is noticeably full of what Sanderson called "more sex and violence ... than any Tarantino movie". Stephenson balances his desire to respect the period with a need to develop a novel which entertains modern readers. In The Guardian, Steven Poole commented that 'Quicksilver was: "A great fantastical boiling pot of theories about science, money, war and much else, by turns broadly picaresque and microscopically technical, sometimes over-dense and sometimes too sketchy, flawed but unarguably magnificent, Quicksilver is something like a Restoration-era Gravity's Rainbow."

Polly Shulman of The New York Times finds Quicksilver hard to follow and amazingly complex but a good read. However she notes that the complicated and clunky dialogue between the characters is a distraction. She thinks a full appreciation of the work is only possible within the context of the remaining novels of The Baroque Cycle, and compares the novel to works by Dorothy Dunnett, William Gibson and Bruce Sterling, calling it "history-of-science fiction". In the post-publication review for The New York Times, Edward Rothstein remarks that the scope of the novel is at times detrimental: "Unfortunately, in this novelistic cauldron it can sometimes seem as if mercury's vapors had overtaken the author himself, as if every detail he had learned had to be anxiously crammed into his text, while still leaving the boundaries between fact and invention ambiguous". He considers the novel to be an "experiment in progress", although the historical background is compelling.

Deborah Friedell disliked Quicksilver. She mentions Stephenson's poor writing and his lack of knowledge of the literary tradition, which she considers to be because "the greatest influences upon Stephenson's work have been comic books and cartoons". She dislikes his use of anachronism, his failure to be literary and his general approach to historical fiction. She writes of Stephenson and the reviewers who reviewed the work in a positive manner:

Stephenson is decidedly not a prodigy; but his babe-in-the-woods routine has proved irresistible for some, who are hailing his seemingly innate ability to meld the products of exhaustive historical research with what they see as a brilliant, idiosyncratic sense of humor and adventure. Time's critic has declared that Stephenson has a "once-in-a-generation gift", and that Quicksilver "will defy any category, genre, precedent or label—except for genius". This is promotional copy disguised as literary criticism. There is nothing category-defying about this ridiculous book.

From the foreign press, the review in the Frankfurter Allgemeine points out the historical period of Quicksilver is one of the birth of science which corresponds with a period of language shift as English became the language of science. Moreover, the review focuses on Leibniz's principles of mathematics which Stephenson claims established the framework for modern computing.

== Publication history ==
Based on the success of Cryptonomicon, a New York Times bestseller with sales of about 300,000 copies, the initial print-run for Quicksilver was 250,000 copies. Five months before the release date, a web campaign was initiated to advertise the work. The novel was originally published in a single volume; in 2006 HarperCollins republished the books in three separate paperback volumes.

=== Editions ===
- September 23, 2003, US, William Morrow (ISBN 0-380-97742-7), hardback (first edition), 944 pages
- October 2, 2003, UK, Willian Heinemann (ISBN 0-434-00817-6), hardback
- 2003, UK, Willian Heinemann (ISBN 0-434-00893-1), paperback
- June 2004, US, William Morrow (ISBN 0-06-059933-2), hardback (Special Edition), 968 pages
- September 21, 2004, US, HarperCollins Perennial (ISBN 0-06-059308-3), trade edition, 927 pages
- October 2004, US HarperColllins (ISBN 9780060721619), CD, abridged audiobook, 22 hours 1 minute, narrated by Simon Prebble and Stina Nielson
- November 2004, US, HarperCollins (ISBN 9780060818043), MP3 release of the abridged audio CD
- Split into 3 volumes in 2006
  - Quicksilver, January 2006, US, HarperCollins (ISBN 9780060833169), mass market, 480 pages
  - The King of the Vagabonds, February 2006, US, HarperCollins (ISBN 9780060833176), mass market paperback, 400 pages
  - Odalisque, March 2006, US, HarperCollins (ISBN 9780060833183), mass market paperback, 464 pages

== See also ==
- The Age of Unreason cycle by Gregory Keyes has a similar approach to the period.
