= Casimirianum, Neustadt =

Historical Building in Germany

Coordinates: 49°21′13″N 8°08′04″E

Casimirianum
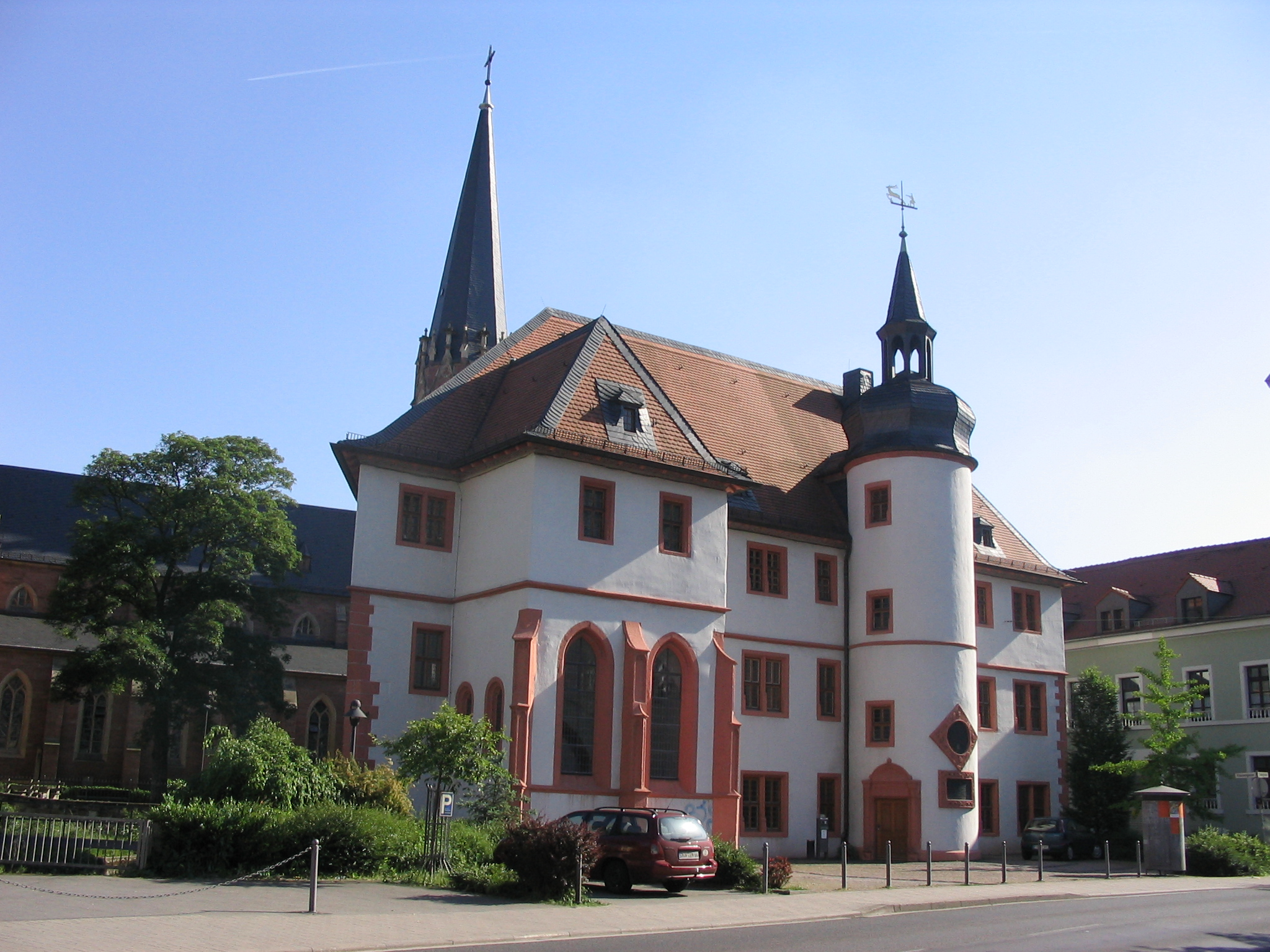
- Casimirianum in Neustadt
- Type: Reformed academy
- Active: 1578–1583
- Founder: Count Palatine Johann Casimir
- Religious affiliation: Calvinist
- Location: Neustadt, Rheinland-Pfalz, Germany

The Casimirianum in Neustadt an der Haardt (currently Neustadt an der Weinstraße, Rheinland-Pfalz) was a Reformed academy, which was founded in 1578 by Count Palatine Johann Casimir and named after him. The Casimirianum endured only five years. Today the name is used for the restored historical building that the Casmirianum occupied.

== Location ==
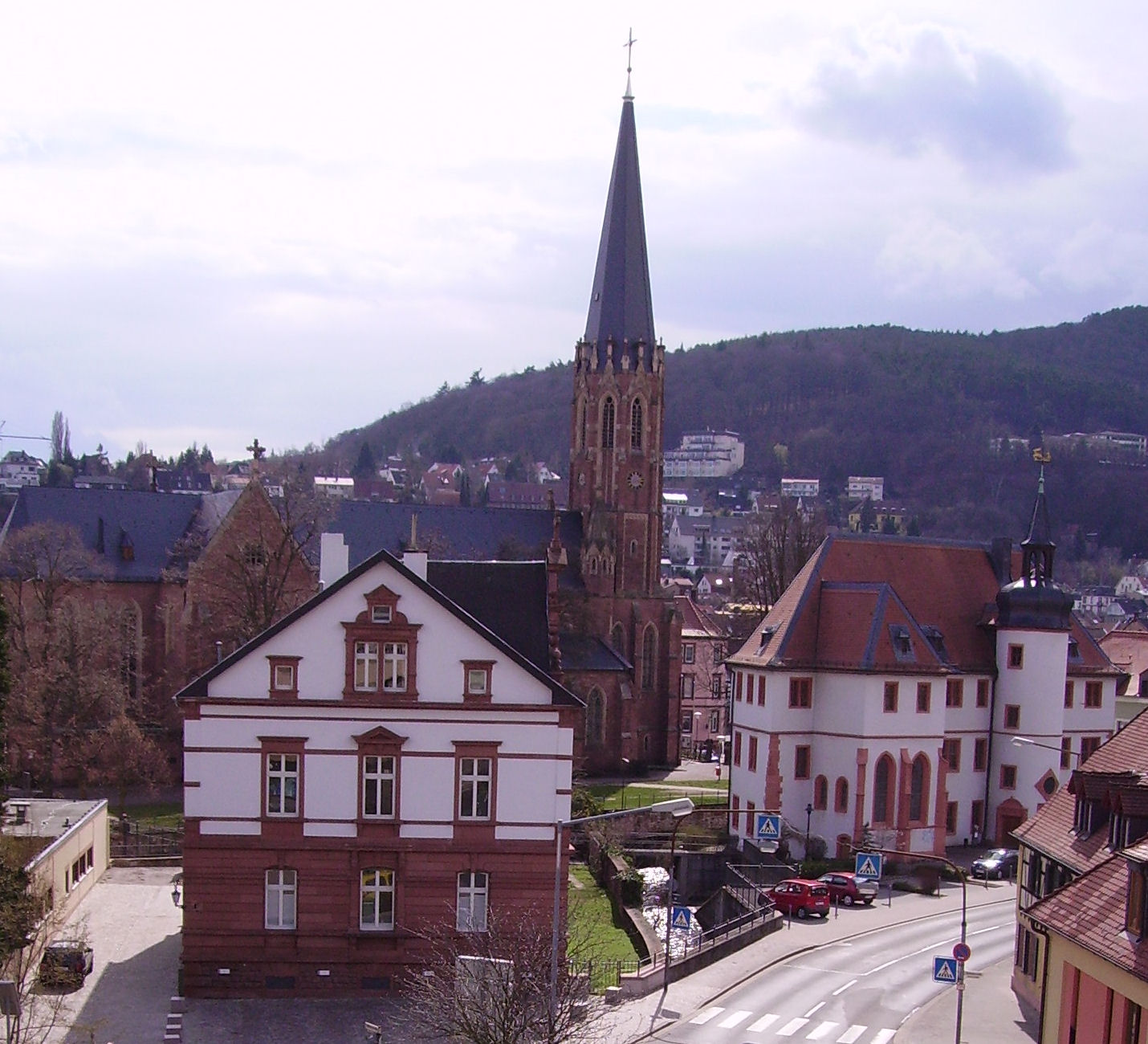
Casimirianum (right of the Marienkirche)

The Casimirianum is in the northwest of the town center of Neustadt on the Speyerbach river, close to the marketplace, Stiftskirche and Mariankirche.

== History ==
After the death of the Calvinist Elector Frederick III, the Pious, in 1576, his son and successor Elector Louis VI restored Lutheranism in the Palatinate. In time, all professors and students at the University of Heidelberg were forced to sign the Formula of Concord, which repudiated the Reformed confession. As an alternative university for those who refused to sign, and therefore were forced to leave Heidelberg, Count Palatine Johann Casimir – who unlike his older brother Ludwig was an adherent of the Reformed Church – created the Casimirianum.

The institution was erected in 1578/79 through the rebuilding and expansion of the "white cell," a building with Gothic and Renaissance features, which was part of the former Augustinian cloister. The university was equipped with Partikularschule and a Paedagogium (also called the “gymnasium illustre”) upstream to enable students to prepare for advanced studies. The university only remained in Neustadt for a few years; the faculty returned to Heidelberg in 1583/84 during Johann Casimir’s regency under Elector Frederick IV.

== Graduates ==
- Wilhelm von Curti (Sir William Curtius) FRS (1599 - 1678)

== Current situation ==
After its restoration in the late 20th century, the Casimirianum mainly is used today for cultural events.

The Kurfürst-Ruprecht-Gymnasium, the oldest high school in the city, evolved during the course 19th century from the tradition of Casimirianum on the basis of a Latin school. The other schools were founded over a hundred years later.
