= Sir William Curtius =

German diplomat (1598–1678)

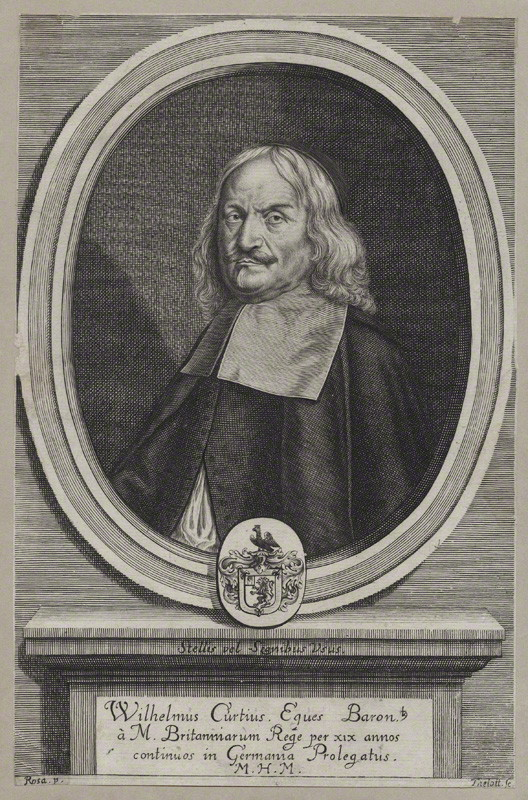
Wilhelmus Curtius, Baronet "Ambassador in Germany for His British Majesty for 19 Years"

John William Curtius (1598–1678), 1st Curtius Baronet of Sweden, FRS, was a diplomat representing the House of Stuart during the Thirty Years' War and the exile of Charles II. In later life, he served as Resident Ambassador of the English Crown in the Holy Roman Empire, and was head magistrate for two districts of the Electoral Palatinate.

The Curtius Baronetcy of Sweden was a title in the Baronetage of England created on 2 April 1652 for William Curtius, "Resident to the King of Sweden".

In Germany, Curtius was known as Johann Wilhelm von Curti, where from 1654 he lived in Castle Curti in Umstadt, Hesse.

== Diplomat of the Thirty Years' War ==
William Curtius worked as secretary and diplomat during the Thirty Years' War, promoting the cause of the Palatinate and the restoration of the fortunes of the heirs of the House of Stuart. His work for Queen Elizabeth included introducing her sons Charles Louis and Rupert to the English court, and working with and for English diplomats in the Stuart cause. During the Parliamentarian government and the interregnum in England, he was Elizabeth's secretary as she applied herself to the task of restoring the prospects of her family. He wrote her correspondence in three languages, visited the courts of Europe on her behalf as she tirelessly promoted the restoration of her son Charles Louis to as the Elector Palatine, supported her other sons in their military adventures in the English Civil war and in the Germanies, and secured good marriages and alliances for her daughters.

While based with the exiled Palatinate and English courts in The Hague, Curtius also became a financier, part of raising the extraordinary loans and cash payments that paid for the armies fighting across Europe.

In the second part of his life, Curtius took great advantage of the restoration of both the Palatinate and of Charles II of England. He married into a network of Dutch and Huguenot merchants and bankers, with strong connections to the French court and to the mayoralty of the city of Frankfurt. His administrative roles in the new Palatinate brought him feudal taxation rights there, and manorial residence and governorships in two counties (Amt). His support for the Stuarts was rewarded with a Baronetcy of England, a formal role as Britain's ambassador to the Holy Roman Empire, and membership of the Royal Society.

He remained a loyal and close supporter of Elizabeth until her death. One of his last voyages to England was to attend her funeral as one of the chief mourners.

However, the government of the United Kingdom moved on. Elizabeth's return to England and her death there was almost unnoticed by most. In the following century, Curtius' involvement in English politics was little known in Germany, and his German role poorly remembered in England.

A multi-lingual German diplomat based in The Hague, representing royal families and the interests of the Palatinate through decades of civil and inter-state wars, intrigues and religious strife, appears to have been too complicated and possibly too European to be well-remembered in any one country.

Curtius is better remembered in and around his hometown of Groß-Umstadt, where the Curtius name lives on in street names and the commemorative Curti-peal.

== Early life ==
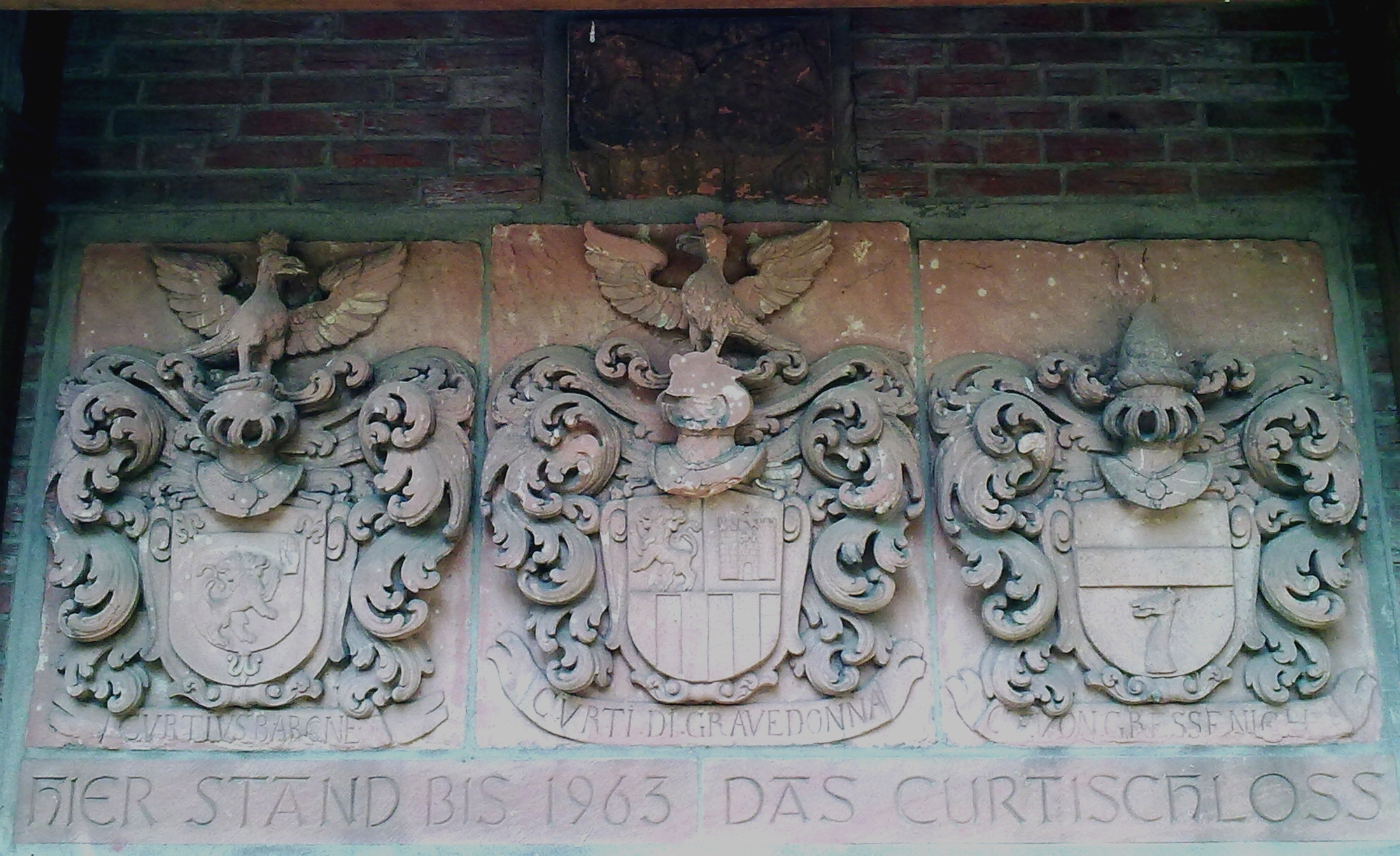
Coats of arms of the Curtius Baronets, the Curti di Gravedonna family, and of Sir William's first wife Anna von Gressenich. Moved from the Curti-Schloss (demolished 1963) to the walls of the school that is now on the site.

The di Curti family were Italian lower nobility, ex allobrogius from the Lombardian region around Gravedona. Protestant branches of the family moved along Lake Geneva and the river Rhine to the German area of the Electoral Palatinate.

Sir William's father settled at the city of Bensheim, where Curtius was born on 14 May 1598. He was baptized much later, on 12 August 1599, which even now results in confusion with the year of birth in literature.

William was the son of the Bensheim innkeeper, city councillor and wine merchant Wilhelm Kurtz (Curtius) († 1621), and his wife Anna Schuler. William Sr.'s father, Michael and his wife, Ursula Cruzia, probably came from the area around Geneva (ex Allobrogibus) and probably traced their ancestry from the Lombard noble family of the Curti di Gravedona.

On seeing his son's above-average talent, Curtius' father sent him to prepare for university studies in the Calvinist Collegium Casimirianum in Neustadt an der Haardt. His studies at the University of Heidelberg were disrupted by the initial events of the Thirty Years War. Curtius therefore moved to the Calvinist Herborn Academy in 1621, where he studied with Alstedius, "the Encyclopediast". After two years of study at Herborn, Curtius enrolled at the Academy of Geneva, the spiritual stronghold of the Reformed Church. In 1627, he enrolled at the Sorbonne. He concluded his studies at the University of Siena.

== English diplomat ==
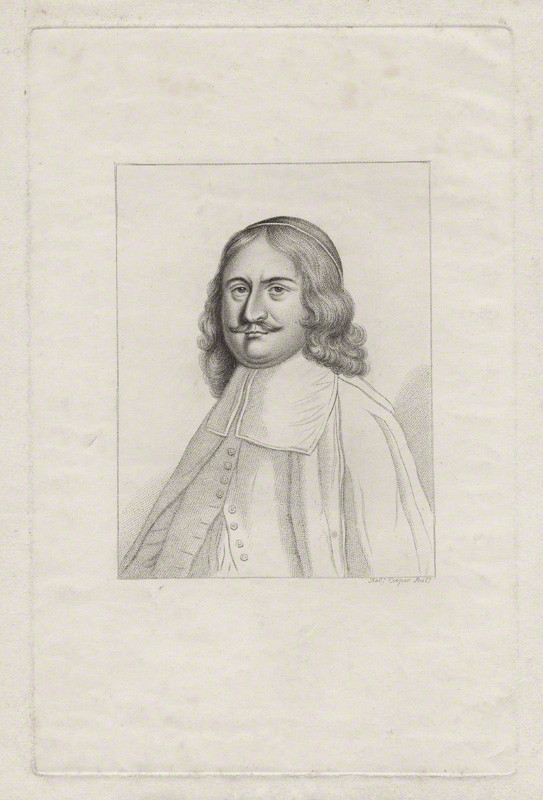
Sir William Curtius, 1st Bt by Robert Cooper, after Unknown artist. Stipple engraving, early 19th century. NPG D30756

Curtius' homeland the Palatinate was occupied by Habsburg and Catholic League forces early in the Thirty Years' War, shortly after the Holy Roman Emperor Ferdinand II decisively defeated the Elector Palatine Frederick V at the 1620 Battle of White Mountain and replaced him as King of Bohemia. The exiled Frederick and his wife Elizabeth Stuart received military and diplomatic support from the Protestant kingdoms of England and Scotland, ruled by Elizabeth's brother King Charles I. The successful 1630 invasion of the Holy Roman Empire by the Swedish King, Gustavus Adolfus, gave them new hope of reclaiming their Palatinate lands and their titles as King and Queen of Bohemia.

Curtius launched his diplomatic career as a secretary to Frederick in 1629, possibly on the recommendation of his friend Joachim, son of the Palatinate administrator Ludwig Camerarius.

In 1631, King Charles sent his senior courtier Henry Vane to the Swedish King to seek stronger support for the Palatine cause. William Curtius was employed by Vane as his secretary for the mission, Curtius carrying letters and messages between the key players. He returned from his first visit to England with letters from Charles recalling Vane but entrusting him to continue Vane's work, as though you by birth are a stranger yet having continued some yeares in Our dominions & been imployed under him [Vane] in all his negotiation & well approved your faithfulnes & ability. In return for a salary of 1,000 pounds per month, he was appointed as resident of the English Crown to the King of Sweden.

Curtius remained in Germany as an Agent of Charles I of England until November 1633.

It was in this English role that he was one of the last people to meet with the Elector Palatine in November 1632, when Frederick was already displaying early symptoms of the plague that killed him only days later.

== In the Palatine service ==
Curtius visited London several times during the 1630s.

In 1633, the Administrator of the Palatinate sent Curtius back to London to seek King Charles' financial support to raise garrisons for the Palatinate fortresses liberated by the Swedish. The project ended in disaster: Charles was so offended that he imprisoned Elizabeth's other secretary Francis Nethersole in the Tower of London.

Curtius was based in London into 1634, hoping to be further employed by the King. Elizabeth Stuart wrote to diplomat Sir William Boswell in his support:

I pray remember what I saide to you about Curtius that if the king my deare Brother will not keep him in his service, he may be dismissed with his favour, and the sooner the better for the poore man is there [in London] on his own purse and cannot be paid what is owing of him.

He attended a joint assembly of Protestant princes in Frankfurt in April. Late in the year, he returned to Elizabeth's exiled court at The Hague, having failed to secure material English support for the Palatinate cause.

Curtius was back in London in 1636 as chaperone for Elizabeth's teenage sons Charles Louis and Prince Rupert. He reported back to Elizabeth in great detail on discussions and negotiations that Charles Louis had had with King Charles and others, seeking funds and military support.

== English Resident in Germany ==
Curtis took up another official English role when Charles I appointed him as representative of England at the Imperial Diet of Nürnberg in 1639 and 1649, and at Frankfurt in 1642. Curtius also supported English diplomat Sir Thomas Roe in Vienna in 1641–42.

At the same time, Curtius represented Charles's nephew, Kurprinz Charles Louis, as a member of the Palatine Council working to have the Elector Palatine's lands returned to him.

Curtius was appointed by Charles I as official resident of the English Crown in the Holy Roman Empire in 1645, and confirmed in that role again by Charles II in 1649. In 1652, when he was appointed to the Baronetcy by the then-exiled Charles II, Curtius was "resident for his majesty, with Gustavus, King of Sweden, and the princes of Germany". Charles II described him as "borne in these partes, and long imployed there by our father of blessed memory"

On 5 August 1664, four years after Charles II's Restoration, Sir William was appointed Resident Ambassador at Frankfurt am Main, and remained so until recredentialled in September 1677.

== German governor ==
In 1648, the Palatinate was restored to Elizabeth's son, Charles Louis. Curtius, who had distinguished himself by cleverly negotiating French support to transfer Otzberg and Umstadt from Hesse-Darmstadt back to Palatinate control, was rewarded with a leading role in a new Palatinate Council to organise land ownership and governance.

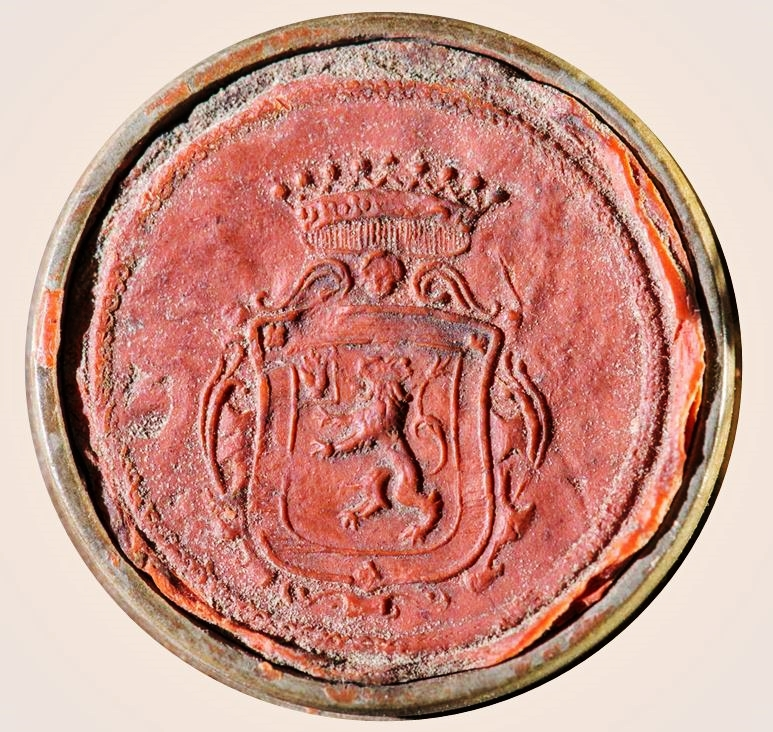
Seal of the Curtius Baronets from 1699; the small hand is from the Arms of Ulster, included as an inescutcheon on the armorial bearings of all English Baronets.

Curtius bought the overgrown estate Beinehof zu Lengfeld at the foot of the Otzberg. Shortly afterwards he was appointed Oberamtmann – Bailiff, or District Governor – in both Otzberg and Umstadt. At that time, half of Umstadt was owned by the Palatinate as a condominium with the changing successors of the Landgraviate of Hesse: the Landgraviate of Hesse-Darmstadt, Landgraviate of Hesse-Kassel and Hesse-Rheinfels.

Also during this time, he was appointed to the Imperial Nobility, the "Reichsadel".

In 1653, he bought a manor-house in the town of Umstadt and installed his coat of arms there. The property was developed into the 'Curti-Schloss'.

During these early years of Charles II's exile in France, Curtius returned to his former role as fund-raiser, this time seeking support from German princes for the exiled English King.

He returned briefly to England in 1661 to attend his Queen Elizabeth at the end of her life, and was at the top of her official list of mourners.

== Fellow of the Royal Society ==
Sir William was elected as a Fellow of the Royal Society on 3 October 1667. He corresponded with both Henry Oldenburg, the Secretary of the Society, and Gottfried Leibniz, bringing the latter a copy of Wilkin's Encyclopaedic Essay.

"Mr Oldenburg read a Latin letter to himself from Sir William Curtius dated at Umbstad December 2, 1668 containing assurances of his willingnese to send what philosophical communications he could out of Germany and particularly from the Elector of Mentz and from the physician of the Landgrave of Hesse Darmstadt. This letter was ordered to be entered in the Letter Book."

== Family and legacy ==
Curtius may have lost a family during the Thirty Years' War. On his return to the Palatinate, he married Catharina Fabricius gennant von Gressinich; her father Peter Fabricius was a Palatinate judge, her mother Anna Hoeufft was sister to Jan Hoeufft, the Dutch treasurer of Louis XIV of France. They had five children together.

After Catharina's death in childbirth in 1659, Curtius married the widow of the mayor of Frankfurt, Anna Sibylla von Stalburg, who was born to a Viennese banking family.

His son Sir Johann William succeeded as the second Baronet Curtius and as Oberamtmann in Umstadt from 1681 to 1691.

Since 1785, the church in the village of Wald-Amorbach, Breuberg has rung its bells at 10 am daily in the "Curti-Peal" for the salvation of the von Curti family.

== In popular culture ==
In the novel Quicksilver, Neal Stephenson quotes from The History of the Royal Society of London, in which "the president produced from Sir William Curtius a hairy ball found in the belly of a cow".

Baronetage of England
New title	Baronet (of Sweden); 1652–1678	Succeeded by Sir Carl William Curtius
