= Trial of the Pyx =

Judicial ceremony in the United Kingdom

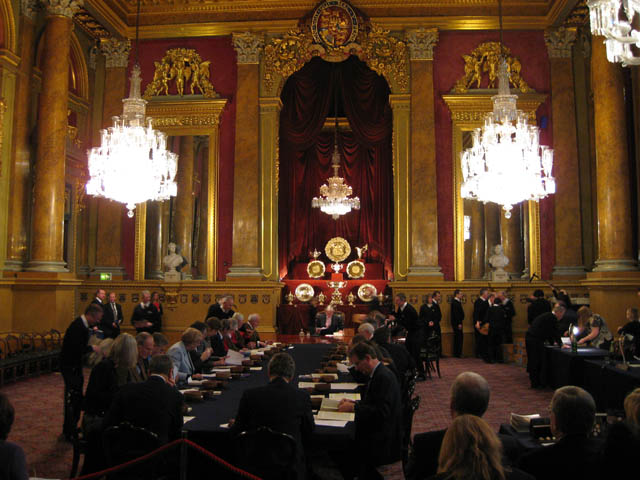
Trial of the Pyx in the Livery Hall at Goldsmiths' Hall

The Trial of the Pyx (/pɪks/) is a judicial ceremony in the United Kingdom to ensure that newly minted coins from the Royal Mint conform to their required dimensional and fineness specifications. Although modern coin quality is tested throughout the year under laboratory conditions, the event has become an annual historic tradition. Each year, thousands of coins are put on trial, consisting of both those struck for circulation and non-circulating commemorative coins.

First held in the 12th century, the event formerly took place in the Court of Exchequer; since 1870 it has been held in the hall of the Worshipful Company of Goldsmiths in London, where the Deputy Master of the Mint (Chief Executive of the Royal Mint) is in effect put on trial before a High Court judge as metallurgical assayers and selected leaders from the financial world sample coins from the mint's output. The boxes in which coins are stored form the ceremony's namesake: the word pyx derives from the Greek πυξίς, pyxis meaning 'wooden box'.

== History ==
According to records from the Dialogus de Scaccario, in 1179 the weight and fineness of coinage received by England's Exchequer was routinely examined for regulatory purposes under the supervision of the Barons of the Exchequer. The earliest surviving record of a distinct public trial of the coins of the realm dates from 24 February 1248: although not a Trial of the Pyx in the full sense, it was held before the Barons of the Exchequer with a jury of twelve "discreet and lawful citizens of London" and twelve "skilful goldsmiths of the same place".

In 1279 the various Royal Mints, found in different parts of the Kingdom, were consolidated and placed under the authority of a single Master of the Mint. The Red Book of the Exchequer includes a section, thought to have been written in May 1279, titled "forma nova monete" ("A new form of currency"). This set forth procedures for a regular series of trials whereby the Master of the Mint was made liable for failings in the currency standards. He was ordered to put aside one coin for every ten pounds of silver minted, to be kept in a box with two keys (one held by the master, the other by the warden), which would be brought by the King's Assayer to the Exchequer four times a year for the testing. By the same ordinance it was enjoined that a standard coin should be made, and deposited at the Exchequer, against which these newly-minted coins would be measured (according to form and quality). In 1275 the quality of silver to be used for coinage of the realm had been set at 11 oz 2¼ dwt of fine silver and 17¾ dwt of alloy in every 12-ounce Tower pound of metal.

In 1282, in the reign of Edward I, a writ was issued ordering barons (of the Exchequer) to carry out an assay of the coinage of the realm 'in such manner as the King's Council were wont to do' (implying that this was far from being the first such trial). In 1290, a standard set of gold and silver plates, certified as being of a specified purity, were deposited at the Exchequer to serve as a benchmark in the trials of coinage. They were stored in a box called the pyx and kept in what came to be known as the Pyx Chamber, off the East Cloister of Westminster Abbey. They were stored behind double doors with multiple locks; the keys to the outer doors were kept by the Chamberlains of the Exchequer, and those to the inner doors by the Clerk to the Treasurer of England (later termed the Auditor of the Receipt of the Exchequer). These officers were not permitted to remove the standard pieces unless authorised to do so by a warrant from the Chancellor of the Exchequer.

The Trial of the Pyx is said to have been established on a formal (rather than a customary) basis in 1345, by an indenture made between King Edward III and Perceval de Perche, the Master of the Mint. It continued for the most part to take place regularly, once every three months, up until the reign of Elizabeth I; afterwards it was held more sporadically. In the early 17th century it was still usual for the monarch to attend the Trial of the Pyx in person.

Up until 1870 there was no statutory authority for the Trial; it took place by Royal authority (after the Restoration this was generally exercised through the Privy Council, acting on the advice of the Chancellor of the Exchequer).

Nowadays, the statutory basis for the Trial of the Pyx is the Coinage Act 1971, the latest in a long series of similarly named Acts of Parliament. Specific procedures are established by Order in Council, the most recent being the Trial of the Pyx Order 1998, which was amended in 2005, 2012 and 2016. It is not required for a new Order to be issued for each Trial: this is required only to implement regulatory revision.

Prior to the Coinage Act 1870 trials took place at the Palace of Westminster and coins were stored in Westminster Abbey's Pyx Chamber. The Act moved the venue for the trial to Goldsmiths' Hall, the headquarters of the Worshipful Company of Goldsmiths who carry out the testing. In 2026, however, the trial took place in the Mansion House, Goldsmiths' Hall being closed for refurbishment (an legal amendment introduced in 1998 permits the trial to be held in any suitable location within the City of London).

== Procedure ==
Every year around February, the event begins with a meeting held in Goldsmiths' Hall. Attending the gathering are the Prime Warden of the Goldsmiths' Company, three of their supporting Wardens, the Head of the Assay Office, Liverymen, The Deputy Master of the Mint and the King's Remembrancer. The presiding judge is the King's Remembrancer (or Queen's Remembrancer when the reigning monarch is female), the Senior Master of the King's Bench. It is his or her responsibility to ensure that the trial be held in accordance with the law and to deliver the jury's final verdict to His Majesty's Treasury. Where and when a trial is to take place is at the Treasury's discretion, though there must be a trial in any year during which the Royal Mint issues coins.

Coins to be tested are drawn from the regular production of the Royal Mint. The Deputy Master of the Mint must, throughout the year, randomly select several thousand sample coins and place them aside for the Trial. These must be in a certain fixed proportion to the number of coins produced. For example, for every 5,000 bimetallic coins issued, one must be set aside, whereas for silver Maundy money the proportion is one in 150.

The jury is composed of at least six assayers from the Company of Goldsmiths. They have two months to test the provided coins, and decide whether they have been properly minted. Criteria are given for diameter, chemical composition and weight for each class of coinage. Depending on the number of coins being assayed there are a varying number of jurors needed. Sitting along a table, the jurors are handed packets of up to 50 coins, by a Royal Mint official, which they must count. Each juror selects one coin from the pile, places it in a copper bowl and it is then sent to be assayed. The remaining coins are either sent to be weighed or weighed at the table. Smaller denomination coins that are more numerous are counted by machine.

At the company's assay office, the coins which were placed in the copper bowls are melted down and formed into plates where their fineness and weight can be compared against a corresponding trial plate which acts as a benchmark. After two months of testing, a ceremony presided over by the King's Remembrancer is held, when the final verdict is given. Attending the event and receiving the verdict under the capacity as Master of the Mint is the Chancellor of the Exchequer or their Deputy Master, the Chief Executive of the Royal Mint.

If the coinage is found to be substandard, the trial carries a punishment for the Master of the Mint of a fine, removal from office, or imprisonment. The last master of the mint to be punished was Isaac Newton in 1696, though he later showed that the mistake originated in a faulty reference.

== List of trials ==
Prior to the Coinage Act 1971 which ordered a trial to be held at least once a year, trials were carried out in no particular order and often covered the coinage of multiple years.

=== Dates of trials ===
- 1281
- 1312
- 1318
- 30 October 1349
- 30 October 1362
- 30 October 1365
- 18 February 1414
- 14 October 1425
- 14 October 1427
- 27 October 1432
- 1 November 1432
- 1 December 1475
- 26 October 1523
- 4 June 1527
- 21 November 1527
- 20 May 1530
- 1 March 1533
- 30 October 1534
- 16 June 1542

=== Trials during the reign of Elizabeth II ===
Trials were held in every calendar year of the reign of Elizabeth II, starting in 1952.

Year	No. of coins tested	Refs.
1993	60,000	
2009	81,829	
2011	81,829	Mint report 2011–12
2014	40,000	
2015	70,000	
2016	95,000	
2017	35,000	
2020	23,000	

=== Trials during the reign of Charles III ===
Year	No. of coins tested	Refs.
2024	7,960	
2025	6,432	

== See also ==
- Halsbury's Laws of England
- United States Assay Commission, which performed a similar function in that country
- The historical novel The System of the World by Neal Stephenson contains a detailed scene that covers the stages of a Trial of the Pyx conducted in 1714.
