= Catherine Barton =

English homemaker

Catherine Conduitt (Catherine Barton)
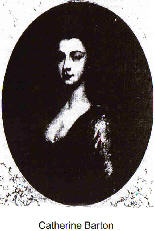
- Catherine as a young woman
- Born: Catherine Barton; 1679
- Died: 1739 (aged 59–60)
- Known for: Being a renowned "society wit and beauty", telling the story of Newton and the apple to Voltaire, possible affair with politician Charles Montagu
- Spouse: John Conduitt
- Relatives: Robert Barton (father); Hannah Smith (mother); Isaac Newton (uncle)

Catherine Barton (1679–1739) was an English woman who oversaw the running of the household of her uncle, scientist Isaac Newton. She was reputed to be the source of the story of the apple inspiring Newton's work on gravity, and his papers came to her on his death. She was rumoured to have been the mistress of the poet and statesman Charles Montagu and later married politician John Conduitt.

== Early life ==
Barton was the second daughter of Robert Barton (1630–1693) and his second wife, Hannah Smith (1652–1695), half-sister of Isaac Newton. She was baptized at Brigstock, Northampton on 25 November 1679.

== Barton's social circle ==
Barton was remarked upon by several men to be beautiful, witty and clever. She was known as a brilliant conversationalist, and attracted the admiration of such famous figures as Jonathan Swift and Voltaire.

Her uncle was also fond of her; an excerpt of an uncharacteristically warm letter from Newton survives, regarding her contraction of smallpox: "Pray let me know by your next how your face is and if your fevour be going. Perhaps warm milk from ye Cow may help to abate it. I am Your loving Unkle, Is. Newton." Sometime after her uncle Newton moved to London to become Warden of the Mint in April 1696 she moved there to live with him. Barton was said to have been the source of the story about Newton and the apple, as she told the story to Voltaire who later wrote about it in his Essay on Epic Poetry of 1727.

Voltaire also insinuated that Newton's preferment to the Royal Mint was the result of Barton's alleged affair with Charles Montagu. However, although it is true that Isaac was appointed under the patronage of Charles Montagu, the claim that this was due to Barton's influence is dubious: Catherine Barton came up to London and met Montagu after the appointment, not before.

== Relationship to Charles Montagu ==
Barton became the housekeeper to Charles Montagu following the death of his wife in 1698. There was much contemporary gossip about their relationship being sexual, and thinly disguised accusations appeared in print. Delariviere Manley's Memoirs of 1710 featured a character called Bartica who was widely taken to represent Barton.

Montagu, by then Earl of Halifax, died of an inflammation of the lungs in May 1715. His will contained two codicils: the first dated 12 April 1706, left the sum of £3000 and all his jewels to Barton; a second dated 1 February 1713 left her an additional £5000 plus his interest in the rangership of Bushey Park and his manor of Apscourt in Surrey to pay for the repairs to Bushey Lodge. On 30 August, however, he revoked the first codicil and begged his executor, his nephew George Montagu, not to make a dispute over her legacies. Montagu wrote that these bequests were "as a token of the sincere love, affection and esteem, I have long had for her person, and as a small recompense for the pleasure and happiness I have had in her conversation".

Halifax's official life defended Barton against accusations that she might have been sexually involved with him, stating:

as this Lady was young, beautiful and gay, so those that were given to censure, pass'd a Judgment upon her which she no Ways merited, since she was a Woman of strict Honour and Virtue; and tho' she might be agreeable to his Lordship in every Particular, that noble Peer's Complaisance to her, proceeded wholly from the great Esteem he had for her Wit and most exquisite Understanding.

Based on the generosity of the bequest, astronomer John Flamsteed wrote, apparently sarcastically and spitefully, that Barton must have "excellent conversation".

== Marriage ==
Barton then returned to live with her uncle at his home in St Martin's Street. On 9 July 1717 she became engaged to marry John Conduitt who had arrived in England a few weeks earlier in May of that year. On 23 August they were issued a licence to marry at St Paul's Covent Garden, but actually married three days later at St Martin in the Fields. Barton had one daughter with Conduitt, Catherine, who was born in 1721.

== Later life ==
Barton lived with Conduitt at Cranbury Park, near Winchester. She took in Newton towards the end of his life, and he resided with her until his death in 1727. After Newton's death, his papers were in Barton's care and then passed down through her family until 1936 when they were auctioned at Sotheby's.

Conduitt died on 23 May 1737; Catherine died in 1739 and was buried with her husband in Westminster Abbey, where her uncle had also been buried. Their only daughter and heir, Catherine, married John Wallop, Viscount Lymington, the eldest son of the first Earl of Portsmouth, and their son, John Wallop, succeeded as second Earl of Portsmouth.

== In fiction ==
A fictional Barton has a small role in Neal Stephenson's novel The System of the World, the final installment in Stephenson's Baroque Cycle.

She also has a role in Philip Kerr's novel Dark Matter: The Private Life of Sir Isaac Newton, and Jeremy Scholtz's The Apple and The Infinite.
