= Jack Shaftoe =

- Created by: Neal Stephenson

In-universe information
- Aliases: King of the Vagabonds; L'Emmerdeur; Half-Cocked Jack; Quicksilver; Ali Zaybak; Sword of Divine Fire; Jack the Coiner
- Relatives: Bob Shaftoe (brother)

Jack Shaftoe (also known, at various points, as King of the Vagabonds, L'Emmerdeur, Half-Cocked Jack, Quicksilver, Ali Zaybak, Sword of Divine Fire, and Jack the Coiner) is one of the three primary fictional characters in Neal Stephenson's 2,686-page, Clarke Award-winning epic trilogy, The Baroque Cycle.

Born in 1660 to a poor London family, Jack, the youngest of three half-brothers, becomes a mudlark at the age of five, abandoning this then-common criminal enterprise shortly thereafter when his eldest half-brother Dick is drowned during a failed raid on a Dutch galjoot in the Thames. After several years working as an impromptu assistant to men about to be hanged by Jack Ketch from the Treble Tree in Tyburn, Jack leaves England to become a vagabond in continental Europe. Much of The Baroque Cycle concerns Jack's adventures in (among other ports-of-call) England, France, Germany, Austria, The Barbary Coast, Egypt, India, Japan, the Philippines, and Mexico between the years 1683 and 1714.

In its 2004 review of The Confusion, The Guardian called the character of Jack Shaftoe "magnificent ... a swashbuckling hero with a foul mouth and few morals." The Village Voice has translated one of the more commonly used fictional sobriquets used to describe Shaftoe, l'emmerdeur, as "he who fucks shit up."

== Characterization ==
Shaftoe is illiterate until his later years and slightly mad, having contracted syphilis at a time when it was still untreatable. Nevertheless, he is depicted by Stephenson as a daring, charismatic, clever, and resourceful man. While he's possessed by an almost pathological impulsiveness, denominated by his brother Bob "The Imp of the Perverse," Jack also exhibits a surprising capacity for loyalty, mercy, and even, at times, mawkish sentimentality.

During the fifty-four years of European history traced by The Baroque Cycle, Jack loves only one woman, Eliza de la Zeur, the rescued harem-slave turned English Duchess/French Countess (though Jack fathers two children in the early 1680s, Danny and Jimmy, by Irishwoman Mary Dolores Partry, who dies shortly thereafter). Jack spends much of the period between 1683 and 1714 either fighting for his life or attempting to earn, from a great distance, the love and respect of Eliza; often these endeavors are concurrent. His late 17th-century/early 18th-century exploits as a street urchin, mercenary soldier, vagabond, errand-boy, merchant, galley-slave, pirate, petty despot, spy, coiner, and terrorist in the employ of King Louis XIV are the subject, in the world of Stephenson's epic, not only of much of the text proper but also of widely popular picaresque novels read by various characters in the story.

Shaftoe is a distant ancestor of a number of characters appearing in Stephenson's earlier novel, Cryptonomicon, including Bobby Shaftoe, Douglas MacArthur Shaftoe, America "Amy" Shaftoe, Marcus Aurelius Shaftoe, Robin Shaftoe, and presumably the mysterious "Uncle Jack" Shaftoe.

== See also ==
- Main Characters of the Baroque Cycle
