= German submarine U-691 =

German World War II submarine

History

Nazi Germany
- Name: U-691
- Ordered: 2 April 1942
- Builder: Howaldtswerke, Hamburg
- Yard number: 840
- Fate: Contract suspended on 30 September 1943; Cancelled on 22 July 1944

General characteristics
- Class & type: Type VIIC/41 submarine

German submarine U-691 was a Type VIIC/41 U-boat of Nazi Germany's Kriegsmarine during World War II. Her construction by Howaldtswerke of Hamburg was ordered on 2 April 1942, suspended on 30 September 1943, and cancelled on 22 July 1944. The new Elektro Boat XXI design had made the Type VIIs obsolete.

== In fiction ==
Neal Stephenson's novel Cryptonomicon includes a fictitious U-691, a Type IXD/42, launched at Wilhelmshaven on 19 September 1940 (four years before IXD/42s were actually developed) and fitted with an experimental schnorkel.

== Bibliography ==
- Busch, Rainer; Röll, Hans-Joachim (1999). German U-boat commanders of World War II : a biographical dictionary. Translated by Brooks, Geoffrey. London, Annapolis, Md: Greenhill Books, Naval Institute Press. ISBN 1-55750-186-6.
- Busch, Rainer; Röll, Hans-Joachim (1999). Der U-Boot-Krieg, 1939-1945: Deutsche U-Boot-Verluste von September 1939 bis Mai 1945 [German U-boat losses from September 1939 to May 1945] (in German). Vol. IV. Hamburg, Berlin, Bonn: Mittler. ISBN 3-8132-0514-2.
- Gröner, Eric; Jung, Dieter; Maass, Martin (1991). German Warships 1815-1945: U-boats and Mine Warfare Vessels. Vol. 2. Translated by Thomas, Keith; Magowan, Rachel. London: Conway Maritime Press. ISBN 0-85177-593-4.
