= Robert Shafto =

Robert Shafto may refer to:

- Robert Shafto (1690–1729), English politician, Member of Parliament (MP) for the City of Durham 1712–1713, 1727–1730
- Bobby Shafto (1732–1797), English MP for Durham 1760–1768, and for Downton 1780–1790
- Robert Eden Duncombe Shafto (1776–1848), MP for the City of Durham 1804–1806
- Robert Duncombe Shafto (1796–1888), English politician, MP for North Durham 1847–1888

== See also ==
- Robert "Bobby" Shaftoe, protagonist of Neal Stephenson's novel Cryptonomicon
