= The System of the World (novel) =

2004 novel by Neal Stephenson

- Author: Neal Stephenson
- Language: English
- Series: The Baroque Cycle
- Genre: Historical novel
- Publisher: William Morrow
- Publication date: September 21, 2004
- Publication place: United States
- Media type: Print (hardback & paperback)
- Pages: 912 (first edition, hardback)
- ISBN: 0-06-052387-5 (first edition, hardback)
- OCLC: 55036877
- Dewey Decimal: 813/.54 22
- LC Class: PS3569.T3868 S97 2004
- Preceded by: The Confusion

The System of the World is a novel by Neal Stephenson and the third and final volume in The Baroque Cycle. The title alludes to the third volume of Isaac Newton's Philosophiae Naturalis Principia Mathematica, which bears the same name.

The System of the World won the Locus Award for Best Science Fiction Novel and the Prometheus Award in 2005, as well as a receiving a nomination for the Arthur C. Clarke Award the same year.

== Plot ==
=== Solomon's Gold ===
Daniel Waterhouse returns to England from his "Technologickal College" project in Boston in order to try to resolve the feud between Isaac Newton and Gottfried Leibniz over who invented calculus. Someone attempts to assassinate him with an "Infernal Device" (a time bomb), and Waterhouse forms a club to find out who did it and prosecute them. It later turns out that the bomb was intended for his friend Isaac Newton.

Jack Shaftoe, under the alias Jack the Coiner, attempts a heist at the Tower of London.

=== Currency ===
Daniel Waterhouse and Isaac attempt to track down Jack Shaftoe for his counterfeiting crimes and tampering with the Pyx. Meanwhile Eliza aids Princess Caroline of the Hanovers as her life is threatened amid the scheming over the successor to Queen Anne. Warring militias gather in London and the Whigs and Tories face off.

=== The System of the World ===
Newton dies of typhus (then known as gaol fever) immediately prior to the Trial of the Pyx, but is brought back to life with the philosopher's stone. Jack eventually confesses to his counterfeiting crimes and is hanged but the watching crowd intervene and he survives, unknown to Newton. Jack is reunited with his love Eliza, and they live out their days in the court of Louis XIV.

== Style ==
The System of the World emulates many different literary styles. As one reviewer put it: it "is a con-fusion ... of historical novel, roman à thèse, epistolary novel, roman à clef, nouveau roman, satirical novel, roman fleuve, et cetera, et cetera, all bound up in the unlikely guise of epic science-fiction page-turner."

== Main characters ==
- Eliza
- Enoch Root
- Bob Shaftoe, brother of Jack Shaftoe
- Jack Shaftoe
- Daniel Waterhouse
- Isaac Newton
- Johann von Hacklheber, Eliza's son

== Other characters ==
- Henry Arlanc, Huguenot, friend of Jack Shaftoe, porter at the Royal Society
- Mrs. Arlanc, wife of Henry
- Roger Comstock, Marquis of Ravenscar, Whig ally of Daniel Waterhouse
- Will Comstock, Earl of Lostwithiel
- Édouard de Gex, Jesuit fanatic
- William Ham, banker, nephew of Daniel Waterhouse
- Otto van Hoek, captain of the Minerva
- Dappa, first mate of the Minerva
- Mr. Kikin, Russian diplomat in London
- Norman Orney, London shipbuilder
- Mr. Threader, Tory money-scrivener
- Charles White, Tory who bites off people's ears
- Peter Hoxton (alias Saturn), Horologist, engages in illicit activities

== Historical figures who appear as characters in the novel ==
- Catherine Barton
- Caroline of Ansbach
- John Churchill, 1st Duke of Marlborough
- George I of Great Britain
- George II of Great Britain
- Robert Harley, 1st Earl of Oxford and Earl Mortimer
- Jack Ketch
- Gottfried Leibniz
- Thomas Newcomen
- Isaac Newton
- Peter the Great
- Sophia of Hanover
- Henry St John, 1st Viscount Bolingbroke
- Christopher Wren

== Editions ==
- ISBN 0-06-052387-5 : Hardcover edition.
- ISBN 0-06-075086-3 : Paperback edition.
