= The Baroque Cycle =

Novel series by Neal Stephenson

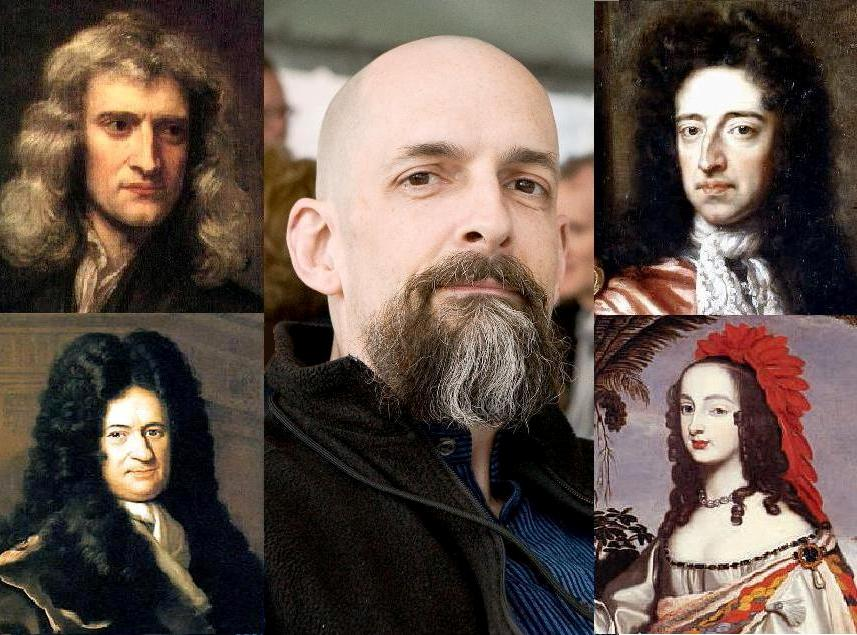
Neal Stephenson (center) makes use of historical figures as characters in The Baroque Cycle, such as (counterclockwise from upper left) Isaac Newton, Leibniz, Sophia of Hanover and William of Orange.

The Baroque Cycle is a series of novels by American writer Neal Stephenson. It was published in three volumes containing eight books in 2003 and 2004. The story follows the adventures of a sizable cast of characters living amidst some of the central events of the late 17th and early 18th centuries in Europe, Africa, Asia, and Central America. Despite featuring a literary treatment consistent with historical fiction, Stephenson has characterized the work as science fiction, because of the presence of some anomalous occurrences and the work's particular emphasis on themes relating to science and technology. The sciences of cryptology and numismatics feature heavily in the series, as they do in some of Stephenson's other works.

== Books ==
The Baroque Cycle consists of several novels "lumped together into three volumes because it is more convenient from a publishing standpoint"; Stephenson felt calling the works a trilogy would be "bogus".

Appearing in print in 2003 and 2004, the cycle contains eight books originally published in three volumes:

- Quicksilver, Vol. I of the Baroque Cycle – Arthur C. Clarke Award winner, Locus Award nominee, 2004
  - Book 1 – Quicksilver
  - Book 2 – King of the Vagabonds
  - Book 3 – Odalisque
- The Confusion, Vol. II of the Baroque Cycle – Locus Award winner
  - Book 4 – Bonanza
  - Book 5 – The Juncto
- The System of the World, Vol. III of the Baroque Cycle – Locus Award winner, Arthur C. Clarke Award nominee, 2005
  - Book 6 – Solomon's Gold
  - Book 7 – Currency
  - Book 8 – The System of the World

== Setting ==
The books travel throughout early modern Europe between the Restoration of the Stuart monarchy and the beginning of the 18th century. Though most of the focus is in Europe, the adventures of one character, Jack Shaftoe, take him throughout the world, and the fledgling British colonies in North America are important to another (Daniel Waterhouse). Quicksilver takes place mainly in the years between the Restoration of the Stuart monarchy in England (1660) and the Glorious Revolution of 1688. The Confusion follows Quicksilver without temporal interruption, but ranges geographically from Europe and the Mediterranean through India to the Philippines, Japan and Mexico. The System of the World takes place principally in London in 1714, about ten years after the events of The Confusion.

== Themes ==
A central theme in the series is Europe's transformation away from feudal rule and control toward the rational, scientific, and more merit-based systems of government, finance, and social development that define what is now considered "western" and "modern".

Characters include Sir Isaac Newton, Gottfried Leibniz, Nicolas Fatio de Duillier, William of Orange, Louis XIV, Oliver Cromwell, Peter the Great, John Churchill, 1st Duke of Marlborough, and many other people of note of that time. The fictional characters of Eliza, Jack and Daniel collectively cause real historic effects.

The books feature considerable sections concerning alchemy. The principal alchemist of the tale is the mysterious Enoch Root, who, along with the descendants of several characters in this series, is also featured in the Stephenson novels Cryptonomicon and Fall.

Mercury provides a unifying theme, both in the form of the common name "quicksilver" for the element Mercury, long associated with alchemy and the title of the first volume of the cycle, and the Roman god Mercury, especially the god's various patronages: financial gain, commerce, eloquence, messages, communication, travelers, boundaries, luck, trickery, and thieves, all of which are central themes in the plot. Astronomy is also a significant (although secondary) theme in the cycle; a transit of Mercury was notably observed in London on the day of the coronation of King Charles II of England, whose Restoration marks, chronologically, the earliest key historical event in the cycle.

== Inspiration ==
Stephenson was inspired to write The Baroque Cycle when, while working on Cryptonomicon, he encountered a statement by George Dyson in Darwin among the Machines that suggests Leibniz was "arguably the founder of symbolic logic and he worked with computing machines". He also had heard considerable discussion of the Leibniz–Newton calculus controversy and Newton's work at the treasury during the last 30 years of his life, and in particular the case against Leibniz as summed up in the Commercium Epistolicum of 1712 was a huge inspiration which went on to inform the project. He found "this information striking when [he] was already working on a book about money and a book about computers". Further research into the period excited Stephenson and he embarked on writing the historical piece that became The Baroque Cycle.

== Characters ==
=== Main characters ===
- Daniel Waterhouse, an English natural philosopher and Dissenter
- Jack Shaftoe, an illiterate adventurer of great resourcefulness and charisma
- Eliza, a girl abducted into slavery, and later freed, who becomes a spy and a financier
- Enoch Root, a mysterious and ageless man who also appears in Cryptonomicon, set in World War II and the 1990s. He also appears in Fall; or, Dodge in Hell.
- Bob Shaftoe, a soldier in the service of John Churchill, and brother of Jack Shaftoe

=== Minor characters ===
- Louis Anglesey, Earl of Upnor, best swordsman in England
- Thomas More Anglesey, Cavalier, Duke of Gunfleet
- Duc d'Arcachon, French admiral who dabbles in slavery
- Etienne d'Arcachon, son of the duke; most polite man in France
- Henri Arlanc, Huguenot, friend of Jack Shaftoe.
- Henry Arlanc, Son of Henri Arlanc, porter of the Royal Society
- Mrs. Arlanc, wife of Henry
- Gomer Bolstrood, dissident agitator, future legendary furniture maker
- Clarke, English alchemist, boards young Isaac Newton
- Charles Comstock, son of John Comstock
- John Comstock, Earl of Epsom and Lord Chancellor
- Roger Comstock, Marquis of Ravenscar, Whig Patron of Daniel Waterhouse
- Will Comstock, Earl of Lostwithiel
- Moseh de la Cruz, galley slave, Spanish Jew
- Dappa, Nigerian linguist aboard Minerva
- Vrej Esphanian, galley slave, Armenian Trader
- Mr. Foot, galley slave, erstwhile bar-owner from Dunkirk
- Édouard de Gex, Jesuit fanatic, court priest at Versailles
- Gabriel Goto, galley slave, Jesuit priest from Japan
- Lothar von Hacklheber, German banker obsessed with alchemy
- Thomas Ham, of Ham Bros Goldsmiths, half-brother-in-law of Daniel Waterhouse
- Otto van Hoek, galley slave, Captain of the Minerva
- Jeronimo, galley slave, a high-born Spaniard with Tourette's syndrome
- Mr. Kikin, Russian diplomat in London
- Nyazi, galley slave, camel-trader of the Upper Nile
- Norman Orney, London shipbuilder and Dissenter
- Danny Shaftoe, son of Jack Shaftoe
- Jimmy Shaftoe, son of Jack Shaftoe
- Mr. Sluys, Dutch merchant and traitor
- Mr. Threader, Tory money-scrivener
- Drake Waterhouse, Puritan father of Daniel Waterhouse
- Faith Waterhouse, wife of Daniel Waterhouse
- Godfrey Waterhouse, son of Daniel Waterhouse
- Mayflower Waterhouse, half-sister of Daniel Waterhouse, wife of Thomas Ham
- Raleigh Waterhouse, half-brother of Daniel Waterhouse
- Sterling Waterhouse, half-brother of Daniel Waterhouse
- Charles White, Tory, Captain of the King's Messengers, who has the habit of biting off people's ears
- Yevgeny the Raskolnik, Russian heretic, whaler and anti-tsarist rebel
- Peter Hoxton (Saturn), horologist
- Colonel Barnes, peg-legged commander of dragoons
- Queen Kottakkal, sovereign of the Malabar pirates
- Teague Partry, distant relative of the Shaftoes in Connaught, Ireland

=== Historical figures who appear as characters ===
- Jean Bart
- Catherine Barton
- Henry St John, 1st Viscount Bolingbroke
- Robert Boyle
- Henrietta Braithwaite, mistress of George II
- Caroline of Ansbach
- Charles II of England
- John Churchill, later 1st Duke of Marlborough
- Sir William Curtius, Baron Curtius of Sweden
- D'Artagnan
- Nicolas Fatio de Duillier
- John Flamsteed
- Benjamin Franklin (as a young boy)
- Eleanor Erdmuthe Louise, widow of John Frederick
- Elizabeth Charlotte of the Palatine
- George I of Great Britain
- George II of Great Britain, the Prince of Wales
- Nell Gwyn
- George Frideric Handel
- Robert Hooke
- Christiaan Huygens
- James Stuart, Duke of York, then James VII and II
- George Jeffreys
- Johann Georg IV, Elector of Saxony
- Arnold Joost van Keppel
- Jack Ketch
- Gottfried Leibniz
- Louis XIV of France
- Mary II of England
- Thomas Newcomen
- Isaac Newton
- Henry Oldenburg
- William Penn
- Samuel Pepys
- Peter the Great traveling incognito as Peter Romanov
- Bonaventure Rossignol, a French cryptanalyst
- James Scott, Duke of Monmouth
- John III Sobieski, King of Poland
- Sophia of Hanover
- Sophia Charlotte of Hanover
- Edward "Blackbeard" Teach
- Elizabeth Villiers
- John Wilkins
- William III of England, Prince of Orange
- Christopher Wren
- John Locke
- John Keill
- Ignatius Sancho's life as a freed slave in 18th century London, letters as an abolitionist, and life under the protection of a Duchess bear a strong similarity to the character of Dappa

== Critical response ==
Robert Wiersem of The Toronto Star called The Baroque Cycle a "sublime, immersive, brain-throttlingly complex marvel of a novel that will keep scholars and critics occupied for the next 100 years".
