= Gymnasium illustre =

Gymnasium illustre may refer to

- A type of advanced secondary school and semi-university originating in 16th-17th century Europe
- Bismarck-Gymnasium Karlsruhe
- Ernestine Gymnasium, Gotha
- Eberhard-Ludwigs-Gymnasium, Stuttgart
