= Curtius baronets =

Extinct baronetcy in the Baronetage of England

Curtius Baronetcy of Sweden
- Creation date: 2 April 1652
- Created by: Charles II
- Baronetage: Baronetage of England
- First holder: Sir William Curtius FRS
- Last holder: Wilhelm Adam von Curti
- Status: Extinct
- Extinction date: 15 January 1823

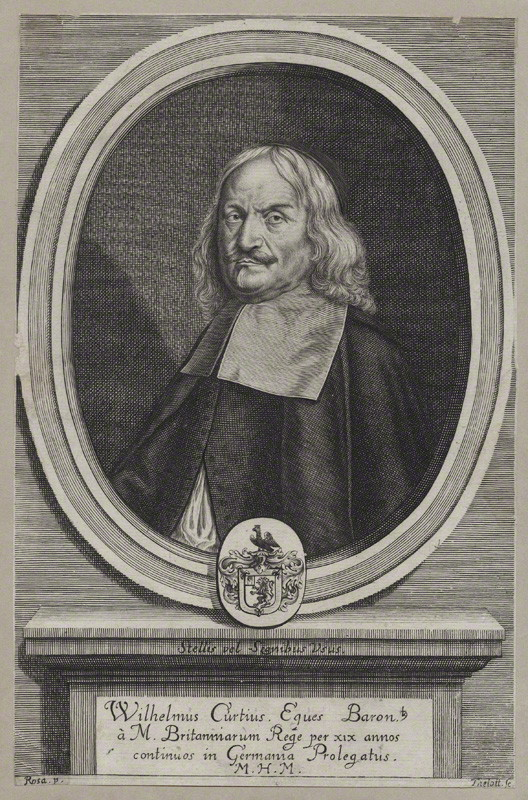
Wilhelmus Curtius, Baronet "Ambassador in Germany for His British Majesty for 19 Years" National Portrait Gallery mw140525

The Curtius Baronetcy of Sweden was a title in the Baronetage of England, created on 2 April 1652 for William Curtius, "Resident to the King of Sweden".

Curtius was a diplomat representing the House of Stuart during the Thirty Years' War and the exile of Charles II, and head magistrate for two of the Electoral Palatinate districts for many years. Curtius was elected as a Fellow of the Royal Society in 1667, and was England's Resident Ambassador to the Holy Roman Empire from 1664 until 1677.

The second baronet was Karl Wilhelm (Charles William); his son Carl August Adolf von Curti was the third.

The baronetcy became extinct in 1823 with the death of the fourth baronet, Wilhelm Adam. The Curti-Schloss was inherited by Julianne von Curti, and then by her children of her marriage into the Von Gall family.

== Curtius Baronets, of Sweden ==
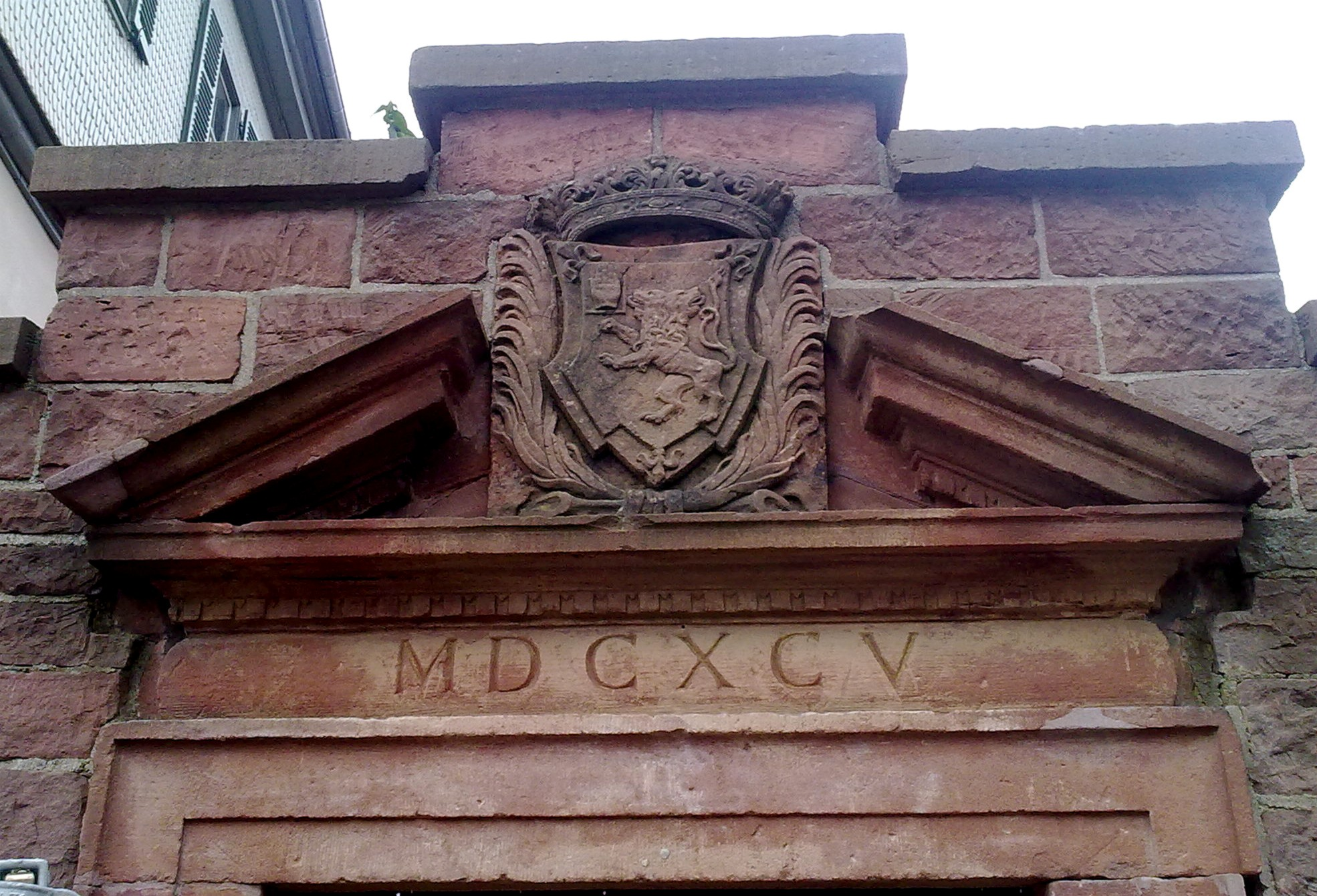
The coat of arms of the Curtius Baronets from the old cemetery of Umstadt, now located beside the Pfälzer Schloss at the centre of the city

- William Curtius FRS, 1st Baronet (Born Johann Wilhelm di Curti on 12 August 1599 in Bensheim, died 23 January 1678 in Frankfurt am Main).
- Charles (William) Curtius, 2nd Baronet (26 December 1654 – 13 April or September 1733)
- Herman Carl (Charles) August Adolf Curtius, 3rd Baronet (22 April 1699, married 15 March 1740, 18. August 1753)
- Wilhelm Adam von Curti, 4th Baronet (21 July 1742 - 15 January 1823).

On his death in 1678, Sir William was succeeded as Baronet by his son, Sir Charles William Curtius (Carl von Curti), who lived until 1733. Sir Carl was also appointed as Oberamtmann of Umstadt, from 1681 to 1691.

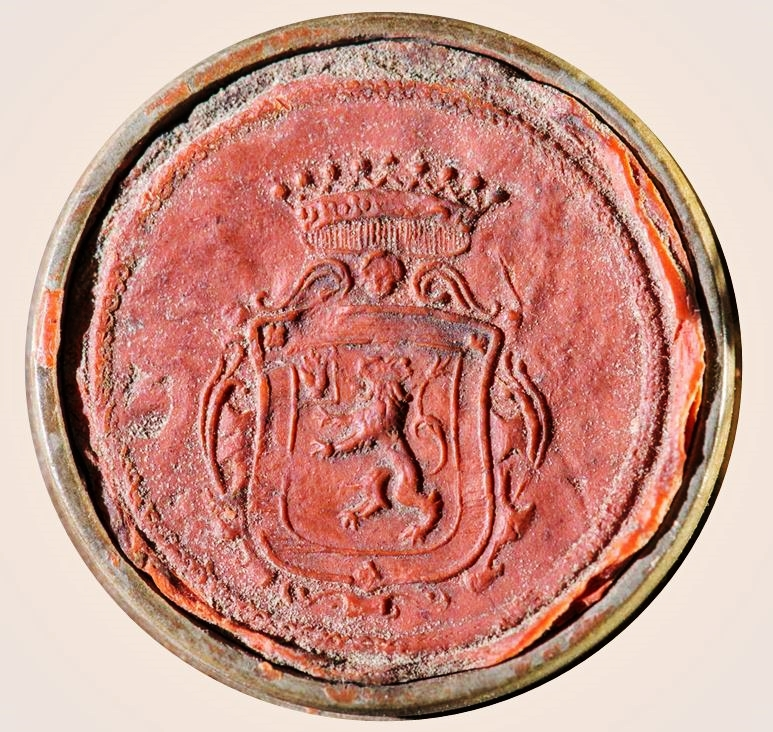
Seal of the Curtius Baronets from 1699; the small hand is from the Arms of Ulster, included as an inescutcheon on the armorial bearings of all English Baronets.

Sir Charles petitioned the English Parliament to pay the substantial fees promised Sir William by "Kings Charles the First, and Second". The petition sought "for a Debt incurred upon the Account of Publick Service by his Father Sir Wm. Curtius, that to the Amount of Fourteen thousand Two hundred Fifty-five Pounds, as appears by the Accompt signed by his late Majesty King Charles the Second; who was pleased to grant him a Privy Seal for Two thousand Pounds; but only Five hundred Pounds, Part thereof, was paid." The petition was unsuccessful.

Since 1785, the church in the village of Wald-Amorbach, Breuberg has rung its bells at 10am daily in the "Curti-Peal" for the salvation of the von Curti family. The peal was established by Carl August Adolf von Curti's widow, Erhardine Catharina Louise von Wahl (* around 1700, † 17. Februar 1786), when she gave the Curti forest to Gross-Umstadt.

Wilhelm Adam von Curti was declared bankrupt in 1790. His estate at that time included feudal leases ("lehen") in six towns: Groß-Karben, Klein-Karben, Kaichen, Kloppenheim, Burggräfenrode and Dortelweil, Kurpfalz.

The baronetcy became extinct in 1823 with the death of Wilhelm Adam, the last male descendant.
