= Cryptonomicon =

1999 novel by Neal Stephenson

- Cover of first edition (hardcover)
- Author: Neal Stephenson
- Language: English
- Genre: Speculative fiction
- Publisher: Avon
- Publication date: 1999
- Publication place: United States
- Media type: Hardcover (first edition)
- Pages: 918 (first edition hardcover)
- OCLC: 40631785
- Dewey Decimal: 813/.54 21
- LC Class: PS3569.T3868 C79 1999

Cryptonomicon is a 1999 novel by American author Neal Stephenson, drawing thematic parallels between wartime secrecy and modern information control, emphasizing the role of information in political, military, and personal domains.

The story is set in two different time periods. One group of characters are World War II–era Allied codebreakers and tactical-deception operatives affiliated with the British Government Code and Cypher School at Bletchley Park, and disillusioned Axis military and intelligence figures. The second narrative is set in the late 1990s, with characters that are (in part) descendants of those of the earlier time period, who employ cryptologic, telecom, and computer technology to build an underground data haven in the fictional Sultanate of Kinakuta. Their goal is to facilitate anonymous Internet banking using electronic money and (later) digital gold currency, with a long-term objective to distribute Holocaust Education and Avoidance Pod (HEAP) media for instructing genocide-target populations on defensive warfare.

== Genre and subject matter ==
Cryptonomicon is closer to the genres of historical fiction and contemporary techno-thriller than to the science fiction of Stephenson's two previous novels, Snow Crash and The Diamond Age. It features fictionalized characterizations of such historical figures as Alan Turing, Albert Einstein, Douglas MacArthur, Winston Churchill, Isoroku Yamamoto, Karl Dönitz, Hermann Göring, and Ronald Reagan, as well as some highly technical and detailed descriptions of modern cryptography and information security, with discussions of prime numbers, modular arithmetic, and Van Eck phreaking.

=== Title ===
According to Stephenson, the title is a play on Necronomicon, the title of a book mentioned in the stories of horror writer H. P. Lovecraft:

I wanted to give it a title a 17th-century book by a scholar would be likely to have. And that's how I came up with Cryptonomicon. I've heard the word Necronomicon bounced around. I haven't actually read the Lovecraft books, but clearly it's formed by analogy to that.

The novel's Cryptonomicon, described as a "cryptographer's bible", is a fictional book summarizing America's knowledge of cryptography and cryptanalysis. Begun by John Wilkins (the Cryptonomicon is mentioned in Quicksilver) and amended over time by William Friedman, Lawrence Waterhouse, and others, the Cryptonomicon is described by Katherine Hayles as "a kind of Kabala created by a Brotherhood of Code that stretches across centuries. To know its contents is to qualify as a Morlock among the Eloi, and the elite among the elite are those gifted enough actually to contribute to it."

== Plot ==
The action takes place in two periods—World War II and the late 1990s, during the Internet boom and the Asian financial crisis.

In 1942, Lawrence Pritchard Waterhouse, a young United States Navy code breaker and mathematical savant, is assigned to the newly formed joint British and American Detachment 2702. This ultra-secret unit's role is to hide the fact that Allied intelligence has cracked the German Enigma code. The detachment stages events, often behind enemy lines, that provide alternative explanations for the Allied intelligence successes. United States Marine sergeant Bobby Shaftoe, a veteran of China and Guadalcanal, serves in unit 2702, carrying out Waterhouse's plans. At the same time, Japanese soldiers, including mining engineer Goto Dengo, a "friendly enemy" of Shaftoe's, are assigned to build a mysterious bunker in the mountains in the Philippines as part of what turns out to be a literal suicide mission.

Circa 1997, Randy Waterhouse (Lawrence's grandson) joins his old role-playing game companion Avi Halaby in a new startup, providing Pinoy-grams (inexpensive, non-real-time video messages) to migrant Filipinos via new fiber-optic cables. The Epiphyte Corporation uses this income stream to fund the creation of a data haven in the nearby fictional Sultanate of Kinakuta. Vietnam veteran Doug Shaftoe, the son of Bobby Shaftoe, and his daughter Amy do the undersea surveying for the cables and engineering work on the haven, which is overseen by Goto Furudenendu, heir-apparent to Goto Engineering. Complications arise as figures from the past reappear seeking gold or revenge.

== Characters ==
=== World War II storyline ===
==== Fictional characters ====
- Sgt. Robert "Bobby" Shaftoe, a gung-ho, haiku-writing United States Marine Raider.
- Lawrence Pritchard Waterhouse, an American cryptographer/mathematician serving as an officer in the United States Navy, although he is known to wear an Army uniform if the situation calls for it.
- Günter Bischoff, a Kapitänleutnant in the Kriegsmarine, who commands a U-boat for much of the story, and later takes command of a new, advanced submarine fueled with hydrogen peroxide.
- Rudolf "Rudy" von Hacklheber, a non-Nazi German mathematician and cryptographer, who spent time attending Princeton University, where he had a romantic relationship with Alan Turing and befriended Waterhouse. He seems to know more about the mysterious Societas Eruditorum than any non-member.
- Earl Comstock, a former Electrical Till Corp. executive and US Army officer, who eventually founds the NSA and becomes a key policy maker for US involvement in the Second Indochina War.
- Julieta Kivistik, a Finnish woman who assists some of the World War II characters when they find themselves stranded in Sweden, and who later gives birth to a baby boy (Günter Enoch Bobby Kivistik) whose paternity is uncertain.
- "Uncle" Otto Kivistik, Julieta's uncle, who runs a successful smuggling ring between neutral Sweden, Finland, and the USSR during World War II.
- Glory Altamira, a nursing student and Bobby Shaftoe's Filipina lover. She becomes a member of the Philippine resistance movement during the Japanese occupation. Mother of Douglas MacArthur Shaftoe.
- Karl Beck, Bischoff's executive officer. He temporarily relieves his captain of command for an alleged mental breakdown (during which time he captures Shaftoe and Root) but later relinquishes command back to Bischoff after their entire crew is deemed expendable by their superiors.

==== Historical figures ====
Fictionalized versions of several historical figures appear in the World War II storyline:

- Alan Turing, the cryptographer and computer scientist, is a colleague and friend of Lawrence Waterhouse and sometime lover of Rudy von Hacklheber.
- Douglas MacArthur, the famed U.S. Army general, who takes a central role toward the end of the World War II timeline.
- Karl Dönitz, Großadmiral of the Kriegsmarine, is never actually seen as a character but issues orders to his U-boats, including the one captained by Bischoff. Bischoff threatens to reveal information about hidden war gold unless Dönitz rescinds an order to sink his submarine.
- Hermann Göring, who appears extensively in the recollections of Rudy von Hacklheber as Rudy recounts how Göring tried recruiting him as a cryptographer for the Nazis: Rudy delivers an intentionally weakened system, reserving the full system for the use of the conspiracy among the characters to locate hidden gold.
- Future United States President Ronald Reagan is depicted during his wartime service as an officer in the U.S. Army Air Corps Public Relations branch's 1st Motion Picture Unit. He attempts to film an interview with the recuperating and morphine-addled Bobby Shaftoe, who spoils the production with his account of a giant lizard attack and his harsh criticism of General MacArthur.
- Admiral Isoroku Yamamoto's 1943 death at the hands of U.S. Army fighter aircraft during Operation Vengeance over Bougainville Island fills an entire chapter. During his fateful flight, the Commander-in-Chief of the Japanese Imperial Navy's Combined Fleet reflects upon the failures and hubris of his Imperial Army counterparts, who persistently underestimate the cunning and ferocity of their Allied opponents in the Pacific Theatre of Operations. As his damaged transport plane completes its terminal descent, Yamamoto realizes that all of the Japanese military codes have been broken, which explains why he is "on fire and hurtling through the jungle at a hundred miles per hour in a chair, closely pursued by tons of flaming junk".
- Albert Einstein brushes off a young Lawrence Waterhouse's request for advice. During his year of undergraduate study at Princeton, Waterhouse periodically wanders the halls of the Institute for Advanced Study, randomly asking mathematicians (whose names he never remembers) for advice on how to make intricate calculations for his "sprocket question", which is how he eventually meets Turing.
- Harvest, an early supercomputer built by IBM (known as "ETC" or "Electrical Till Corp." in the novel) for the National Security Agency for cryptanalysis. The fictionalized Harvest became operational in the early 1950s, under the supervision of Earl Comstock, while the actual system was installed in 1962.

=== 1990s storyline ===
The precise date of this storyline is not established, but the ages of characters, the technologies described, and certain date-specific references suggest that it is set in the late 1990s, at the time of the internet boom and the Asian financial crisis.

- Randall "Randy" Lawrence Waterhouse, eldest grandson of Lawrence and Mary Waterhouse (née cCmndhd) and an expert systems and network administrator with the Epiphyte(2) corporation. He is mentioned in Stephenson's 2019 novel Fall, in which he has amassed a fortune that led to the creation of a charitable Foundation bearing his name.
- Avi "Avid" Halaby, Randy's business partner in Epiphyte(2), of which he is the CEO. He is descended on his mother's side from New Mexican Crypto-Jews, which detail, while seemingly included as a pun, is explored further in The Baroque Cycle. Avi is obsessed with using technology to prevent future genocides, namely by creating a handbook of basic technology and defense practices. His nickname Avid comes from his love of role playing games.
- America "Amy" Shaftoe, Bobby Shaftoe's granddaughter who has moved from the U.S. to the Philippines to live with her father Doug. Amy is a boat captain, and accomplished diver.
- Dr. Hubert Kepler, a.k.a. "The Dentist", predatory billionaire investment fund manager, Randy and Avi's business rival.
- Eberhard Föhr, a member of Epiphyte(2) and an expert in biometrics.
- John Cantrell, a member of Epiphyte(2), a libertarian who is an expert in cryptography and who wrote the fictional cryptography program Ordo.
- Tom Howard, a member of Epiphyte(2), a libertarian and firearms enthusiast who is an expert in large computer installations.
- Beryl Hagen, chief financial officer of Epiphyte(2) and veteran of a dozen startups.
- Charlene, a liberal arts academic and Randy's girlfriend at the beginning of the novel, who later moves to New Haven, Connecticut, to live and work with Dr. G.E.B. (Günter Enoch Bobby) Kivistik.
- Andrew Loeb, a former friend and now Randy's enemy, a survivalist and neo-Luddite whose lawsuits destroyed Randy and Avi's first start-up, and who at the time of the novel works as a lawyer for Hubert Kepler. He is referred to by Randy as "Gollum", comparing him to that character in the novels of J. R. R. Tolkien.

=== Both storylines ===
- Goto Dengo, a lieutenant in the Imperial Japanese Army and a mining engineer involved in an Axis project to bury looted gold in the Philippines. In the present-day storyline, he is a semi-retired chief executive of a large Japanese construction company, Goto Engineering.
- Enoch Root, a mysterious, seemingly ageless former Catholic priest and physician, serving as a coast-watcher with the ANZACs during World War II, later a chaplain in the top-secret British-American "Unit 2702", and an important figure in the equally mysterious Societas Eruditorum. He first appears on a Guadalcanal beach to save a badly injured Bobby Shaftoe. Hints about his longevity emerge when Root is critically injured in Norrsbruk, Sweden, and is wed to Julieta Kivistik on his "death bed" so that she and her unborn child can obtain British citizenship. Root is officially pronounced dead, but is slipped away, rapidly recovering after a mysterious therapeutic agent is obtained from his antique cigar box. He turns up in Manila later in 1944 and goes on to spend part of the 1950s with the National Security Agency and, by the 1990s, has been based mostly in the Philippines as a Catholic lay-worker while "gadding about trying to bring Internet stuff to China". Root also appears in Stephenson's The Baroque Cycle, which is set between 1655 and 1714, and in his 2019 novel Fall; or, Dodge in Hell, including a chapter set in late 21st-century Seattle.
- Mr. Wing, a wartime northern Chinese slave of the Japanese in the Philippines, who went on to become a general in the Chinese army and later a senior official in the State Grid Corporation of China. Described by Enoch Root as a "wily survivor of many purges", Wing is one of only two other survivors (along with Goto Dengo and a Filipino worker named Bong) of the Japanese gold burial project, and he competes with Goto and Epiphyte(2) to recover the buried treasure. Although Root and Wing do not meet during the action of the novel, Randy reflects that "it is hard not to get the idea that Enoch Root and General Wing may have other reasons to be pissed off at each other."
- Douglas (Doug) MacArthur Shaftoe, son of Bobby Shaftoe and Glory Altamira, is introduced near the end of the World War II storyline as a toddler during the Liberation of Manila, when he first meets his father, who tries to explain Shaftoe family heritage, including their enthusiasm for "displaying adaptability". In the modern-day story line, Doug is a retired U.S. Navy SEAL officer and Annapolis graduate, who lives in the Philippines and operates Semper Marine Services, an underwater survey business with his daughter, Amy, conducting treasure hunts as a sideline.
- Dr. Günter Enoch Bobby "G.E.B." Kivistik is introduced in the modern storyline as a smug, Oxford-educated liberal-arts professor from Yale who recruits, and later seduces, Randy Waterhouse's girlfriend, Charlene. In the World War II storyline he is the unborn son of Julieta Kivistik and one of three possible fathers (hence his unusual name) including Günter Bischoff, Enoch Root and Bobby Shaftoe. He is a minor character in Cryptonomicon, but both his [impending] birth and his participation in Charlene's "War as Text" conference catalyze major plot developments.
- Mary cCmndhd Waterhouse, Randy's Australian-born, Qwghlmian grandmother. cCmndhd (pronounced "Skuhmithid" and anglicized as "Smith") is a member of a Qwghlmian immigrant community living in Australia, who catches Laurence Waterhouse's attention while he is stationed in Brisbane.

== Technical content ==
Portions of Cryptonomicon contain large amounts of exposition. Several pages are spent explaining in detail some of the concepts behind cryptography and data storage security, including a description of Van Eck phreaking.

=== Cryptography ===
==== Pontifex Cipher ====
In the book, a playing-card based cipher called Pontifex is used. At Stephenson's request, Bruce Schneier developed such a cipher, calling it Solitaire, and a precise description of Solitaire is included as an appendix. Solitaire was cryptanalyzed in 1999.

==== One-time pad ====
Several of the characters in the book communicate with each other through the use of one-time pads. A one-time pad (OTP) is an encryption technique that requires a single-use pre-shared key of at least the same length as the encrypted message.

The story posits a variation of the OTP technique wherein there is no pre-shared key - the key is instead generated algorithmically.

=== Software ===
==== Finux ====
He also describes computers using a fictional operating system, Finux. The name is a thinly veiled reference to Linux, a kernel originally written by the Finnish native Linus Torvalds. Stephenson changed the name so as not to be creatively constrained by the technical details of Linux-based operating systems.

=== Other technology ===
- Carbon arc lamp
- The Dun improved galvanic element
- Mercury acoustic delay-line computer memory
- Van Eck phreaking

== Allusions and references from other works ==
An excerpt from Cryptonomicon was originally published in the short story collection Disco 2000, edited by Sarah Champion and published in 1998. Stephenson's subsequent work, a trio of novels dubbed The Baroque Cycle, provides part of the deep backstory to the characters and events featured in Cryptonomicon. Set in the late 17th and early 18th centuries, the novels feature ancestors of several characters in Cryptonomicon, as well as events and objects which affect the action of the later-set book. The subtext implies the existence of secret societies or conspiracies, and familial tendencies and groupings found within those darker worlds.

The short story "Jipi and the Paranoid Chip" takes place some time after the events of Cryptonomicon. In the story, the construction of the Crypt has triggered economic growth in Manila and Kinakuta, in which Goto Engineering, and Homa/Homer Goto, a Goto family heir, are involved. The IDTRO ("Black Chamber") is also mentioned.

Stephenson's 2019 novel, Fall; or, Dodge in Hell, a sequel to Reamde (2011), reveals that Fall, Reamde, Cryptonomicon and The Baroque Cycle are all set in the same fictional universe, with references to the Waterhouse, Shaftoe and Hacklheber families, as well as Societas Eruditorum and Epiphyte Corporation. Two "Wise" entities from The Baroque Cycle also appear in Fall, including Enoch Root.

Peter Thiel states in his book Zero to One that Cryptonomicon was required reading during the early days of PayPal.

== Reception ==
According to critic Jay Clayton, the book is written for a technical or geek audience. The book drew praise from both Stephenson's science fiction fan base and literary critics and buyers. In Clayton's book Charles Dickens in Cyberspace: The Afterlife of the Nineteenth Century in Postmodern Culture (2003), he calls Stephenson's book the "ultimate geek novel" and draws attention to the "literary-scientific-engineering-military-industrial-intelligence alliance" that produced discoveries in two eras separated by fifty years, World War II and the Internet age. In July 2012, io9 included the book on its list of "10 Science Fiction Novels You Pretend to Have Read".

Patrick Hudson reviewed the book for The Zone, judging it to be an entertaining and thought-provoking work, Hudson observed that the wartime sections, particularly those featuring Bobby Shaftoe, are characterized by dark humor and vivid portrayal of conflict, while the mathematical and cryptographic material evokes comparisons to the style of Thomas Pynchon, though is presented in a more accessible and tightly plotted form. While praised for its engaging plot, intellectual depth, and clarity in explaining complex concepts, Hudson criticized its weak characterization of female figures and unconvincing romantic elements.

== Awards and nominations ==
| Award | Year | Result |
|---|---|---|
| Hugo Award for Best Novel | 2000 | Nominated |
| Arthur C. Clarke Award | 2000 | Nominated |
| Locus Award for Best Science Fiction Novel | 2000 | Won |
| Mir Fantastiki Award for Best Foreign Sci-Fi Novel | 2005 | Won |
| Prometheus Hall of Fame Award | 2013 | Won |

== Editions ==
- ISBN 0-380-97346-4 : Hardcover (1999)
- ISBN 0-380-78862-4 : Paperback (2000)
- ISBN 1-57453-470-X : Audio Cassette (abridged) (2001)
- ISBN 0-06-051280-6 : Mass Market Paperback (2002)
- E-book editions for Adobe Reader, Amazon Kindle, Barnes and Noble Nook, Kobo eReader, and Microsoft Reader
- Unabridged audio download from iTunes and Audible.com
- Translations into other languages: Czech, Danish, Dutch, French, German, Italian, Japanese, Korean, Polish, Russian, Spanish. The Danish, French, and Spanish translations divide the book into three volumes. The Japanese translation divides the book into four volumes.

== See also ==
- U-413
- U-553
- U-691
- Fort Drum (Manila Bay), the "concrete battleship"
- Cryptocurrencies
- Operation Mincemeat
