= Stephen Bury =

Stephen Bury may refer to:

- Stephen J. Bury (born 1954), art historian at Frick Art Reference Library
- Stephen Bury, a collective pseudonym for co-authors Neal Stephenson (born 1959) and his uncle historian George Jewsbury, used for their books The Cobweb (novel) and Interface (novel)
