= The Big U =

1984 novel by Neal Stephenson

- First edition
- Author: Neal Stephenson
- Language: English
- Genre: Satire
- Publisher: Vintage Books
- Publication date: 1984
- Publication place: United States
- Media type: Print (Hardback & Paperback)
- Pages: 320
- ISBN: 0-380-81603-2
- OCLC: 45162137
- Dewey Decimal: 813/.54 21
- LC Class: PS3569.T3868 B5 2001

The Big U (1984) is a novel by American writer Neal Stephenson. His first published novel, it is a satire of campus life.

== Plot ==
The story chronicles the disillusionment of a number of young intellectuals as they encounter the realities of the higher education establishment parodied in the story. Over time their lives and sanity disintegrate in different ways through a series of escalating events that culminates with a full-scale civil war raging on the campus of American Megaversity.

Told in the first person from the perspective of Bud, a lecturer in Remote Sensing who is new to the university, the book attacks and makes fun of just about every conceivable group at university, though its portraits of the nerds/computer scientists/role players tend to be more detailed than those of other factions.

The events take place at a fictitious big university consisting of a single building (a central complex with eight towers containing student housing), making the university an enclosed universe of its own. Stephenson uses this fact to take what starts as a mostly realistic satire and move it further and further into the realm of improbability, with giant radioactive rats, hordes of bats and a lab-made railgun.

The book was written while Stephenson attended Boston University and the fictional campus is parallel to BU in many ways. The dormitories are similar to Warren Towers, one of the largest dorms in the US. The character of President Septimius Severus Krupp shares traits with then–BU President John Silber, although his name—like those of his predecessors as president of the Big U—is taken from the Roman Emperor Septimius Severus. The neon Big Wheel sign plays a part reminiscent of the Boston Citgo sign just east of the BU campus in Kenmore Square.

== Literary significance and criticism ==
Stephenson has said he is not proud of this book. When Stephenson's Snow Crash was published in 1992, the book that became a best-seller and vaulted him to fame, The Big U was out of print and Stephenson was content to leave it that way. When original editions began selling on eBay for hundreds of dollars, he relented and allowed The Big U to be republished, saying that the only thing worse than people reading the book was paying that much to read it.

== Connections to Stephenson's later work ==
- Julian Jaynes' theory of the bicameral mind used by Stephenson in this novel to explain the behavior of some of the cult-like student groups is an important part of the plot of Snow Crash.
- The idea of institutions of learning also serving as repositories of nuclear waste reappears in Anathem.

== See also ==
- The Origin of Consciousness in the Breakdown of the Bicameral Mind

== Sources ==
- Cheuse, Alan (September 30, 1984). "Murderous Pranks". The New York Times.
