= Frederick George =

Frederick George may refer to:

- J. Frederick George, a pseudonym of author George Jewsbury
- Frederick Charles George, the full name of the footballer Charlie George
- Frederick George Sandy, Canadian politician
