= Immercenary =

1995 video game

- Developer: Five Miles Out (Note: Video production work by Montserrata Productions)
- Publishers: NA: Electronic Arts; JP: Electronic Arts Victor
- Director: J. D. Robinson
- Producers: Jim Simmons; Marla Johnson-Norris
- Designer: Ken Hubbell
- Artists: Christopher Stashuk; Mitch Gates
- Writer: Elton Pruitt
- Platform: 3DO
- Release: NA: March 1995; JP: September 22, 1995
- Genres: First-person shooter, role-playing
- Mode: Single-player

Immercenary (Note: Also known as Perfect World (Japanese: パーフェクトワールド, Hepburn: Pāfekuto Wārudo) in Japan.) is a 1995 role-playing first-person shooter video game developed by Five Miles Out and published by Electronic Arts in North America and Japan exclusively for the 3DO. Set in 2004, players assume the role of PIC (Project for Intertemporal Communication) operative number five tasked with shutting down the operating system Perfect1, which trapped all humanity into the Garden core of the Perfect virtual reality network. Its gameplay mainly consists of first-person shooter action mixed with role-playing game elements. The game was conceived in 1993 by Five Miles Out, whose members were role-playing game enthusiasts, as their first project to showcase the capabilities of the then-upcoming 3DO system and was inspired by Neal Stephenson's science fiction novel Snow Crash.

== Gameplay ==
Gameplay screenshot.

The player begins at the lowest rank in the Garden, number 255. The object of the game is to destroy Perfect1, who is ranked number 1. After eliminating a rithm, the player may then absorb its energy by walking through the cloud of static it leaves behind. Doing so gives a boost to one of three statistics: maximum defense (hit points), maximum offense (ammunition) or maximum agility (fuel). The tougher the opponent defeated, the larger the boost that the player receives. The weakest are the "Goners", who are all ranked number 256. They will yield no increase in rank when destroyed, even at the beginning of the game, but may still provide a statistic boost. Picassos, Torks, Kilroys, Venuses, and Davids are more powerful than Goners, and each individual among them has a unique rank.

Movement is akin to that of a combat flight simulator, though restricted to the ground. Pressing up on the D-pad causes the player character to accelerate, which consumes agility. Once in motion, the player will continue moving forward at the same speed until it accelerates further, runs into an obstacle, or comes to an immediate stop (accomplished by pressing both shoulder buttons simultaneously). Though running into an obstacle prevents the character from advancing, its legs continue to run, and if turned away from the obstacle the character will resume moving at the same speed as before. If the player character runs out of agility, movement is reduced to a slow limping. Agility can be replenished by standing still or visiting the DOAsys, a small neutral zone where the player character can converse with other rithms, including boss characters. Offense and defense can be replenished at the recovery spires found throughout Perfect, or at the DOAsys. Other rithms also use recovery spires, and their resources are finite. However, they are regularly recharged during "storms". Standing on a recovery spire during a storm drains the player rithm's defense.

When a player's rithm is destroyed, it receives a decrease to its stats, and the player character is sent back to the real world. The player character may also voluntarily jack out from Perfect at any of the recovery spires, or at the DOAsys. While in the real world, the player may review the net gains (or losses) to the player character's stats since the last jacking out, view statistics on their performance, save the game, or load a saved game. A game over is only reached if the character's Defense stat reaches 0, or if the character loses the final boss fight.

To confront Perfect1, the player must first defeat the other ten bosses. Unlike other enemies, bosses generally do not wander through Perfect, and can be confronted at their specific lair at any time the player chooses. However, boss lairs disappear during storms, leaving the bosses to wander freely until the storm ends.

== Plot ==
Immercenary is set in 2004. During the 1990s, Dr. Marcus Rand was experimenting in astral projection through time and space, and encountered a woman in the future who was able to sense his astral form. The woman (later identified as simply "Raven") told him that in her time, all of humanity is jacked into a virtual reality network called Perfect, and cannot jack out, leaving them to wither and die as their physical needs are left unattended. Determined to answer Raven's plea for help, Rand focuses his research on projecting a person's mind to Perfect. When two test subjects died using his experimental technology, Rand's project was terminated and the use of the technology forbidden. Undeterred, Rand continued research using himself as the test subject. However, during his experimentation he received a near-fatal "psi feedback"; when found in his lab three days later, conscious but unable to move or communicate, he was committed to a rehabilitation institution.

Eighteen months later, Rand escaped from the institution and formed a terrorist organization dedicated to answering Raven's appeal for help, called the Project for Intertemporal Communication (PIC). During their research, the PIC discovered that everyone in Perfect is engaged in a type of virtual reality MMORPG in which they have no choice but to endlessly battle each other for rank and survival. Those engaged in this MMORPG are known as rithms, and when a rithm is "killed", the human controlling it often goes into a potentially fatal state of shock. The silent protagonist of Immercenary is the latest of five PIC operatives sent into Perfect's core (called the Garden) in a mission to shut down the operating system, Perfect1.

The PIC operative soon finds that he can increase the power of his rithm by crashing and absorbing other rithms, thus giving him a chance of defeating Perfect1. Once he has used this means to increase the rithm's power to many times its original abilities, Raven tells the operative that to have sufficient power to defeat Perfect1, he must crash her algorithm. The protagonist obliges, and goes on to destroy Perfect1. This not only frees all the inhabitants of Perfect, but revives those who were recently put into a state of shock, including Raven. After Dr. Rand congratulates the operative, another PIC scientist tells Rand that he was able to recover the source code for Perfect from the operative's readings, and that they can use this to recreate Perfect without the bugs which caused people to become trapped inside.

== Development and release ==
In 1993, Electronic Arts producer Jim Simmons asked Five Miles Out co-founder J.D. Robinson to create a game which would fully demonstrate the capabilities of the then-upcoming 3DO. As all the members of Five Miles Out were RPG enthusiasts, they decided to make a game in an RPG vein.

Marla Johnson-Norris, who was a veteran of television production and had a small video production company, headed the production of the video segments. She recalled, "We shot video and film sequences of the characters and tested the quality of the imagery in the game environment. We had a film specialist with EA come out and work with us. We ended up going with high quality video instead of film – it actually delivered an equal quality for a lower cost." In another cost-saving measure, some of the roles were played by members of Five Miles Out; for instance, Chameleon was played by co-founder Chris Stashuk. On the filming style used for the cutscenes, Johnson-Norris explained, "We wanted to contrast that dirty, real-world grunge feel – seen in the game 'wake up scenes' with the old barn and slow-moving fans – with the high tech, fantastic virtual world."

The game was developed under the title "Perfect", but Electronics Arts renamed it to Immercenary. The story, written by Elton Pruitt, was heavily inspired by the novel Snow Crash.

== Reception ==
Reception

Review scores
Publication	Score
Computer and Video Games	70/100
Game Informer	8/10
Game Players	81%
GamesMaster	92%
Hyper	86%
Next Generation	3/5
3DO Magazine	3/5
Electronic Entertainment	5/5
Electronic Games	A
Flux	A−
Game Zero Magazine	39/50
Games World	53/100
Ultimate Future Games	74%
VideoGames	9/10

GamePro gave the game a positive review. They praised the strategy involved in building and using the player rithm's stats, the simplicity of the controls, the use of a first-person perspective, and the compelling and well-paced storyline. They concluded, "It's not the longest or most difficult game you'll play. But when a game goes for something new, rather than rehashing old themes, it's worth noticing." Next Generation reviewed the game, rating it three stars out of five, and stated that "you've got a game that's familiar but different at the same time."

Retro Gamer listed Immercenary in their top ten 3DO games, commenting, "RPG overtones imbue with a mesmerising soundtrack and some incredible visual fusions to create one of the rarest experiences in games."
