= Some Remarks =

Book by Neal Stephenson

Some Remarks: Essays and Other Writing
- Author: Neal Stephenson
- Publisher: William Morrow
- Publication date: 2012
- ISBN: 9780062024435

Some Remarks: Essays and Other Writing is a collection of short fiction and nonfiction by the speculative fiction author Neal Stephenson. It is primarily composed of Stephenson's previously published articles, essays, and interviews although it does contain a previously unpublished essay titled "Arsebestos" and an unfinished short story "Under-Constable Proudfoot."

== Contents ==
- "Introduction"
- "Arsebestos" - not previously published (2012)

In "Arsebestos", Stephenson draws connections between characters in Charles Dickens's A Christmas Carol who suffer from a lack of physical mobility and his own chiropractic issues in order to argue for the adoption of more physically active work spaces.

- "Slashdot Interview" - (2004)
- "Metaphysics in the Royal Society 1715-2010" - (2010)
- "It's All Geek to Me" - (2007)
- "Turn On, Tune In, Veg Out" - (2006)
- "Gresham College Lecture" - (2008)
- "Spew" - (1994)
- Selected excerpts from "In the Kingdom of Mao Bell" - (1994)
- "Under-Constable Proudfoot" - not previously published (2012)
- "Mother Earth Mother Board" - (1996)
- Miller, Laura (April 21, 2004). "The Salon Interview: Neal Stephenson". Salon. Archived from the original on February 25, 2012.
- "Blind Secularism" - (1993)
- "Time Magazine Article about Anathem" - (2012)
- "Everything and More Foreword" - (2003)
- "The Great Simoleon Caper" - (1995)
- "Locked In" - (2011)
- "Innovation Starvation" - (2011)
- "Why I Am a Bad Correspondent" - (1998)
