= Mother Earth Mother Board =

Essay by Neal Stephenson

"Mother Earth Mother Board" is an essay by Neal Stephenson that appeared in Wired Magazine in December 1996, on the subject of the history of undersea communication cables and a modern-day effort to lay the Fibre-optic Link Around the Globe. It was later reprinted in Some Remarks.

== See also ==
- How the World Was One
