= Seveneves =

2015 novel by Neal Stephenson

- First edition cover
- Author: Neal Stephenson
- Language: English
- Subject: Space Travel
- Genre: Science fiction
- Publisher: William Morrow
- Publication date: May 19, 2015
- Publication place: United States
- Media type: Print, e-book, audiobook
- Pages: 880
- ISBN: 0062190377

Seveneves is a science fiction novel by Neal Stephenson published in 2015. The story tells of the desperate efforts to preserve Homo sapiens in the wake of apocalyptic events on Earth after the unexplained disintegration of the Moon and the remaking of human society as a space-based civilization after a severe genetic bottleneck.

== Plot ==
=== Part One ===
In the near future, an unknown agent causes the Moon to shatter. As the pieces begin to collide with one another, astronomer and science popularizer "Doc" Dubois Harris calculates that Moon fragments will begin entering Earth's atmosphere, forming a white sky and blanketing the Earth within two years with what he calls a "Hard Rain" of bolides, causing the atmosphere to heat to incandescence and the oceans to boil away, rendering Earth uninhabitable for thousands of years.

The world's leaders evacuate as many people and resources as possible to a swarm of "arklet" habitats called a "Cloud Ark" in orbit with the International Space Station (ISS), bolted onto an iron Arjuna asteroid called Amalthea, which provides some protection against Moon debris.

By the time the Hard Rain begins 701 days after the destruction of the Moon, approximately 1,500 people have been launched into orbit.

=== Part Two ===
Human civilization, as well as nearly all life on Earth, is obliterated. US President Julia Bliss Flaherty manages to get herself up to the Cloud Ark despite provisions that members of government would not be launched into space. Flaherty persuades the majority of the Arklets to abandon the ISS and to move to higher orbit in a decentralized swarm, in the process causing ISS to be struck by a bolide and suffer catastrophic damage that kills 300.

Meanwhile, leader Markus Leuker and robotics engineer Dinah MacQuarie take a small crew to an ice comet fragment that billionaire Sean Probst has brought into Earth's orbit for the purpose of providing propellant for the space station. Probst's crew has died of radiation sickness caused by nuclear fallout from a burst fuel rod in his ship's nuclear reactor. They bring the ice to the Cloud Ark, though MacQuarie is the only survivor of this mission.

Using the ice comet, the remaining third of the Cloud Ark and the ISS (now dubbed Endurance) takes three years to reach the Cleft, a Grand Canyon–sized crevasse on the now-exposed iron core of the Moon. By this time the remnants of Flaherty's swarm have been decimated and have resorted to cannibalism to survive. In the meantime the fallout from Probst's ship (in the form of fuel fragments from his damaged reactor, which heavily contaminated the comet shard), bolide strikes, and prolonged exposure to radiation from the Van Allen belts have also killed most of Endurance's crew. The 11 Swarm survivors, led by a woman named Aïda, negotiate reuniting the Swarm with Endurance. However, fearing ostracism by the crew, Aïda and the remnants of the swarm take advantage of a coronal mass ejection to attempt to take over the Endurance, but fail. This reduces the population even further, and several people die of bolide strikes and from lethal radiation doses as a result of being outside their shelters.

When Endurance reaches the safety of the Cleft there are only eight survivors left after the final casualties of the battle die. All are female, of whom only seven (Dinah, Ivy, Aïda, Tekla, Camila, Moira, and Julia) are still young enough to bear children. Moira can still use her genetics laboratory to rebuild the human race by automictic parthenogenesis. They agree that each of the seven "Eves" gets to choose how her offspring will be genetically modified or enhanced.

=== Part Three ===
Five thousand years later, there are three billion people living in a giant ring of different "habitats" circling the Earth. The population is divided into seven races, each of which descends from and is named after one of the seven Eves and carries distinct racial characteristics that harken back to the personalities and characteristics of the original Eves. Most of the iron core of the Moon has been used to build the habitats, while Cleft itself has been turned into the Cradle, an exclusive piece of real estate attached to a tether that occasionally "docks" with Earth along the equator. This ring is divided into two states, Red and Blue, which are engaged in a cold war. Efforts to terraform Earth for the past several hundred years have proven fruitful; although the process is incomplete, some have resettled the planet in violation of treaty agreements.

"Doc" Hu Noah forms a "Seven" with one member from each race to investigate mysterious people who have been sighted on Earth. They discover that some humans ("Diggers") have survived the Hard Rain on the planet by living in deep mines, and others survived in ocean trenches using submarines ("Pingers"); the latter group descends from a separate, secret underwater ark that had been created concurrently with the Cloud Ark.

== Characters ==
=== Parts One and Two ===
==== The Seven Eves ====
- Dinah MacQuarie: A roboticist working for Arjuna expeditions (a private asteroid mining company). She grew up in mining camps around the world, with her father Rufus and several brothers, and now has her own workshop on the ISS. She is close with Ivy.
- Ivy Xiao: Born in Los Angeles, California, Xiao graduated from the United States Naval Academy before obtaining a PhD in applied physics from Princeton University. At the start of Seveneves, Xiao is the Commander of the International Space Station. She is demoted after allowing Sean Probst to utilize ISS resources but becomes commander again after the death of her successor, Markus Leuker.
- Julia Bliss Flaherty: Frequently referred to as "JBF," Flaherty is President of the United States during the events of Part 1. In violation of an international accord, Flaherty saves herself by fleeing to the ISS aboard a Boeing X-37, along with Pete Starling, her science advisor. Flaherty attempts to reassert her leadership and persuades a large number of Cloud Ark inhabitants to abandon the ISS. Disaster and internal dissent lead to her eventual replacement by Aïda Ferrari.
- Moira Crewe: A geneticist sent aboard to ensure humanity's heterozygosity, Crewe was raised in London and obtained degrees from Cambridge and Harvard, and previously worked on the de-extinction of the woolly mammoth. The loss of the physical Human Genetic Archive makes Crewe's talents extremely valuable.
- Tekla Alekseyevna Ilushina: A Russian cosmonaut, Tekla was a former Olympic heptathlete and was sent in the initial wave of suicide workers called "Scouts" to retrofit the ISS for its role as the cloud ark hub. Rescued by Dinah when her suit life support system malfunctions, Tekla becomes the head of security aboard ISS.
- Camila: A student and activist, who is implied to be from Afghanistan or Pakistan. She had survived an assassination attempt that necessitated extensive reconstructive surgery, and was granted asylum in the Netherlands. Camila was chosen as an arkie as a rebuke to conservative Muslim countries that refused to nominate women in the Casting of Lots. While initially a close friend of Flaherty, Camila grows disillusioned with her during the events of the novel, ultimately preventing Flaherty from murdering Tekla.
- Aïda Ferrari: An Italian arkie, Aïda first appears after having led a revolt against Flaherty's control of the arklets who rebelled against the ISS. Deciding that future humans will look down upon her descendants for the cannibalism that she participated in while the ark cloud was cut off from the ISS, she gives each of her children markedly different qualities to best counter the attributes that are selected by the other Eves.

==== Others ====
- Luisa Soter: A sociologist and the eighth surviving female of Endurance's journey to Cleft, Luisa is post-menopausal and thus incapable of becoming an "Eve." Luisa was born in New York City and educated at the Ethical Culture School, instilling in her a philosophy some of the Eves' descendants would carry forward. Luisa had previously worked with refugees and economic migrants, making her the first psychologist and social worker of the ISS population.
- "Doc" Dubois Jerome Xavier Harris: An astronomer and television personality, "Doob" informs Flaherty of the forthcoming Hard Rain and is eventually sent up to the ISS as a leader and scientific advisor. Doob pushes for the resettlement of the cloud ark on a canyon on "Cleft," a remnant of the moon's iron core that would protect them from radiation and meteorite strikes. He dies of multiple forms of cancer and metastases, probably obtained from radiation exposure, shortly after his arrival on Cleft, but is content in the guaranteed safety to humanity provided by their new home.
- Tavistock Prowse: A blogger and journalist and primary source of information for the arkies in the Cloud Ark, he sides with Flaherty and disseminates her propaganda advocating for secession from ISS. He initiates cannibalism among the arkies by eating his own leg because of their relative uselessness in space. He unintentionally creates a religion among the secessionist arkies, with the swarm being viewed as a supernatural being. He is later eaten by Aïda and her followers shortly before their battle for Endurance to give them energy. The future human races view his siding with Flaherty and his willingness to write her propaganda as caused by his reliance on distractive social media and thus scorn advanced "soft" forms of microcomputing technologies intended for personal use.
- Sean Probst: An aerospace magnate, he plans, builds, and launches the comet-mining spacecraft Ymir to retrieve a shard of the comet 26P/Grigg–Skjellerup after a political battle over the long term viability of the cloud ark. He brings the shard into Earth orbit but succumbs with the rest of his crew to radiation sickness from the fallout of the nuclear reactor that they used to power their spacecraft.
- Cal Blankenship: United States Navy commander of a nuclear ballistic missile submarine. He nukes the Venezuelan Navy and an army of protesters to protect rocket launches to the ISS under orders by the President. He and Ivy amicably end their engagement during the Hard Rain before he submerges to avoid the devastation. He is revealed in the epilogue to have been part of an underwater ark project as extensive as the Cloud Ark, with his descendants recognizing the last photograph that he had sent to Ivy.
- Rufus MacQuarie: Dinah's father and operator of a mine in the Brooks Range, in northern Alaska. He establishes a bunker with his friends, family, and associates to survive the Hard Rain, and his descendants become known as the Diggers. Of all the races, the Diggers remain closest to "root stock" humanity, simply by having enacted population control, instead of using genetic engineering, as the Spacers or selective breeding, as the Pingers.
- Pete Starling: Flaherty's science advisor oversees the development of the Cloud Ark and attempts to seize the resources that Sean Probst is acquiring for his asteroid mission. It is implied that he viewed the Cloud Ark as a palliative for maintaining social order in the face of extinction and not necessarily a viable plan. Unconcerned in the actual success of the project, he is later killed by a micrometeorite within a space capsule that had been launched into orbit in an X-37 at the last minute with the President. His gun is eventually displayed as a relic in a museum by the future human races, allowing visitors to see how different their armaments are from old Earth.
- Ulrika Ek: A Swedish project manager of the construction of Cloud Ark. She refused to provide separate religious worship pods, earning the ire of every religious group, and limited it to an interfaith pod. She dies from a stroke during the journey to cleft.
- Markus Leuker: A former Swiss Air Force pilot and ISS veteran, he is appointed as a politically neutral commander of the cloud ark after Ivy's demotion by the fallout from her refusal to stop Sean Probst. He and Dinah quickly form a relationship. Markus dies during the expedition to continue Sean Probst's mission of bringing Ymir to the ISS.
- Rhys Aitken: A British engineer specializing in unusual constructs, Rhys is initially sent to the ISS to integrate a torus for space tourists. He inspires several upgrades and uses for Dinah's robots, and they have a brief relationship which she breaks off because of his depressive moods following the conclusion of any of his projects. He assists in the creation of Endurance, slips into a depressive mood, and commits suicide a month into the journey.
- Vyacheslav Dubsky: A Russian cosmonaut who is launched to the ISS along with Rhys. He joins the New Caird trip to retrieve Ymir and dies on the trip back to the ISS as a result of radiation exposure.

=== Part Three ===
- Kath Amalthova Two: A surveyor for Blue who takes the name Kath Amalthova Three after undergoing post-traumatic epigenetic shift. She is a descendant of Eve Moira.
- Beled Tomov: A surveyor for Blue with an extensive military background. He is the most physically capable of the Seven that is formed. He is a descendant of Eve Tekla.
- "Doc" Hu Noah: An elderly geneticist leading the expedition to the surface and the prominent head of the New Earth terraforming project. He is a descendant of Eve Ivy.
- Ariane Casablancova: A quarantine agent. Julian and secretly a mole for Red. She ensures the creation of a Red-Digger treaty. She is a descendant of Eve Julia.
- Remembrance "Memmie": Hu's aide/nurse. Remembrance is killed on first contact with the Diggers. She is a descendant of Eve Camila.
- Tyuratam "Ty" Lake: A bartender and manager, Indigen ("Sooner"), and military veteran. He is employed by a secretive society serving the "Purpose" and recruited by Doc for his Seven. He is a descendant of Eve Dinah.
- Langobard: A Neoander and Indigen. He is a descendant of Eve Aïda.
- Einstein: An Indigen. He discovered a buried truck from Old Earth, and his efforts to show it to the Seven lead to their first contact with the Diggers, who highly value the truck's metal. He is a descendant of Eve Ivy.
- Sonar Taxlaw: A Digger encyclopedist, specifically a specialist of the 17th volume of the Encyclopædia Britannica. She joins the Seven to flee her repressive society and explains to them how to contact the Pingers.
- Deep: A Pinger envoy.

== Races and subraces ==
At the end of Part 2, only seven women capable of bearing children remain. Using the genetics lab, each of these women infuse their descendants with modifications that they think will facilitate survival.

- Dinans: Descendants of robotics engineer Dinah MacQuarie, Dinans specialize in leadership and "heroic" qualities.
- Ivyns: Descendants of astronaut Ivy Xiao. Ivyns value intelligence and academic study.
- Aïdans: Descendants of Aïda Ferrari. Anticipating that her descendants would carry stigma from her cannibalism and efforts at political control, Aïda creates many subraces to counter the strengths of the other Eves' genetic lines.
  - Neoanders: Designed to counter the strengths of Teklans, Neoanders possess both the physical prowess and intellectual cunning of several of the other human races. Neoander DNA was sequenced with remnants of Neanderthal DNA from Aïda and the sequence from a Neanderthalian toe.
  - Aretaics : Designed to counter Dinans
  - Betas : Numerous subrace
  - Jinns : Intelligent subrace designed to counter Ivyns
  - Extats : designed to counter Julians
- Teklans: Descendants of cosmonaut Tekla Alekseyevna Ilushina. Teklans have increased discipline and physical capabilities.
- Camites: Descendants of Camila. Camilans carry nonaggressive traits to be better suited to living in the close confines of space for generations, including being non-confrontational and compassionate.
- Moirans: Descendants of Moira Crewe. Moirans are the most versatile and can undergo epigenetic shifts that radically change their bodies and personalities in response to new environments. This is presumably in response to the genetic endowments that Aïda had requested for her own descendants.
- Julians: Descendants of Julia Bliss Flaherty. Julians are more attuned to and adept at social and psychological manipulation. They are the most suspicious of the races and dominate both intelligence and statecraft work.

In addition to these Spacer races, there are two "rootstock" races that do not descend from the Seven Eves.

- Diggers: Descendants from people who survived the Hard Rain in underground shelters, including Dinah's father and his family.
- Pingers: Descendants of those who survived the Hard Rain in underwater caverns aboard submarines. Initially selectively bred for confined spaces, they started selectively breeding to survive underwater after the "spacers" had restored water on Earth via bombardment by comets.

== Development ==
Stephenson first began planning his novel around 2006, while he was working at Blue Origin. He observed: "Some researchers had begun to express concern over the possibility that a collision between two pieces of debris might spawn a large number of fragments, thereby increasing the probability of further collisions and further fragments, producing a chain reaction that might put so much debris into low Earth orbit as to create a barrier to future space exploration. Having been raised on the idea of 'Space, the Final Frontier', I was both appalled and fascinated by the possibility that it might instead become an impenetrable ceiling only a hundred or so miles above our heads." Such a collisional domino effect of satellite destruction is known as the Kessler syndrome.

He would continue to develop Seveneves over the next eight years, as Stephenson tried to "stick to legit science as much as I can".

== Reception ==
As of June 2015, critical reception for Seveneves has been mostly positive. A review in the Chicago Tribune commented on the book's length, stating "when Stephenson finds a theme commensurate with his ambition, all those pages can speed by like a bullet train. Seveneves offers at once his most conventional science-fiction scenario and a superb exploration of his abiding fascination with systems, philosophies and the limits of technology." Booklist also praised the work, writing "Well-paced over three parts covering 5,000 years of humanity's future, Stephenson's monster of a book is likely to dominate your 2015 sf-reading experience."

The Guardian's Steven Poole was more critical in his review, criticizing the work as being overly descriptive, and observing: "Once we arrive in the novel's snail-paced last third, there are lots and lots of lavish descriptions of imaginary machines: city-sized orbiting habitats, giant pendulums reaching down into the Earth's atmosphere, 'sky trains'. After scores of pages of this, my eyelids were succumbing to a powerful gravitational force."

The Initiative for Interstellar Studies published a review in their quarterly online magazine focusing on the book's use of orbital dynamics as one of the main technology themes forming the backdrop of the book.

Molecular biologist Jennifer Doudna praised the book as a "fantastic adventure across time and space, grounded in science but deeply thought-provoking about human nature and the future of our species".

Bill Gates recommended Seveneves as one of five books to read in the summer of 2016, praising in particular its scientific accuracy. He writes, "Seveneves reminded me of all the things I love about science fiction".

== Awards ==
The book was nominated for the 2016 Hugo Award for Best Novel. The book won the Prometheus Award for Best Novel of 2016, awarded by the Libertarian Futurist Society.

== Film adaptation ==
In 2016 Skydance Media and Imagine Entertainment hired screenwriter William Broyles Jr., director Ron Howard, and producer Brian Grazer to adapt the feature film.
