= Polostan =

2024 novel by Neal Stephenson

- Author: Neal Stephenson
- Language: English
- Series: Bomb Light
- Release number: 1
- Genre: Historical fiction; Spy fiction; Thriller
- Set in: Soviet Union, United States, 1933–1934
- Publisher: William Morrow and Company/HarperCollins
- Publication date: October 15, 2024
- Publication place: United States
- Media type: Hardcover (first edition)
- Pages: 312
- ISBN: 9-780-06233-449-7
- Preceded by: none

Polostan is a 2024 spy novel by American author Neal Stephenson, and the first novel in a planned historical fiction series called Bomb Light. The novel received positive reviews from critics like The New York Times, The Washington Post and Kirkus Reviews.

== Plot ==
Set in the early 20th century, Polostan dramatizes the early life of Dawn Rae as she moves between the United States and the Soviet Union amidst the dawn of the Atomic Age. Dawn recounts her time in the States as she is being groomed as a spy for the organization that would eventually become the KGB.

Stephenson references various historical figures and events that occurred in the 1930s, such as General Patton, Lavrentiy Beria and the Century of Progress.
