= Termination Shock (novel) =

2021 novel by Neal Stephenson

- Cover of the hardcover first edition
- Author: Neal Stephenson
- Language: English
- Genre: Science fiction
- Publisher: HarperCollins
- Publication date: November 2021
- Publication place: United States
- Media type: Print (hardback)
- Pages: 720
- ISBN: 9780063028050

Termination Shock is a science fiction novel by American writer Neal Stephenson, published in 2021. The book is set in a near-future when climate change has significantly altered human society and follows the attempts of a solar geoengineering scheme. The novel focuses on the geopolitical and social consequences of the rogue fix for climate change, themes common in the growing climate fiction genre.

== Plot ==
The book is about a solar geoengineering project conceived by a Texas oil-industry billionaire named T.R. Schmidt. Schmidt builds a launcher on the Texas-Mexico border to fire sulfur into the air, a form of stratospheric aerosol injection intended to cool the planet by reflecting sunlight into space. This technique replicates the effects of volcanic eruptions that inject sulfates into the atmosphere and produce global cooling, such as the 1991 Mount Pinatubo eruption. Schmidt's plan has uneven effects, helping low-lying areas such as the Netherlands, Venice, and the Maldives, but threatening the Punjab with drought.

The main characters are Frederika Mathilde Louisa Saskia, the Queen of the Netherlands, and granddaughter of Queen Beatrix; Rufus Grant, a part-Comanche exterminator of feral hogs; and Deep "Laks" Singh, a Punjab-Canadian Sikh. Saskia and Grant become entangled in Schmidt's plan, while Singh travels to the Line of Actual Control on the China-India border, where Chinese and Indian volunteers fight each other using non-lethal martial arts. Singh becomes a world-famous hero after several dramatic and well-promoted victories, but is felled by Chinese directed-energy weapons.

Meanwhile, the Chinese government observes Schmidt's geoengineering efforts, and engages in advanced psychological warfare, cyberwarfare, and deadly tsunami bombs to shift European governments towards a pro-geoengineering stance. This also results in Saskia abdicating her throne for her daughter, after which she joins the growing consortium of smaller pro-geoengineering nations as the "Queen of the Netherworld".

In the climax of the book, Singh is sent with a team of drones on a covert mission by India, whose monsoons were delayed by Schmidt's geoengineering campaign, to destroy the Texas launcher. He is thwarted by Rufus, who takes action largely to protect Saskia, who is hiding in the launcher's subterranean shaft.

The book's title refers to the idea that once a solar geoengineering scheme begins, abruptly stopping it would result in rapid warming, called a termination shock.

== Reception ==
Omar El Akkad, reviewing Termination Shock for The New York Times, wrote that it was "...at once wildly imaginative and grounded...both a response to a deeply broken reality, and an attempt to alter it." Reason magazine noted that the book concerns many small-scale adaptations to climate change, and interpreted it as, "...a novelistic attempt to break down the challenges of climate change and address them clearly and concretely rather than as a mass of unsolvable civilizational mega-challenges." The Chicago Review of Books found it to be a "compelling read" but "only obliquely an example of Stephenson's great gifts for speculative fiction", while Publishers Weekly called it, "fiercely intelligent, weird, darkly witty, and boldly speculative." The Sunday Times reviewed it negatively, saying that, "Stephenson's vision of our climate future doesn't rise above the level of slightly smug, nerdy fun."

Francis Fukuyama compared it favorably to The Ministry for the Future, a 2020 work of climate fiction by Kim Stanley Robinson.
