= Zodiac (novel) =

1988 novel by Neal Stephenson

- First edition
- Author: Neal Stephenson
- Cover artist: Steve Carver
- Language: English
- Genre: Ecothriller
- Published: 1988 (Atlantic Monthly Press)
- Publication place: United States
- Media type: Print (paperback)
- Pages: 283 (first edition, paperback)
- ISBN: 0-87113-181-1 (first edition, paperback)
- OCLC: 17260967
- Dewey Decimal: 813/.54 19
- LC Class: PS3569.T3868 Z39 1988

Zodiac: An Eco-Thriller (1988) is a novel by American writer Neal Stephenson. His second novel, it tells the story of an environmentalist, Sangamon Taylor, uncovering a conspiracy involving industrialist polluters in Boston Harbor. The "Zodiac" of the title refers to the brand of inflatable motor boats the hero uses to get around the city efficiently. His opponents attempt to frame him as an ecoterrorist.

The protagonist is inspired by environmental chemist Marco Kaltofen. Taylor is a recreational user of nitrous oxide, justifying his choice of drug by the eponymous Sangamon's principle: "the simpler the molecule, the better the drug". He justifies the lower toxicity by saying, “Atoms are like people. Get lots of them together, never know what they'll do.”

== Plot ==
In the novel, Taylor is a chemist working for GEE, a fictional environmental activism group which stages both protests and direct actions plugging toxic waste pipes. Taylor becomes involved with Basco Industries, a fictional corporation which produced Agent Orange and is a major supplier of organic chlorine compounds. Basco experiments with genetic engineering to develop chemical producing microbes, driving Taylor's efforts to expose their crimes and preserve Boston Harbor.

A number of the later events of the novel take place on Boston Harbor's Spectacle Island which at the time of publication was almost entirely composed of garbage. In the story it is frequented by drugged-out and reputedly Satanic groupies of the "two-umlaut" heavy metal music band, Pöyzen Böyzen, who are too intoxicated with angel dust to realize they are poisoning themselves with the toxic waste that was dumped there.

Taylor's projects involve sampling the concentration of polychlorinated biphenyls in Boston Harbor with the help of the Gallaghers, a fishing family who record the location of the lobsters they catch. While gathering evidence which GEE will use to expose Basco's crimes, Taylor is flummoxed by the fact that the toxins have suddenly disappeared. He eventually discovers that Basco has acquired a bioengineering firm, where his high school nemesis is employed as a genetic engineer, to create a bacterium that is able to digest toxins, cleaning up the harbor instantly. However, Basco had been forced to release the bacteria into the wild without full testing because of their imminent exposure by GEE. Depending on the equilibrium state of the harbor, the new bacteria are also able to create toxins.

To stop Taylor meddling with their plans, Basco discredits him by planting a bomb in his house and framing him as a terrorist trying to assassinate their president. He escapes with the help of a Native American tribe and eventually returns in secret to steal one of their ships containing a large amount of toxins which they are planning to release into the ocean.

== Release details ==
- 1988, US, Atlantic Monthly Press (ISBN 0-87113-181-1), Pub date ? May 1988, paperback (First edition)
- 1988, UK, Bloomsbury (ISBN 0-7475-0262-5), Pub date ? October 1988, paperback
- 1995, US, Spectra Books (ISBN 0-553-57386-1), Pub date ? June 1995, paperback
- 1997, US, Signet Books (ISBN 0-451-45588-6), Pub date 29 May 1997, paperback
- 1997, UK, Penguin Books (ISBN 0-14-027038-8), Pub date 7 August 1997, paperback
- 2001, UK, Arrow Books (ISBN 0-09-941552-6), Pub date 24 May 2001, paperback
- 2002, France, Denoël (ISBN 2-207-25264-7), Pub date 4 September 2002, paperback
