= Global Neighborhood Watch =

1998 article by Neal Stephenson

"Global Neighborhood Watch" is an article by Neal Stephenson that appeared in Wired Magazine in 1998. In it he proposes a specific plan for using information technology to fight crime. According to Stephenson, he is no longer pursuing the idea.
