= The Cobweb (novel) =

1996 novel by Neal Stephenson and J. Frederick George

- First edition
- Author: Neal Stephenson and J. Frederick George
- Cover artist: Walter Bibikow
- Language: English
- Genre: Science fiction novel
- Publisher: Bantam Spectra (U.S.A.)
- Publication date: 1996
- Media type: Print (Hardcover & Paperback)

The Cobweb is a 1996 novel written by Neal Stephenson with J. Frederick George, a pseudonym for Stephenson's uncle, historian George Jewsbury. It was originally published under the collective pseudonym "Stephen Bury", as was their earlier novel Interface (1994).

== Setting ==
During the first Gulf War, Iraq fired missiles at Israel in an attempt to draw it into the conflict. This strategy was intended to lose the support of Arab/Muslim countries for the US-led military coalition.

In reality, Iraq did not use biological or chemical warheads in these missiles. The story fictionalizes that this was because the story's protagonists foiled an Iraqi scheme to develop a biological toxin.

Much of the novel takes place in the fictional Iowan twin towns of Wapsipinicon-Nishnabotna, named for the Wapsipinicon and Nishnabotna rivers. These towns are based on Ames, Iowa, home of Iowa State University (represented by "Eastern Iowa University" in the story), and also where Stephenson attended Ames High School.

== Plot ==
Betsy Vandeventer, a CIA analyst in Washington D.C., discovers irregularities in federal spending which point towards Eastern Iowa University. There, her academic brother Kevin has been corralled into working for corporate interests, including unknowingly assisting Iraqi intelligence agents to be admitted to the U.S. under the guise of Jordanian research students.

Clyde Banks, a Deputy Sheriff of Wapsipinicon-Nishnabotna, is assigned mostly night shifts after announcing he will run against his boss for the position of Sheriff. With his military nurse wife having been dispatched to the Gulf to prepare for war, he has time to contemplate connections between some odd events - including the death of a Middle-Eastern student, a horse with botulism, and the sudden change in fortunes of his real estate broker.

Vandeventer is stymied by Millikan, an American diplomat who has been misled by (a fictional version of) Tariq Aziz that Saddam Hussein will not invade Kuwait. She is then unwittingly co-opted by CIA agent Hennessy, who has a rivalry with Millikan and has formed a group to weed out moles but needs to act domestically, i.e. out of the agency's remit, to do so.

Kevin Vandevanter correctly predicts he will be murdered and had asked Banks, who has been contacted by Hennessy's group as "eyes on the ground", to look more closely into the circumstances. This eventually leads Banks to conclude that the Iraqi agents have been synthesizing and testing botulinum toxin at the university, and storing it in a warehouse they have purchased near the airport (along with a large number of decoy warehouses purchased around the town). However, by this time the toxin has been covertly loaded onto a cargo plane which will be hijacked by the agents for transport to Iraq.

In the course of his police duties and investigation, Banks had befriended a Wakhi (called "Vakhan Turks" in the text) whose network has a mole in the CIA and has also been monitoring the phony students. Together, they sneak on board to try and prevent the plane reaching the Iraqi military. As Banks had the foresight to, with the help of an emeritus professor, immunize himself against botulinum, the Iraqis fail to kill him with the toxin and Banks convinces the pilots to land in Canada.

== Development ==
=== Publication history ===
The Cobweb was published by Bantam Books on September 1, 1996.

== Reception ==
The book received positive reception from critics. Kirkus Reviews complimented the book's plot and humor, while Publishers Weekly described the novel's depiction of Washington, D.C. as "realistic." SF Site positively compared the book to the works of Tom Clancy and Robert J. Sawyer but also described it as being a step below Bury's previous book, Interface.
