= The Great Simoleon Caper =

1995 short story by Neal Stephenson

"The Great Simoleon Caper" is a short story by Neal Stephenson that appeared in TIME on March 1, 1995. It deals with concepts familiar to Stephenson's readers: encryption, digital currency, and distributed republics. It appears to be set in a United States that precedes the events in Stephenson's novel Snow Crash (1992), using an early version of his Metaverse.

== Plot summary ==
In the story, the protagonist is an underemployed mathematician who resides in the house of his brother's family in Chicago. The brother, owner of an advertising agency, has won a large contract to create ads for "Simoleons", a form of non-governmental electronic "currency". To launch the product, they plan to give away 27 million Simoleons to the winners of a contest. The contest is based on the long-used format of "guess the number of jelly beans in the container", with Chicago's Soldier Field and 26 other football stadiums as the containers.

The brother asks the mathematician ("the hero") to do the calculations needed. The hero complies with the request, using the calculator function of the family's advanced set-top box to speed the long math. Sometime later, while taking a rest break from his online job in the Metaverse, the hero is contacted by a representative of a group of "crypto-anarchists" who have formed a virtual nation called the First Distributed Republic. The FDR warns the hero that the government, which fears E-money, has stolen his calculations by compelling the cable company to tap the family's set-top box. The government plans to give the answers to a group of planted people, who will then proceed to ruin the reputation of Simoleons through various disinformation schemes.

The hero has no actual worry about this, except that his parents are heavily invested in his brother's advertising agency; as the agency would be liable for the loss of security on a project they have contracted for, the agency would go bankrupt, and their parents would lose their money. The FDR, on the other hand, wish to prove that not only would E-money work, but that it can circumvent government controls such as taxes. Together, the hero and the FDR create a simple scheme to foil the plot.

== See also ==
- Bitcoin
