= Anathem =

2008 science fiction novel by Neal Stephenson

- Cover of the hardcover first edition, featuring an analemma behind the author's name
- Author: Neal Stephenson
- Language: English
- Genre: Science fiction
- Publisher: William Morrow and Company
- Publication date: September 9, 2008
- Publication place: United States
- Media type: Print (hardback)
- Pages: 937
- Awards: Locus Award for Best Science Fiction Novel (2009)
- ISBN: 978-0-06-147409-5 (first edition, hardback); 0-06-147410-X (mass market paperback)
- OCLC: 191930336
- Dewey Decimal: 813/.54 22
- LC Class: PS3569.T3868 A53 2008

Anathem is a science fiction novel by American writer Neal Stephenson, published in 2008. Major themes include the many-worlds interpretation of quantum mechanics and the philosophical debate between Platonic realism and nominalism.

== Plot summary ==
Anathem is set on the fictional planet of Arbre. Thousands of years before the events in the novel, the planet's intellectuals entered concents (monastic communities) to protect their activities from the collapse of society. The avout (intellectuals separated from Sæcular society) are banned from possessing or operating most advanced technology and are supervised by the Inquisition, which answers to the outside world. The avout are normally allowed to communicate with people outside the walls of the concent only once every year, decade, century, or millennium, depending on the particular vows they have taken.

The narrator and protagonist, Fraa Erasmas, is an avout at the Concent of Saunt Edhar. His teacher, Fraa Orolo, discovers that an alien spacecraft is orbiting Arbre – a fact that the world government (Sæcular Power) attempts to cover up. Erasmas becomes aware of Orolo's discovery after Orolo is banished (in a rite called Anathem) from the concent for using a video camera (a forbidden technology) to observe the ship. The presence of the alien ship soon becomes an open secret among many of the avout at Saunt Edhar. The alien ship eventually declares its presence by shining a laser upon several Millenarian Maths (the bastions of those avout who have taken a thousand-year vow of isolation). Shortly after that, the Sæcular Power summons many avout from Saunt Edhar, including Erasmas and a Millenarian named Fraa Jad.

The avout are told to travel to the concent of Saunt Tredegarh to attend a Convox (a joint conference of the avout and the Sæcular Power). However, Erasmas and several non-avout companions, with Fraa Jad's tacit agreement, decide to seek out Orolo. After a dangerous journey over the planet's frozen pole, they reunite with Orolo at an archaeological excavation of Orithena, an ancient concent destroyed by volcanic eruption. Orolo holds philosophical discussions with Erasmas about the nature of the cosmos and consciousness, and how he believes that the aliens are not simply from another planet, but from another cosmos that is influenced by Arbre. During one of the discussions, a small spacecraft lands in Orithena on an ancient analemma symbol within the excavation. (It is later revealed that Orolo had transmitted the analemma symbol to the spaceship and anticipated the landing at Orithena.) A female alien's body is found on board, dead of a recent gunshot wound. She has brought with her four vials of blood – one for each of four alien races – and evidence about their technology. Shortly thereafter, the aliens propel a massive metal rod at the volcano, triggering an eruption that destroys Orithena. Orolo sacrifices his life to ensure the recovery of the dead alien's remains and her blood samples, an event that leads to his canonization as Saunt Orolo.

Erasmas travels to Saunt Tredegarh where he attends the Convox dedicated to dealing with the military, political, and technical issues raised by the existence of the alien ship in Arbre's orbit. Research is conducted on the samples from Orithena, and the aliens are found to come from planets in four parallel and distinct cosmi: Urnud, Tro, Laterre and Fthos. The many-worlds interpretation is discussed by high-level avout at evening meals to which Erasmas performs the duties of a servant. It is hinted that Laterre is a futuristic Earth, which serves as a 'higher plane of existence' for Urnud and Tro, and Arbre is itself a 'higher plane' for Laterre and Fthos. Through observation and experiment, Erasmas and his companions determine that the conference has been infiltrated by the aliens and unmask a French-speaking Laterran linguist named Jules Verne Durand. He explains that the aliens are experiencing internal conflict between two factions. The currently ruling faction (the more militaristic 'lower worlds' Urnud and Tro, as well as some Laterrans) intends to attack and raid Arbre for its resources in order to repair their spaceship, while the opposing faction ('the higher world' Fthos and most Laterrans) favors open negotiation. Durand believes that an alliance could be formed between Arbre and the peaceful faction and offers to help the Arbrans.

Fearing alien attack after Durand has been exposed, the avout simultaneously evacuate all concents including Saunt Tredegarh. Erasmas and his comrades are taken to a distant sanctuary where they undergo astronaut training for a mission to board the alien ship, disable its weaponry and negotiate with the aliens. Prior to launch and without their knowledge, the Sæcular Power implants each of them with miniaturized neutron bombs that will be used to kill everyone aboard the alien ship if the mission fails. Three people, including Fraa Jad, are issued detonators. The team is launched into space on modified ballistic missiles and approaches the alien ship by stealth. Four of the avout destroy the ship's main weapon before dying in combat. The rest of the team boards the ship and temporarily pass out from breathing alien air.

The narrative now parallelizes across multiple timelines. In one narrative, Fraa Jad awakens Erasmas and leads him through the ship toward the command center. Upon being discovered and attacked by alien soldiers, Fraa Jad detonates the neutron bombs. In another narrative, soldiers take Erasmas and Fraa Jad captive and bring them to parley with the leader of the peaceful faction. In the final narrative, Erasmas awakens in a hospital on the starship and learns that diplomatic negotiations are underway thanks to the successful destruction of the alien weapon. Erasmas is told that Fraa Jad died in an accident during the launch, contradicting the other narratives. It remains ambiguous which (or how many) of these contradictory narratives are real, or how the narratives have influenced each other. It is implied that some Millenarian avout are capable of operating simultaneously in multiple parallel timelines, and that the Millenarians had called the alien ship to Arbre to disrupt the subjugation of the Avout by the Sæcular Power.

Erasmas attends a diplomatic summit where a funeral ceremony is held for those lost on both sides and a peace process begins between the aliens and the Arbrans. On Arbre itself, the Sæcular Power and the avout have agreed to cooperate as equal powers. The Arbrans inaugurate a second "Reconstitution", revising many of the rules that had restricted the work and lifestyle of the avout. Erasmas and his friends begin to build a new concent, open to the outside world and dedicated to Saunt Orolo.

== The "Discipline" ==
In the novel, avout follow a life path called the Discipline, sometimes referred to as Cartasian Discipline, after Saunt Cartas, the founder of the mathic world. It is a set of rules governing what is (and is not) allowed for avout to know and/or do, and was codified centuries before the time of the story in the Second New Revised Book of Discipline.

Chief among these is that the avout are separated from the Sæculum, or outside world. There are different levels of separation. For example, within a concent, there are different terms of residency. There are 1-, 10-, 100-, and 1,000-year orders. Each of these celebrates "Apert", a festival opening the concent to the outside world and allowing the flow of information between them, on an interval determined by that number. For example, a 10-year order would celebrate Apert once every ten years, remaining isolated otherwise. Likewise, a 100-year order would only celebrate Apert every hundred years, and a 1,000-year order once every 1,000 years. It is an essential part of this that at any time an order celebrates Apert, all orders below it also celebrate Apert. For example, a Millenarian (1,000-year) order would celebrate in the year 3000. Because 3000 is also a multiple of 100, 10, and 1, Centenarian, Decenarian, and Unarian orders would also celebrate. Exceptions to this rule include "hierarchs" (those who administer the concent) who are required to confer with the Sæcular Power on decisions of weight.

The main secondary aspect of the Discipline is that the avout are allowed to own only their "bolt, chord, and sphere". These objects are made with "newmatter" (matter made with a modified atomic structure to be more versatile), and can be made to alter their shape, texture and other physical properties without the use of tools or other outside technologies. The bolt is a length of newmatter fabric and is used as clothing; the chord is a newmatter rope used to secure the bolt; and the sphere is a newmatter balloon of adjustable size, shape and hardness, and serves as a multipurpose tool.

There are several restrictions governing, for example, the use of "sequencing" (genetic engineering), "syntactic devices" (computers), or other "praxis" (technology). Due to the restrictions, avout can only work on an entirely theoretical basis de jure.

== Philosophical and scientific content and influences ==
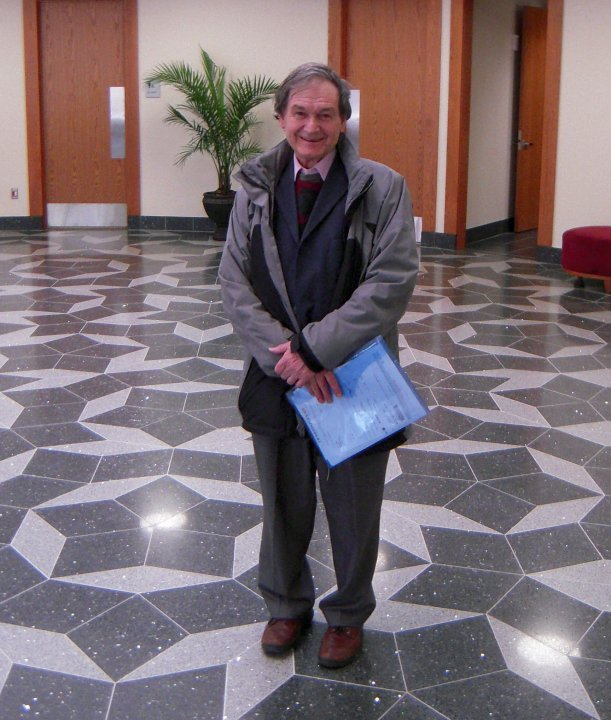
Roger Penrose inspired the novel's "Teglon tiles", based on the aperiodic Penrose tiles, and the discussion of the brain as a quantum computer, based on Penrose's The Emperor's New Mind.

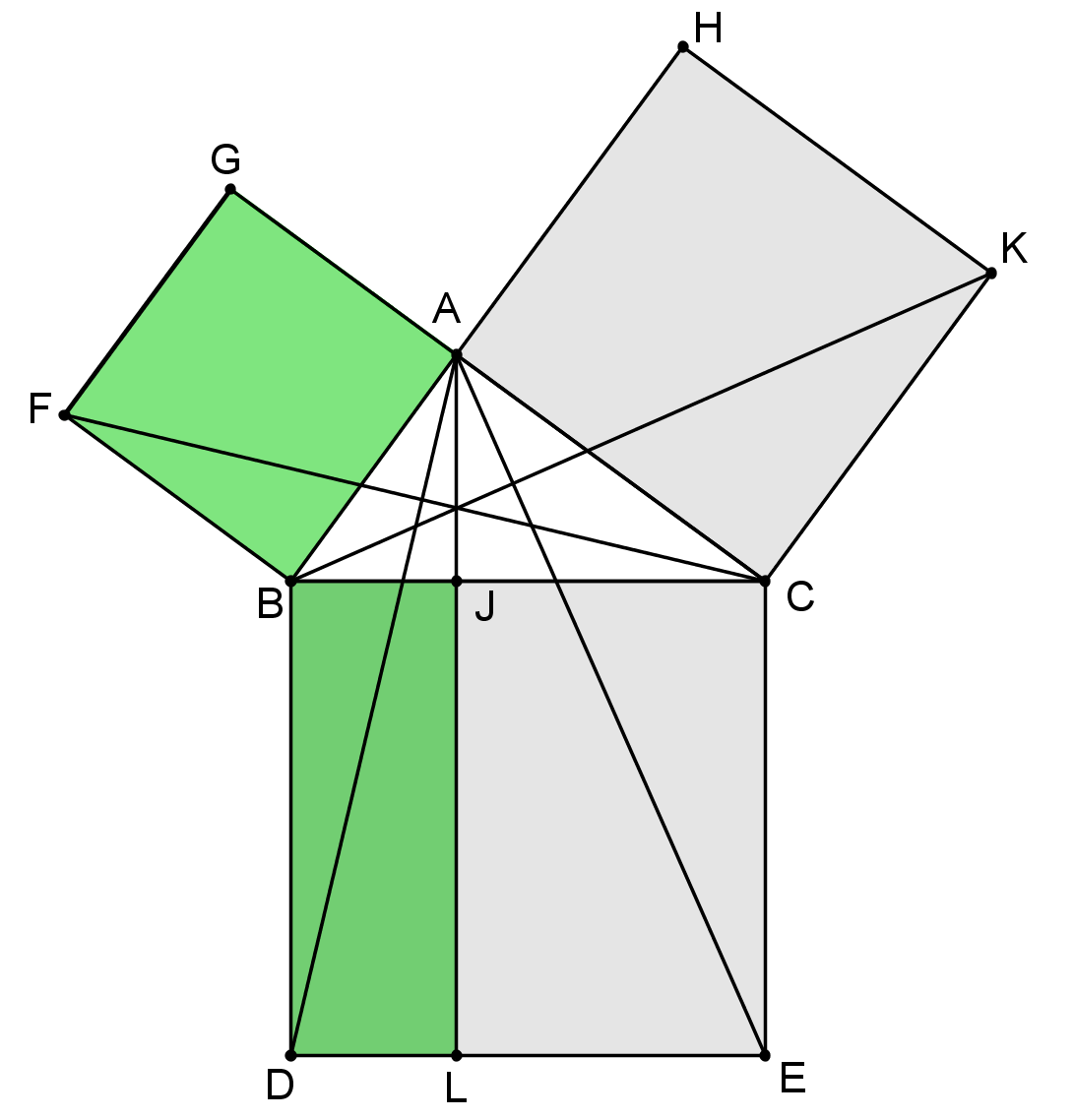
A geometric proof of the Pythagorean theorem is written on the side of the alien ship

Large portions of the book involve detailed discussions of mathematics, physics, and philosophy. Most of these discussions use fictional Arbran terminology, but treat ideas from actual science and philosophy. Stephenson acknowledges the work of author Julian Barbour as the source for much of this material.

A major theme of the novel is the many-worlds interpretation of quantum mechanics based on a directed acyclic graph, which accounts for the various "worldtracks" and "narratives" explored by Fraa Orolo and manipulated by Fraa Jad. Another major theme is the recurring philosophical debate between characters espousing mathematical Platonic realism (called "Halikaarnians" in the novel and associated with Incanters) and characters espousing nominalism (called "Procians" in the novel and who are the Rhetors).

Stephenson cites the work of Roger Penrose as a major influence on the novel. Specific ideas from Penrose's work include: the idea that the human mind operates in certain fundamental ways as a quantum computer, espoused in Penrose's The Emperor's New Mind; Platonic realism as a philosophical basis for works of fiction, as in stories from Penrose's The Road to Reality; and the theory of aperiodic tilings, which appear in the Teglon puzzle in the novel. Stephenson also cites as an influence the works of Kurt Gödel and Edmund Husserl, both of whom the character Durand mentions by name in the novel.

Much of the Geometers' technology seen in the novel reflects existing scientific concepts. The alien ship moves by means of nuclear pulse propulsion.

As an appendix to the novel, Stephenson includes three "Calca", discussions among the avout of purely philosophical or mathematical content. The first is a discussion of a cake-cutting procedure corresponding to the geometric problem of "doubling the square" presented in Plato's Meno. The second presents configuration spaces (called "Hemn spaces" in the novel) as a way of representing three-dimensional motion. The third discusses a "complex" Platonic realism, in which several realms of Platonic ideal forms (called the "Hylaean Theoric Worlds" in the novel) exist independently of the physical world (called the "Arbran Causal Domain" in the novel). The mathematical structure of a directed acyclic graph is used to describe the way in which the various realms can influence one other, and even the physical world can function as part of the realm of ideal forms for some worlds "downstream" in the graph.

== Characters ==
- Erasmas (nickname "Raz"): The protagonist of Anathem; a Decenarian fraa from the Concent of Saunt Edhar. The neglected son of a lower-class family, he was collected by the concent at the age of eight.
- Orolo: A Decenarian fraa from the Concent of Saunt Edhar. He is an eminent cosmographer and Erasmas's mentor at the concent. He is banished for using forbidden technology to observe the alien ship in violation of the Discipline's isolation requirements. He dies while recovering the alien body from Orithena, and is canonized as a Saunt for his sacrifice.
- Arsibalt: A Decenarian fraa from the Concent of Saunt Edhar and one of Erasmas's friends. The estranged son of a religious official, he seeks to reconcile religion with theorics.
- Lio: A Decenarian fraa from the Concent of Saunt Edhar and one of Erasmas's friends. He's known as an absent-minded eccentric and is interested in military history, Vale-lore (martial arts), and unusual gardening techniques. He leads the space mission to destroy the alien weapon.
- Jesry: A Decenarian fraa from the Concent of Saunt Edhar and one of Erasmas's friends. Unlike Erasmas, Jesry comes from a prosperous family, and is bored with the routine of mathic life preceding the arrival of the aliens. He becomes famous for going into space with the Warden of Heaven (a religious leader of the Sæcular Power) to investigate the alien ship.
- Ala: A Decenarian suur from the Concent of Saunt Edhar. She becomes a major organizer of the Convox, and later, the Arbran resistance. Although they disliked each other as children, she and Erasmas become romantically involved in the course of the story.
- Jad: A Millenarian fraa from the Concent of Saunt Edhar. Jad is summoned to the Convox at the same time of Erasmas, but tells Erasmas to look for Orolo instead of traveling directly to the Convox. Jad is a participant in philosophical discussions at the Convox and plays a key role in the mission to the alien ship. It is hinted that he is hundreds of years old and possesses the ability to be conscious within multiple parallel universes.
- Cord: Erasmas' half-sister and a machinesmith who lives near the Concent of Saunt Edhar. She accompanies Erasmas on his search for Orolo. She and Yul become romantically involved in the course of the story.
- Sammann: A member of a social caste of computer experts from the Concent of Saunt Edhar who accompanies Erasmas on his search for Orolo. He provides technological support and knowledge for Erasmas' companions throughout the story.
- Yulassetar Crade (nickname "Yul"): A wilderness guide who joins the expedition to find Orolo. He and Cord become romantically involved in the course of the story.
- Ganelial Crade (nickname "Gnel"): A religious man who volunteers to drive the avout to the Convox, before joining the search for Orolo. Erasmas mistrusts Gnel at first, but becomes friends over the course of the story.
- Jules Verne Durand: A linguist from Laterre who infiltrates the Convox to gather information for the aliens. He defects to the Arbrans and joins the mission to the alien ship.

== Production ==
The novel was partly inspired by Stephenson's involvement with the Clock of the Long Now project, to which he contributed three pages of sketches and notes. A separate compact disc, entitled IOLET: Music from the World of Anathem, containing eight experimental vocal compositions by David Stutz, was sold separately through CD Baby and the Long Now Foundation, with profits going to The Clock of the Long Now project.

To create the world of Arbre, Stephenson constructs new vocabulary. In order to familiarize the reader with the new words, many of which are analogous to English, Latin or Greek words and ideas, a glossary is included at the end of the book. Each chapter begins with a definition of one of these words, which usually relates to the chapter in some way. In addition, the Orth language spoken by the characters was created by Jeremy Bornstein at the author's request, and has been documented. The word anathem was invented by Stephenson, based on the word anthem and the Greek word anathema. In the book, an anathem is a mathic ritual by which one is expelled from the mathic world.

== Reception ==
Anathem received several positive reviews. Paul Boutin wrote in The Wall Street Journal that "the lasting satisfaction of Anathem derives … from Mr. Stephenson's wry contempt for today's just-Google-it mindset. His prose is dense, but his worldview contagious." On Salon.com, Andrew Leonard described the book as "a page turner and a philosophical argument, an adventure novel and an extended existential meditation, a physics lesson, sermon and ripping good yarn."

Michael Dirda of The Washington Post disagreed, remarking that "Anathem will certainly be admired for its intelligence, ambition, control and ingenuity", but describing it as "fundamentally unoriginal", "grandiose, overwrought and pretty damn dull." David Itzkoff of The New York Times concluded that "Anathem spends so much time engaged in copying, in conjuring up alternative formulations of our real-world science and religion, that it forgets to come up with much that is new or true."

The novel entered The New York Times Best Seller list for Hardcover Fiction at number one and achieved the rare distinction for a novel of being reviewed in the scientific journal Nature.

Anathem won the Locus Award for Best Science Fiction Novel in 2009 and collected nominations for the Hugo, Arthur C. Clarke, and John W. Campbell Memorial Awards the same year. In 2008, the novel received a nomination for the British Science Fiction Award.
