= Interface (novel) =

1994 novel by Neal Stephenson and J. Frederick George

- First edition cover credited to Stephen Bury
- Author: Neal Stephenson and George Jewsbury
- Cover artist: Bruce Jensen
- Language: English
- Genre: Science fiction
- Publisher: Bantam
- Publication date: 1 April 1994
- Publication place: United States
- Media type: Print (Paperback)
- ISBN: 0-553-37230-0 (first edition, paperback)
- OCLC: 28148075
- Dewey Decimal: 813/.54 20
- LC Class: PS3552.U788 I58 1994

Interface is a 1994 novel by Neal Stephenson and J. Frederick George (a pseudonym of George Jewsbury) and originally published under the joint pseudonym Stephen Bury. Reprints of the novel have credited the work to Stephenson and George. It is a thriller, set in the then-future year of 1996 when a shadowy coalition bent on controlling the world economy attempts to manipulate a candidate for president of the United States through the use of a computer biochip brain implant. It was described by writer Cory Doctorow in 2007 as an "underappreciated masterpiece".

== Story ==
Illinois governor William Cozzano suffers a stroke. An underground business coalition called the Network arranges for Cozzano to have a biochip implanted and for him to run for President of the United States. The Network is made up of a number of large fictional companies, with parallels in real business entities. The chip is connected to public opinion polls, allowing them to change what Cozzano says or does based on what the public wants.

Eleanor Richmond, an unemployed African-American living in a trailer park, discovers that her husband has committed suicide in their repossessed former home. After verbally humiliating a local racist cable TV public-access television talk show personality who was running for Senate, Richmond begins working in the offices of a Republican Colorado senator. After an event where she accused the citizens of Colorado of being welfare queens, she finds herself in the public eye as a candidate for Cozzano's running mate.

The Network's ability to perceive public opinion, skewed on the night of the vice presidential debate by a twist of fate, makes them select Richmond as vice presidential candidate. Their canny act of public relations work enables Cozzano to save his Presidential campaign. President-elect Cozzano is shot at his inauguration by a psychotic former factory worker who has learned of almost the entirety of the Network's plans. He dies almost instantly. Richmond becomes the first black and the first female President of the United States.

== Characters ==
- Eleanor Richmond, unemployed, protagonist
- William Cozzano, governor of Illinois
- Mary Catherine Cozzano, his daughter and a neurologist
- Cy Ogle, campaign manager
- Dr. Radhakrishnan, neurosurgeon
