= George Jewsbury =

American historian (born 1941)

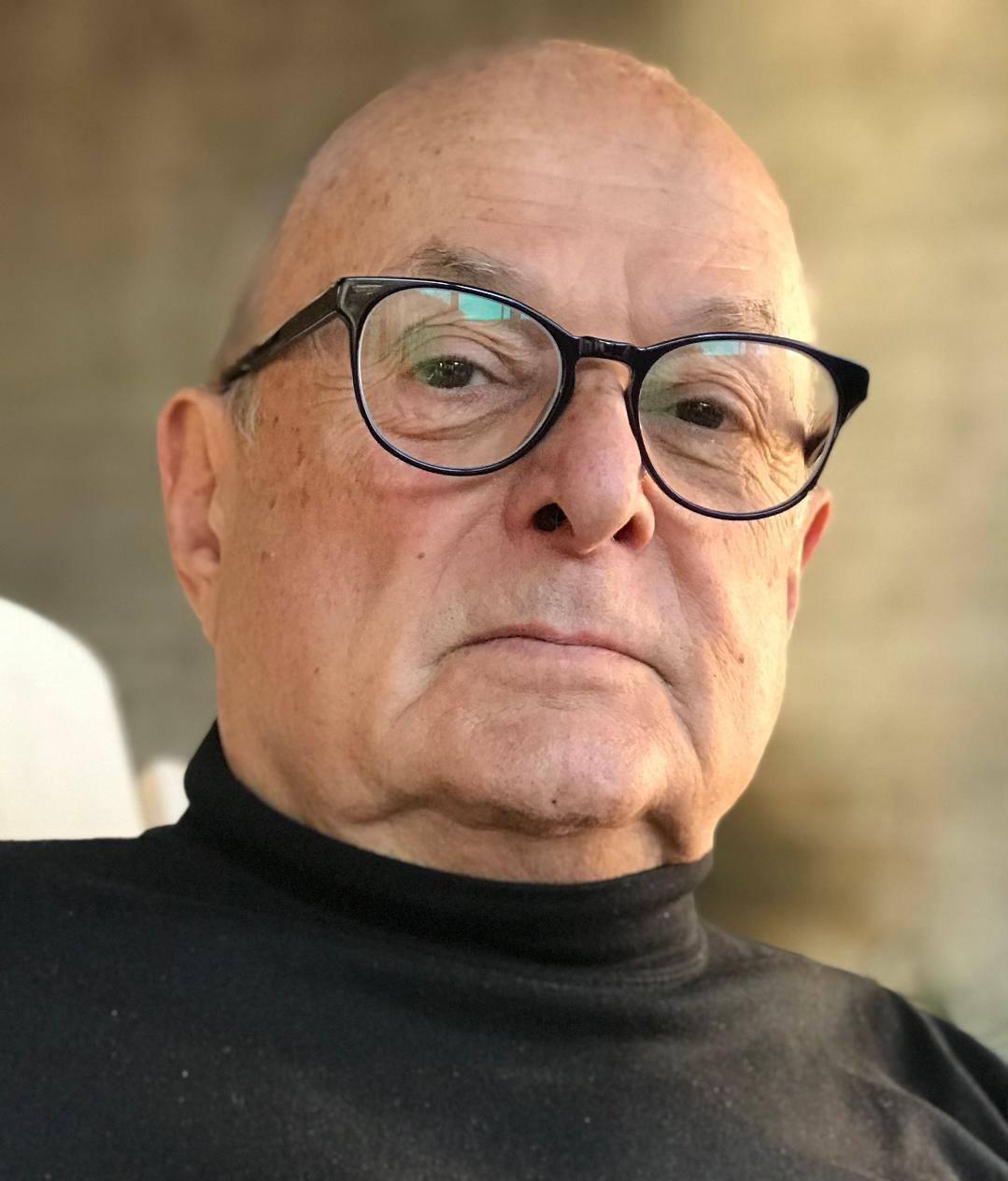
Headshot photo of George F. Jewsbury.

George F. Jewsbury (born November 26, 1941) is an American historian who has collaborated on several textbooks in the Civilization: Past & Present series. He joined authors T. Walter Wallbank, Alastair M. Taylor, and Nels M. Bailkey, beginning with the single volume fifth edition. Jewsbury has also written several books on history, including Russian Annexation of Bessarabia, 1774–1828. He was a professor of history at Oklahoma State University, and is a specialist on Russia and the USSR.

Jewsbury is the uncle of author Neal Stephenson, with whom he has collaborated on two different books, Interface (1994) and The Cobweb (1996). For these books he adopted the pseudonym J. Frederick George, and the two of them then adopted the collaborative pseudonym of Stephen Bury. It was revealed after the books' publications that Stephen Bury was a pseudonym for Stephenson and his uncle, and it was then further revealed, after several years had passed, that "J. Frederick George" was a pseudonym for George Jewsbury.

Jewsbury is today a teacher at the École Jeannine Manuel, an elite private school in Paris, France.
