= Neal Stephenson =

American speculative fiction writer (born 1959)

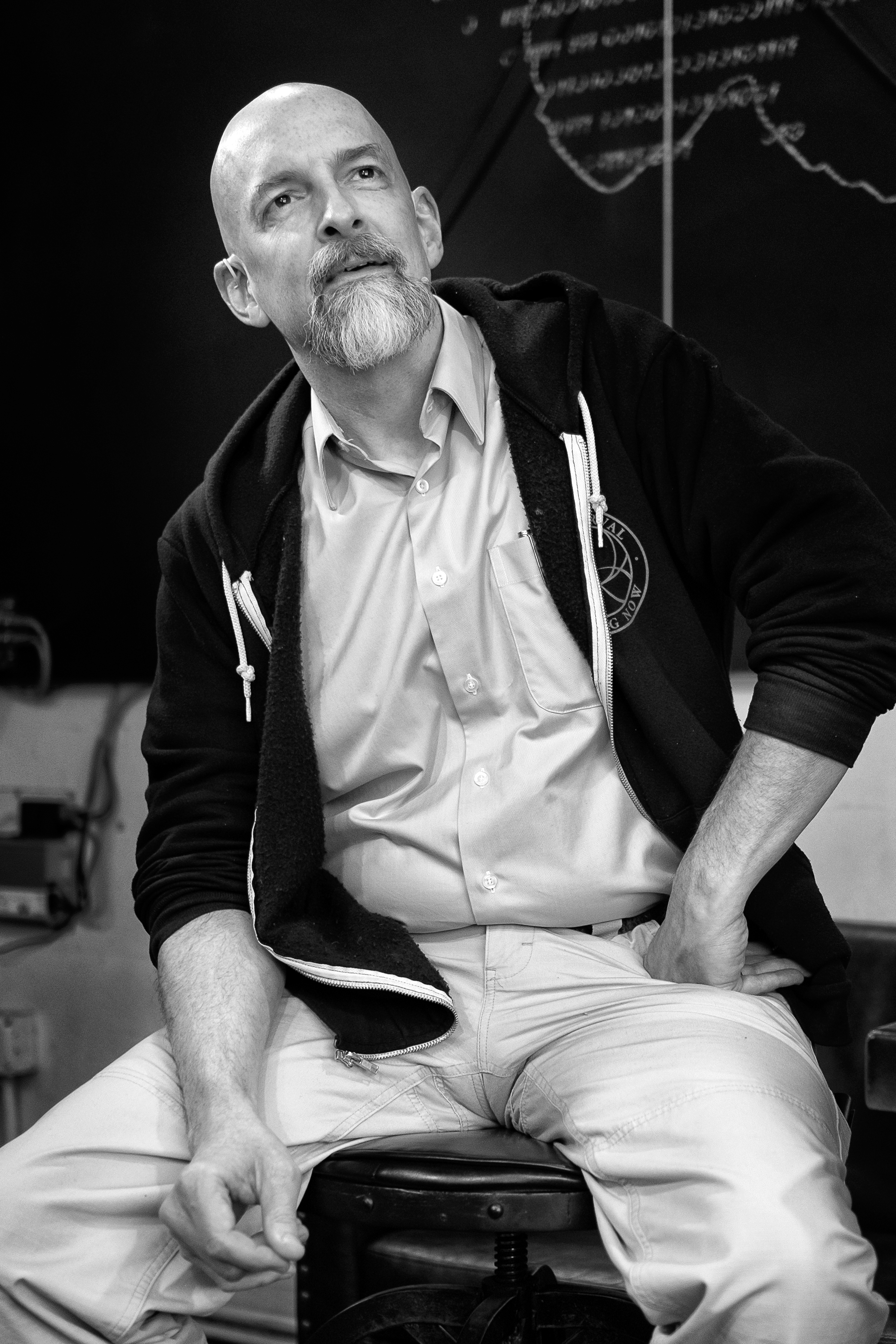
- Neal Stephenson in 2019
- Born: Neal Town Stephenson; October 31, 1959 (age 67); Fort Meade, Maryland, U.S.
- Education: Boston University (BA)
- Occupations: Novelist; short story writer; essayist
- Writing career
- Pen name: Stephen Bury (with J. Frederick George)
- Period: 1984–present
- Genres: Science fiction, speculative fiction, historical fiction, essays
- Notable awards: Hugo; Prometheus; Locus; Clarke
- Website: nealstephenson.com

Neal Town Stephenson (born October 31, 1959) is an American writer known for his works of speculative fiction. His novels have been categorized as science fiction, historical fiction, cyberpunk, and baroque. His Snow Crash (1992) was included on Time's list of the 100 best novels since 1923.

Stephenson has explored mathematics, cryptography, linguistics, philosophy, currency, and the history of science in Cryptonomicon (1999) and The Baroque Cycle (2003-2004). He also writes nonfiction essays about technology in publications such as Wired. He has written novels with his uncle, George Jewsbury ("J. Frederick George"), under the collective pseudonym Stephen Bury.

Stephenson has worked part-time as an advisor for Blue Origin, a company (founded by Jeff Bezos) developing a spacecraft and a space launch system, and also co-founded the Subutai Corporation, whose first offering is the interactive fiction project The Mongoliad. His work for the Long Now Foundation inspired his novel Anathem (2008). He was Magic Leap's chief futurist from 2014 to 2020. A collection of his essays and lectures was published as Some Remarks (2012).

== Early life ==
Born on October 31, 1959, in Fort Meade, Maryland, Stephenson came from a family of engineers and scientists; his father is a professor of electrical engineering and his paternal grandfather was a physics professor. His mother worked in a biochemistry lab and her father was a biochemistry professor. Stephenson's family moved to Champaign-Urbana, Illinois, in 1960, and to Ames, Iowa, in 1966. He graduated from Ames High School in 1977.

Stephenson studied at Boston University, first specializing in physics, then switching to geography after he found that it would allow him to spend more time on the university mainframe. He graduated in 1981 with a B.A. in geography and a minor in physics.

Since 1984, Stephenson has lived mostly in the Pacific Northwest and as of 2012 lived in Seattle with his family.

== Writing ==
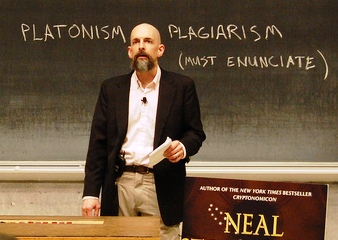
Discussing Anathem at MIT in 2008

Stephenson's debut novel, The Big U, (1984), is a satirical take on life at American Megaversity, a vast, bland, and alienating research university beset by chaotic riots. Zodiac (1988), is a thriller following a radical environmentalist in his struggle against corporate polluters. Neither novel attracted much critical attention on first publication, but both explored themes that Stephenson developed in his later work.

Stephenson's breakthrough was Snow Crash (1992), a cyberpunk or postcyberpunk novel fusing memetics, computer viruses, and other high-tech themes with Sumerian mythology and a sociological extrapolation of extreme laissez-faire capitalism and collectivism. Mike Godwin described Stephenson at this time as "a slight, unassuming grad-student type whose soft-spoken demeanor gave no obvious indication that he had written the manic apotheosis of cyberpunk science fiction." Snow Crash was named one of Time's 100 best English-language novels since 1923. In 1994, Stephenson and his uncle, J. Frederick George, published a political thriller, Interface, under the pen name "Stephen Bury"; they followed this in 1996 with The Cobweb.

Stephenson's next solo novel was The Diamond Age: Or, A Young Lady's Illustrated Primer (1995). The plot involves a weapon implanted in a character's skull, near-limitless replicators for everything from mattresses to foods, smartpaper, and air and blood-sanitizing nanobots. It is set in a world with a neo- Victorian social structure.

Cryptonomicon (1999) is a novel including concepts ranging from Alan Turing's research into codebreaking and cryptography during World War II, to a modern attempt to set up a data haven. Cryptonomicon won the Prometheus Hall of Fame Award in 2013.

The Baroque Cycle is a series of historical novels set in the 17th and 18th centuries, and in some respects a prequel to Cryptonomicon. Characters include Isaac Newton and Gottfried Wilhelm Leibniz. It was originally published in three volumes of two or three books each—Quicksilver (2003), The Confusion (2004), and The System of the World (2004)—but was subsequently republished as eight separate books: Quicksilver, King of the Vagabonds, Odalisque, Bonanza, Juncto, Solomon's Gold, Currency, and System of the World. (The titles and exact breakdown vary in different markets.) The System of the World won the Prometheus Award in 2005.

Anathem (2008) is a long, detailed work of speculative fiction. It is set in an Earthlike world, deals with mathematics and metaphysics, and draws heavily on Platonism. Anathem won the Locus Award for Best Science Fiction Novel in 2009. The book was partly inspied by the Long Now Foundation's Clock of the Long Now.

In 2010, the Subutai Corporation, of which Stephenson was named chairman, announced the production of an experimental multimedia fiction project, The Mongoliad, which centered on a narrative by Stephenson and other speculative fiction authors.

Reamde (2011) is a thriller set in the present, it centers around a group of MMORPG developers caught in the middle of Chinese cyber-criminals, Islamic terrorists, and Russian mafia. The title is a play on the common filename README.

Stephenson released a collection of essays and lectures, Some Remarks: Essays and Other Writing (2012). It also includes a new essay and a short story written specifically for this volume.

In 2013, Stephenson said he was working on a multi-volume work of historical novels that would "have a lot to do with scientific and technological themes and how those interact with the characters and civilisation during a particular span of history". He expected the first two volumes to be released in 2014. But at about the same time, he shifted his attention to a science fiction novel, Seveneves, which was completed about a year later and published in May 2015. On June 8, 2016, plans were announced to adapt Seveneves for the screen. Seveneves won the Prometheus Award for Best Novel in 2016.

In May 2016, during a video discussion with Bill Gates, Stephenson said he had just submitted the manuscript for a new historical novel—"a time travel book"—co-written with Nicole Galland, one of his Mongoliad coauthors. This book, The Rise and Fall of D.O.D.O., was released in 2017.

Fall; or, Dodge in Hell (2019) is a near-future novel that explores mind uploading into the cloud, and contains characters from Reamde, Cryptonomicon, and other books.

Termination Shock, published in 2021, is a climate fiction novel about solar geoengineering.

== Style, themes and influences ==
Scott Timberg writes that Stephenson is: "one of a handful of SF writers read passionately not only by the genres’ base of fanboys, Wired subscribers and libertarians but also by scholars and novelists who consider him a force in American fiction. It’s not just that his prose is smooth and often witty or that his intelligence is wide-ranging and speculative, but that he wrestles with concepts -- in Anathem, neo-Platonic philosophy -- in ways that would shame most 'literary' novelists. Alexander Rose notes "For thirty years Neal Stephenson’s writing has been distinguished by how he weaves minutely detailed historical and technical information into his complex stories, usually with a wicked sense of humor. Whether it’s fashion in Victorian England or World War II era cryptography, his dedication to detailed research is readily apparent:"

Stephenson read voraciously in his youth; Robert A. Heinlein was an early favorite. He is a fan of Peter Fleming, who "belongs in my personal Mount Rushmore of English prose stylists along with Gibbon, Dickens, and Churchill." He adds that "Jane Austen is the best novelist, but that’s because of characterization and wit—what she’s saying as opposed to how she’s saying it."

Stephenson cites Thomas Pynchon's influence. The Washington Post called Snow Crash "a Pynchon novel with the brakes removed." He selected books for the Long Now Foundation's Manual For Civilization. His choices ranged from Homer's Iliad and Odyssey to Roger Penrose's The Road to Reality.

== Outside of writing ==
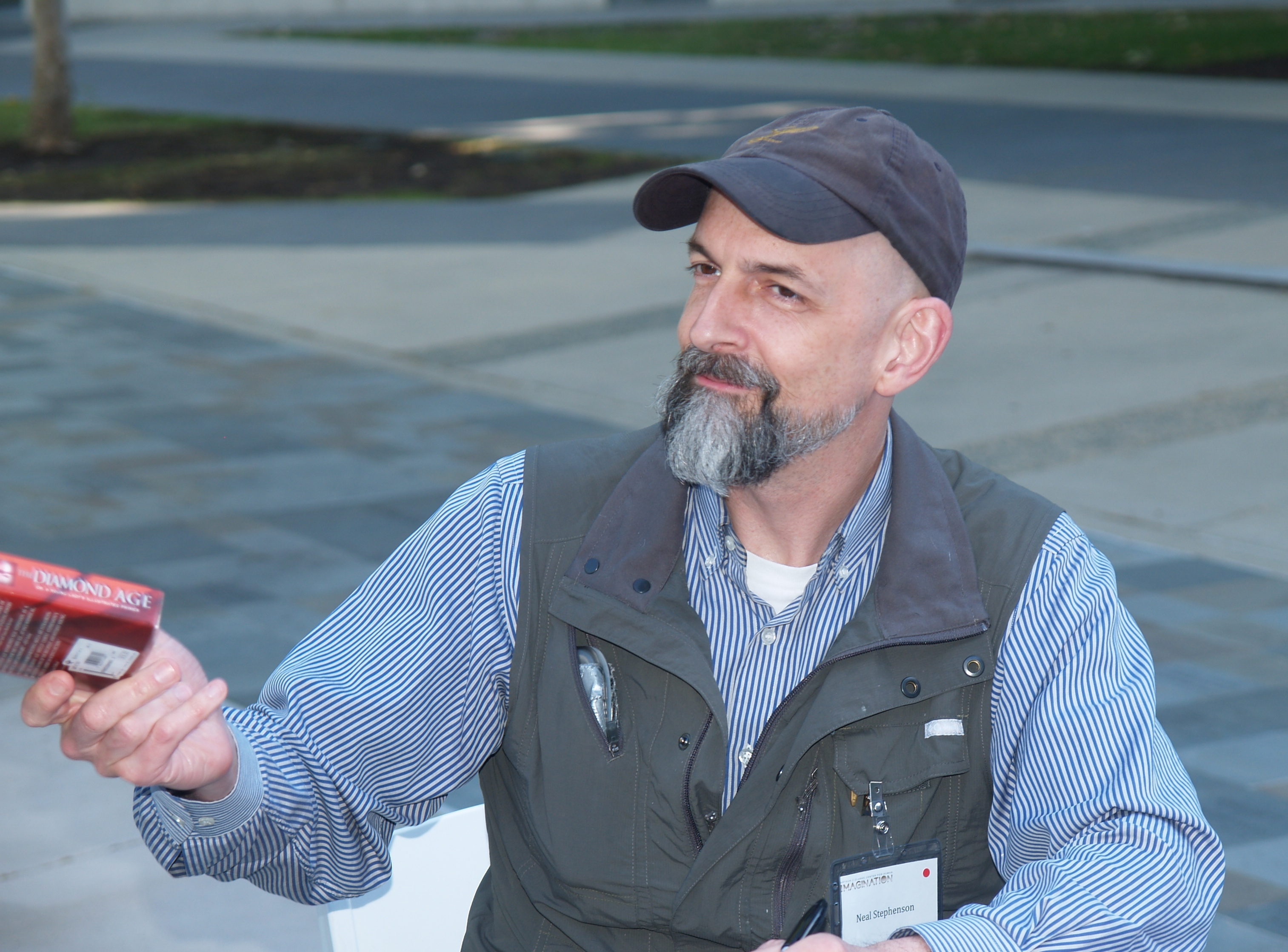
Stephenson at the Starship Century Symposium at UCSD in 2013

Stephenson worked at Blue Origin, Jeff Bezos's spaceflight company, for seven years in the early 2000s while its focus was on "novel alternate approaches to space, alternate propulsion systems, and business models." He left after Blue became a more standard aerospace company.

In 2012, Stephenson launched a Kickstarter campaign for Clang, a realistic sword-fighting fantasy game. The concept was to use motion control to provide an immersive experience. The campaign's funding goal of $500,000 was reached by the target date of July 9, 2012, but funding options remained open and the project continued to accept contributions on its official site. The project ran out of money in September 2013. This, and the circumstances around it, angered some backers, and some threatened a class action lawsuit. The Clang project ended in September 2014 without being completed. Stephenson took some responsibility for the project's failure, saying, "I probably focused too much on historical accuracy and not enough on making it sufficiently fun to attract additional investment".

In 2014, the Florida-based augmented reality company Magic Leap hired Stephenson as chief futurist. He left the company in 2020 as part of a layoff. In 2021, Stephenson and colleagues Sean Stewart and Austin Grossman released New Found Land: The Long Haul, an Audible audio drama based on the intellectual property they developed at Magic Leap.

In 2022, Stephenson launched Lamina1 to build an open source metaverse that will use smart contracts on a blockchain.

Stephenson is working on Whenere, a generative AI platform that creates content based on books. He notes that "we’re starting with Jane Austen’s Pride and Prejudice, partly because we love it, and partly because a lot of other people love it too."

== Influence ==
Stephenson's writing is influential in technology circles. Bill Gates, Sergey Brin, John Carmack, and Peter Thiel are all fans of his work. In Snow Crash, Stephenson coined the term Metaverse and popularized the term avatar in a computing context. The Metaverse inspired the inventors of Google Earth, and Snow Crash was required reading on the Xbox development team under Microsoft executive J Allard. According to academic Paul Youngquist, Snow Crash also dealt the cyberpunk genre a "killer blow". According to Publishers Weekly, Cryptonomicon is "often credited with sketching the basis for cryptocurrency".

== Publications ==
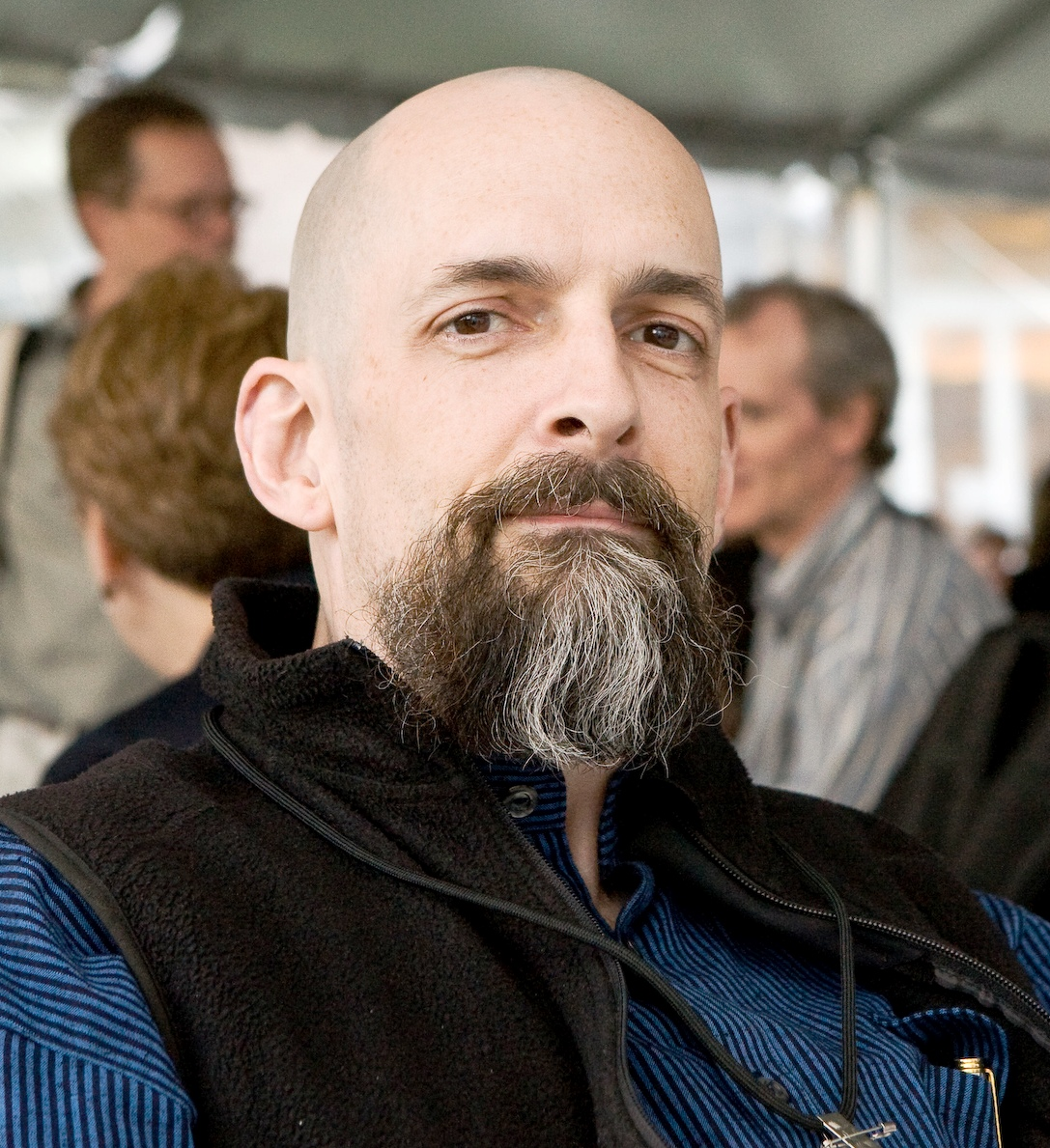
Stephenson in 2008

=== Novels ===
- The Big U (1984)
- Zodiac (1988)
- Snow Crash (1992) – British Science Fiction Association Award nominee, 1993; Clarke Award nominee, 1994
- Interface (1994) with J. Frederick George, as "Stephen Bury"
- The Diamond Age: or A Young Lady's Illustrated Primer (1995) – Hugo and Locus SF Awards winner, 1996; Nebula, Campbell and Clarke Awards nominee, 1996
- The Cobweb (1996) with J. Frederick George, as "Stephen Bury"
- Cryptonomicon (1999) – Locus SF Award winner, 2000; Hugo and Clarke Awards nominee, 2000; 2013 Prometheus Hall of Fame Award
- Quicksilver (2003), volume I of The Baroque Cycle – Clarke Award winner, 2004; Locus SF Award nominee, 2004
- The Confusion (2004), volume II of The Baroque Cycle – Locus SF Award winner, 2005
- The System of the World (2004), volume III of The Baroque Cycle – Locus SF Award winner, 2005; Prometheus Award winner, 2005; Clarke Award nominee, 2005
- Anathem (2008) – Locus SF Award winner, 2009; British Science Fiction Association Award nominee, 2008; Hugo and Clarke Awards nominee, 2009
- The Mongoliad (2010–2012)
- Reamde (2011)
- Seveneves (2015) Hugo Award for Best Novel nominee
- The Rise and Fall of D.O.D.O. (2017) with Nicole Galland
- Fall; or, Dodge in Hell (2019)
- New Found Land: The Long Haul (2021) with Austin Grossman and Sean Stewart. Audible Original audiobook.
- Termination Shock (2021)
- Polostan (2024), volume I of the Bomb Light series
- D: Heavy Water (2026), volume II of the Bomb Light series

=== Short fiction ===
- "Spew" (1994), in Hackers (1996)
- "The Great Simoleon Caper" (1995), Time
- "Excerpt from the Third and Last Volume of Tribes of the Pacific Coast" in Full Spectrum 5 (1995)
- "Jipi and the Paranoid Chip" (1997), Forbes
- "Crunch" (1997), in Disco 2000 (edited by Sarah Champion, 1998) ("Crunch" is a chapter from Cryptonomicon)
- "Atmosphæra Incognita" (2013), in Starship Century: Toward the Grandest Horizon (edited by Gregory Benford and James Benford)

=== Other fiction projects ===
- Project Hieroglyph, founded in 2011, administered by Arizona State University's Center for Science and the Imagination since 2012. Hieroglyph: Stories and Visions for a Better Future, ed. Ed Finn and Kathryn Cramer, which includes contributions by Stephenson (preface and chapter "Atmosphæra Incognita"), was published by William Morrow in September, 2014.

=== Non-fiction ===
- "Smiley's People". 1993.
- Stephenson, Neal (February 1, 1994). "In the Kingdom of Mao Bell". Wired. "A billion Chinese are using new technology to create the fastest growing economy on the planet. But while the information wants to be free, do they?"
- Stephenson, Neal (1996). "Mother Earth Mother Board". Wired. "In which the Hacker Tourist ventures forth across three continents, telling the story of the business and technology of undersea fiber-optic cables, as well as an account of the laying of the longest wire on Earth."
- "Global Neighborhood Watch". Wired. 1998. Stopping street crime in the global village.
- In the Beginning... Was the Command Line. Harper Perennial. 1999. ISBN 0-380-81593-1.
- "Communication Prosthetics: Threat, or Menace? " Whole Earth Review, Summer 2001.
- "Turn On, Tune In, Veg Out". Op-ed piece on Star Wars, in The New York Times, June 17, 2005.
- "It's All Geek To Me". Op-ed piece on the film 300 and geek culture, The New York Times, March 18, 2007.
- "Atoms of Cognition: Metaphysics in the Royal Society 1715–2010", chapter in Seeing Further: The Story of Science and the Royal Society, edited by Bill Bryson. Stephenson discusses the legacy of the rivalry between Sir Isaac Newton and Gottfried Leibniz, November 2, 2010.
- "Space Stasis". Slate. February 2, 2011. "What the strange persistence of rockets can teach us about innovation."
- "Innovation Starvation ". World Policy Journal, 2011.
- Some Remarks: Essays and Other Writing. William Morrow. 2012. ISBN 0062024434.

=== Critical studies, reviews and biography ===
- Lewis, Jon, ed. (2008). Tomorrow through the Past: Neal Stephenson and the Project of Global Modernization. Cambridge Scholars Publishing. ISBN 978-1-4438-0270-3.

In the beginning

- De Lint, Charles (June 2000). "Review of In the Beginning ... Was the Command Line". Books to Look For (column). F&SF. Vol. 98, no. 6. pp. 39–40. Archived from the original on December 27, 2004.

Snow crash

- Handrahan, Matthew (2015). "Essential Read: Snow Crash". Book Club (column). SciFiNow. Vol. 104. pp. 84–87.

Termination shock

- Rogers, Adam (November 2021). "Apocalypses now". Wired. Vol. 29, no. 11. pp. 78–87.
