= WSFA Small Press Award =

American literary prize

- Awarded for: English-language speculative fiction works that are under 20,000 words and published by a small press
- Country: United States
- Presented by: Washington Science Fiction Association
- First award: 2007; 19 years ago
- Website: wsfasmallpressaward.org

The WSFA Small Press Award was inaugurated by the Washington Science Fiction Association in 2007. The award is open to works of imaginative literature (e.g. science fiction, fantasy, horror) published in English for the first time in the previous calendar year. Furthermore, the Small Press Award is limited to short fiction—works under 20,000 words in length—that was published by a small press. The nominees are narrowed down by a panel elected by the WSFA membership, and these finalists are then judged by the entire WSFA membership to select a winner. Throughout the process, the author and publisher of each story are kept anonymous.

The winning story is announced at Capclave, the WSFA convention held in the Washington, D.C. area each October.

== Winners and finalists ==
* Winners

Year	Author	Work	Publication	Ref.
2007	Peter S. Beagle*	"El Regalo"	The Line Between	
2007	Stephanie Burgis	"Ivy and Thorn"	Grendelsong	
2007	Edd Vick	"Moon Does Run"	Electric Velocipede	
2007	Rick Klaw	"A Penny a Word"	Cross Plains Universe: Texans Celebrate Robert E. Howard	
2007	Paul Miles	"A Penny a Word"	Cross Plains Universe: Texans Celebrate Robert E. Howard	
2007	Vera Nazarian	"Port Custodial Blues"	Helix	
2007	Bryn Sparks	"Queen of Stars"	Apex Magazine	
2007	Vylar Kaftan	"Through the Cooking Glass"	Raven Electrick	
2007	Peg Robinson	"Tonino and the Incubus"	Helix	
2008	Tom Doyle	"The Wizard of Macatawa"	Paradox, #11	
2008	Erik Amundsen	"Bufo Rex"	Weird Tales, #347	
2008	John Kratman	"Harry the Crow"	Aeon Speculative Fiction, #12	
2008	Ken Pick	"Mask of the Ferret"	Infinite Space, Infinite God	
2008	Alan Loewen	"Mask of the Ferret"	Infinite Space, Infinite God	
2008	Elizabeth Bear	"Orm the Beautiful"	Clarkesworld Magazine, January 2007	
2008	Jeff VanderMeer	"The Third Bear"	Clarkesworld Magazine, April 2007	
2009	Greg Siewert*	"The Absence of Stars: Part One"	Orson Scott Card's InterGalactic Medicine Show, December 2008	
2009	K. D. Wentworth	"Drinking Problem"	Seeds of Change	
2009	Lavie Tidhar	"Hard Rain at the Fortean Café"	Aeon Speculative Fiction Magazine, #14	
2009	Christopher Sequeira	"His Last Arrow"	Gaslight Grimoire: Fantastic Tales of Sherlock Holmes	
2009	James Maxey	"Silent as Dust"	Orson Scott Card's InterGalactic Medicine Show, January 2008	
2009	Nnedi Okorafor-Mbachu	"Spider the Artist"	Seeds of Change	
2009	Luisa Maria Garcia Velasco	"The Toy Car"	Aberrant Dreams, April 2008	
2010	Tansy Rayner Roberts*	"Siren Beat"	Twelfth Planet Press	
2010	Gemma Files	"each thing i show you is a piece of my death"	Clockwork Phoenix 2	
2010	Stephen J. Barringer	"each thing i show you is a piece of my death"	Clockwork Phoenix 2	
2010	Nancy Kress	"Images of Anna"	Fantasy, September 2009	
2010	Kevin Lauderdale	"James and the Dark Grimoire"	Cthulhu Unbound	
2010	Yoon Ha Lee	"The Pirate Captain's Daughter"	Beneath Ceaseless Skies, October 2009	
2010	Kyell Gold	"Race to the Moon"	New Fables, Summer 2009	
2010	Eugie Foster	"Sinner, Baker, Fabulist, Priest; Red Mask, Black Mask, Gentleman, Beast"	Interzone, January 2009	
2010	Jeff Soesbe	"The Very Difficult Diwali of Sub-Inspector Gurushankar Rajaram"	DayBreak Magazine, October 2009	
2011	Carrie Vaughn*	"Amaryllis"	Lightspeed, June 2010	
2011	Sarah Monette	"After the Dragon"	Fantasy, January 2010	
2011	Jack McDevitt	"The Cassandra Project"	Lightspeed, June 2010	
2011	Catherynne M. Valente	"The Days of Flaming Motorcycles"	Dark Faith	
2011	R. J. Astruc	"Enid and the Prince"	Worlds Next Door	
2011	Jean Marie Ward	"Lord Bai's Discovery"	Dragon's Lure	
2012	Tansy Rayner Roberts*	"The Patrician"	Love and Romanpunk	
2012	E. Lily Yu	"The Cartographer Wasps and the Anarchist Bees"	Clarkesworld Magazine, April 2011	
2012	Joanne Anderton	"Flowers in the Shadow of the Garden"	Hope	
2012	Megan Arkenberg	"Lessons from a Clockwork Queen"	Fantasy, September 2011	
2012	David Klecha	"A Militant Peace"	Clarkesworld Magazine, November 2011	
2012	Tobias S. Buckell	"A Militant Peace"	Clarkesworld Magazine, November 2011	
2012	Ferrett Steinmetz	"Sauerkraut Station"	GigaNotoSaurus, November 2011	
2012	Chris Dolley	"What Ho, Automaton!"	Shadow Conspiracy, Volume II	
2012	Lawrence M. Schoen	"Yesterday's Taste"	Transtories	
2013	Ken Liu*	"Good Hunting"	Strange Horizons, October 2012	
2013	Pamela K. Kinney	"Bottled Spirits"	Buzzy Mag, June 2012	
2013	Ken Liu	"The Bookmaking Habits of Select Species"	Lightspeed, August 2012	
2013	Jason Nahrung	"Mornington Ride"	Fablecroft	
2013	Lawrence M. Schoen	"Coca Xocolati"	ReDeus: Divine Tales	
2013	Hildy Silverman	"The Six Million Dollar Mermaid"	Mermaids 13: Tales from the Sea	
2013	Carrie Vaughn	"Astrophilia"	Clarkesworld Magazine, July 2012	
2014	Alex Shvartsman*	"Explaining Cthulhu to Grandma"	Orson Scott Card's InterGalactic Medicine Show, April 2013	
2014	Gemma Files	"Trap-Weed"	Clockwork Phoenix 4	
2014	Maria Dahvana Headley	"The Traditional"	Lightspeed, May 2013	
2014	Naomi Kritzer	"Bits"	Clarkesworld Magazine, October 2013	
2014	David McDonald	"Set Your Face Towards the Darkness"	Tales of Australia: Great Southern Land	
2014	Sean McMullen	"Acts of Chivalry"	Tales of Australia: Great Southern Land	
2014	DK Mok	"Morning Star"	One Small Step: An Anthology of Discoveries	
2014	Jonathan Shipley	"Like a Bat Out of Hell"	After Death	
2015	Ursula Vernon*	"Jackalope Wives"	Apex Magazine, January 2014	
2015	Day Al-Mohamed	"The Lesser Evil"	Sword & Laser	
2015	Tom Crosshill	"The Magician and Laplace's Demon"	Clarkesworld Magazine, December 2014	
2015	Dirk Flinthart	"Vanilla"	Kaleidoscope	
2015	Karen Healey	"Careful Magic"	Kaleidoscope	
2015	Kat Howard	"All of Our Past Places"	The Journal of Unlikely Cartography, June 2014	
2015	Rosaleen Love	"Qasida"	Secret Lives of Books	
2015	C. S. MacCath	"N is for Nanomachine"	A is for Apocalypse	
2015	Tansy Rayner Roberts	"Cookie Cutter Superhero"	Kaleidoscope	
2016	Martin L. Shoemaker*	"Today I Am Paul"	Clarkesworld Magazine, August 2015	
2016	Stephanie Burgis	"The Art of Deception"	Insert Title Here	
2016	Beth Cato	"Headspace"	Cats in Space	
2016	Larry Hodges	"Leashing the Muse"	Space and Time, May 2015	
2016	Naomi Kritzer	"Cat Pictures Please"	Clarkesworld Magazine, January 2015	
2016	Tanith Lee	"Burn Her"	Dancing Through the Fire	
2016	Hannu Rajaniemi	"The Haunting of Apollo A7LB"	Hannu Rajaniemi: Collected Fiction	
2016	Robert Reed	"The Empress in Her Glory"	Clarkesworld Magazine, April 2015	
2016	Leona Wisoker	"Leftovers"	Cats in Space	
2017	Ursula Vernon*	"The Tomato Thief"	Apex Magazine, January 2016	
2017	Aliette de Bodard	"A Salvaging of Ghosts"	Beneath Ceaseless Skies, March 2016	
2017	Neil James Hudson	"The Mytilenian Delay"	Hyperpowers	
2017	Walter H. Hunt	"Radio Silence"	Alien Artifacts	
2017	Yoon Ha Lee	"Foxfire, Foxfire"	Beneath Ceaseless Skies, March 2016	
2017	Christine Lucas	"Vengeance Sewn With Fey Cord"	The Future Fire , April 2016	
2017	Margaret Ronald	"The Witch's Knives"	Strange Horizons, October 2016	
2017	Brad R. Torgersen	"Jupiter or Bust"	Orson Scott Card's InterGalactic Medicine Show	
2017	Fran Wilde	"Only Their Shining Beauty Was Left"	Shimmer, September 2016	
2018	Suzanne Palmer*	"The Secret Life of Bots"	Clarkesworld Magazine, September 2017	
2018	Kelly Barnhill	"Probably Still the Chosen One"	Lightspeed, February 2017	
2018	Pip Coen	"Floaters Can't Float"	Compelling Science Fiction, April 2017	
2018	Brandon Daubs	"A Vague Inclination to Please"	All Hail Our Robot Conquerers	
2018	Jonathan Edelstein	"Oba Oyinbo"	Orson Scott Card's InterGalactic Medicine Show, October 2017	
2018	Wendy Nikel	"Through Milkweed and Gloom"	Submerged	
2018	Richard Parks	"The Cat of Five Virtues"	Tales of the Sunrise Lands	
2018	Karina Sumner-Smith	"The Oracle and the Warlord"	The Sum of Us	
2019	Virginia M. Mohlere*	"The Thing in the Walls Wants Your Small Change"	Luna Station Quarterly, May 2018	
2019	Brooke Bolander	"The Tale of the Three Beautiful Raptor Sisters, and the Prince Who Was Made of Meat"	Uncanny Magazine, July-August 2018	
2019	E. A. Brenner	"Familiar in Her Angles"	Metaphorosis, September 2018	
2019	Leslie Burton-Lopez	"Baggage"	When to Now: A Time Travel Anthology	
2019	Hal J. Friesen	"The Djinni and the Accountant"	Fire: Demons, Dragons, and Djinn	
2019	Alix E. Harrow	"A Witch's Guide to Escape: A Practical Compendium of Portal Fantasies"	Apex Magazine, February 2018	
2019	Arkady Martine	"The Hydraulic Emperor"	Uncanny Magazine, January-February 2018	
2019	DK Mok	"The Spider and the Stars"	Glass and Gardens: Solarpunk Summers	
2020	Charlotte Honigman*	"The Partisan and the Witch"	Skull & Pestle: New Tales of Baba Yaga	
2020	Beth Cato	"The Blighted Godling of Company Town H"	Beneath Ceaseless Skies, January 2019	
2020	L. Deni Colter	"The Weight of Mountains"	DreamForge, June 2019	
2020	Judi Fleming	"The Sound of Distant Stars"	Footprints in the Stars	
2020	A. T. Greenblatt	"Give the Family My Love"	Clarkesworld Magazine, February 2019	
2020	Ada Hoffman	"Fairest of All"	The Future Fire , August 2019	
2020	Juliet Kemp	"Somewhere Else, Nowhere Else"	Portals	
2020	Suzanne Palmer	"Painter of Trees"	Clarkesworld Magazine, June 2019	
2021	T. Kingfisher*	"Metal Like Blood in the Dark"	Uncanny Magazine, September-October 2020	
2021	Matthew R. Davis	"Heritage Hill"	Outback Horrors Down Under	
2021	Rebecca Enzor	"Myself"	DreamForge, December 2020	
2021	Feng Gooi	"Memories Taste Best When Marinated with Sadness"	Hexagon, Fall 2020	
2021	Brian Hugenbruch	"Foster-Child of Silence and Slow Time"	My Battery Is Low and It Is Getting Dark	
2021	Jo Miles	"The Longest Season in the Garden of the Tea Fish"	Strange Horizons, April 2020	
2021	Jennifer R. Povey	"Guest Athletes"	The Phantom Games: Dimensions Unknown Vol. III	
2021	Caias Ward	"Reformed"	Mysterion, March 2020	
2021	John Wiswell	"Open House on Haunted Hill"	Diabolical Plots, June 2020	
2022	Steven Harper*	"Eight Mile and the City"	When Worlds Collide	
2022	Elly Bangs	"Space Pirate Queen of the Ten Billion Utopias"	Lightspeed, November 2021	
2022	Sharon Lee	"Standing Orders"	Derelicts	
2022	Steve Miller	"Standing Orders"	Derelicts	
2022	DK Mok	"The Birdsong Fossil"	Multispecies Cities: Solarpunk Urban Futures	
2022	Suzan Palumbo	"Laughter Among the Trees"	The Dark, February 2021	
2022	Y. M. Pang	"Dress of Ash"	Seasons Between Us: Tales of Identities and Memories	
2022	Ryan Priest	"A Universe All to Himself"	Metaphorosis, April 2021	
2022	Alexandra Seidel	"From the Ashes Flew the Ladybug"	The Deadlands, November 2021	
2022	Adam R. Shannon	"A Stranger Goes Ashore"	Beneath Ceaseless Skies, April 2021	
2022	Kristina Ten	"Fisherman's Soup"	Mermaids Monthly, May 2021	
2023	Naomi Kritzer*	"The Dragon Project"	Clarkesworld Magazine, March 2022	
2023	Marie Brennan	"This Living Hand"	Sunday Morning Transport, February 2022	
2023	Ana Gardner	"Simons, Far and Near"	Cast of Wonders, February 2022	
2023	R. Z. Held	"Ashes of a Cinnamon Fire"	Shattering The Glass Slipper	
2023	Taylor Jones	"Possession"	Reckoning, September 2022	
2023	Juliet Kemp	"At the Lighthouse, Out by the Othersea"	Uncanny Magazine, July-August 2022	
2023	Angus McIntyre	"In the Belly of the Whale"	Trenchcoats, Towers, and Trolls: Cyberpunk Fairy Tales	
2023	Alyse Winters	"Not the Youngest, Nor the Prettiest, But Someone Else"	Shattering The Glass Slipper	
2024	Kai Holmwood*	"A Bowl of Soup on the 87th Floor"	DreamForge Anvil, March 2023	
2024	Annika Barranti Klein	"Six Meals at Fanelli's"	Fusion Fragment, April 2023	
2024	Barbara Krasnoff	"Baby Golem"	Jewish Futures	
2024	M. L. Krishnan	"Interstate Mohinis"	Diabolical Plots, June 2023	
2024	Naomi Kritzer	"Better Living Through Algorithms"	Clarkesworld Magazine, May 2023	
2024	Jennifer R. Povey	"Machines"	Game On!	
2024	Alex T. Singer	"Nothing But the Gods on Their Backs"	Metaphorosis, June 2023	
2024	LaShawn M. Wanak	"By the Works of Her Hands"	Never Too Old to Save the World	
2025	Pat Murphy	"A Catalog of 21st Century Ghosts"	Lightspeed, December 2024	
2025	M. A. Akins	"All We Ever Had"	Cosmic Roots & Eldritch Shores, August 2024	
2025	Leah Andelsmith	"Within the Seed Lives the Fruit"	Reckoning, June 2024	
2025	Elly Bangs	"Bespoke"	Embodies Exegesis: Transfeminine Cyberpunk Futures	
2025	E. Florian Gludovacz	"A Hero’s Tale"	Cosmic Roots & Eldritch Shores, July 2024	
2025	Íde Hennessy	"A Slightly Different Sunrise from Mercury, Nevada"	Strange Horizons, November 2024	
2025	Marissa Lingen	"A Pilgrimage to the God of High Places"	Beneath Ceaseless Skies, May 2024	
2025	Michael H. Payne	"Collaborators"	Cosmic Roots & Eldritch Shores, December 2024	
