= Dragon Award =

Dragon Awards are American literary and media awards presented annually since 2016 by Dragon Con for excellence in various categories of science fiction, fantasy, and horror.

Dragon Award(s) may also refer to:

- Dragon Awards (Gothenburg), a set of awards given annually at the Gothenburg Film Festival in Sweden

== See also ==
- Blue Dragon Film Awards, awarded to films by the South Korean newspaper Sports Chosun
