= The Twisted Ones =

2019 horror novel by T. Kingfisher

- Author: T. Kingfisher
- Audio read by: Hillary Huber
- Language: English
- Published: 2019
- Publisher: Gallery/Saga Press
- Publication place: United States
- Media type: Print (hardback, paperback), ebook, audiobook
- Pages: 400 pages
- ISBN: 978-1534429574 First edition US hardcover

The Twisted Ones is a 2019 horror novel written by Ursula Vernon, under the penname of T. Kingfisher. It was published in the United States and United Kingdom in 2019 through Gallery/Saga Press.

Vernon drew inspiration for The Twisted Ones from Arthur Machen’s short horror story “The White People” and the novel is a contemporary take on the story.

== Synopsis ==
Mouse is a 30-something book editor. Her cruel and abusive grandmother has died, and Mouse travels to North Carolina to clear out her home. Mouse's step-grandfather, Frederick Cotgrave, died some years earlier. Mouse discovers his diary, in which he documents his obsession with something called "The Green Book", his contentious relationship with his wife, and his own descent into madness. Mouse also finds Frederick's version of "The Green Book", typed from memory.

Already unnerved by the isolation of the house in the woods, Mouse is terrified to discover twisted versions of deer roaming about at night, including one in particular that comes right up to the house and repeatedly taps on the window, seemingly looking for something inside the house. When her dog, Bongo, leads her into the realm of the White People and their Effigies (the titular "twisted ones"), Mouse barely escapes with her sanity intact. Bongo goes missing, and reappears days later with a message begging for help.

With the help of neighbor Foxy, a brassy, 60-something ex-hippie who lives across the road, Mouse re-enters the realm of the Effigies to try to rescue whoever is trapped there. Captured by legions of Effigies, they encounter Anna, a woman who has been trapped in the realm of magic since the late 1960s. The race of beings (the White People) which created the Effigies have long died out, and the Effigies have been breeding Anna and a very old man named Uriah to try to recreate them. This has failed, and now Anna has lured Mouse into the realm so she can be freed and Mouse can take her place.

Anna agrees to escape with Mouse and Foxy's help, killing Uriah to delay the Effigies. During the escape, Mouse realizes that two of the Effigies were actually what remained of some of Anna's children, and one Effigy in particular (made of doll parts) was created by using items she removed from her grandmother's home, resulting in it channeling some of her malice to be extra aggressive towards them. Foxy's foresight in bringing a gun helps Mouse escape when Anna betrays them at the last moment. When the Effigy that was earlier stalking Mouse and tapping on her window attacks the two of them back at the grandmother's home, Mouse realizes that this one has actually been made from her step-grandfather's body, and that it had presumably been attempting to regain the diary Mouse had found (Cotgrave having been previously driven to obsession and insanity by it beforehand). She and Foxy end up burning the house down to escape.

== Release ==
The Twisted Ones was published in hardback format in the United States and United Kingdom through Gallery/Saga Press in October 2019. A paperback edition was also released in the United States alongside the hardback edition; Titan Books released a paperback edition in the United Kingdom in March 2020.

An audiobook adaptation narrated by Hillary Huber was released via Simon & Schuster Audio in October 2019.

== Reception ==
Critical reception for The Twisted Ones has been generally positive. Common praise for the novel centered upon the character of Mouse and the book's atmosphere and tension, with Starburst writing that "Like the best occult fiction, the novel’s building sense of unease comes from the unexpected, the incongruous and the unexplained." Other elements of praise included what the Chicago Review of Books called a "rich, regional narrative voice". The British Fantasy Society's Sarah Deeming commented that "knowing that Mouse would be OK lost a bit of the tension", as this was detailed in the beginning of the book, but that "As an atmospheric, creepy read, The Twisted Ones has some great moments."

=== Awards ===
Year	Award	Result	Ref.
2020	British Fantasy Award for Best Horror Novel	Finalist	
2020	Dragon Award for Best Horror Novel	Won	
2020	Locus Award for Best Horror Novel	Finalist	
