= A House with Good Bones =

2023 horror novel by T. Kingfisher

- Author: T. Kingfisher
- Cover artist: Karolis Strautniekas
- Language: English
- Genre: Horror; Southern Gothic
- Publisher: Tor Books
- Publication date: 28 Mar 2023
- Publication place: United States
- Pages: 256
- Awards: 2023 Dragon Award for Best Horror Novel; 2024 Locus Award for Best Horror Novel
- ISBN: 978-1-250-82980-1

A House with Good Bones is a 2023 Southern Gothic horror novel by Ursula Vernon, writing under the pen name T. Kingfisher. The novel centers on Samantha Montgomery, a woman who experiences strange events when she returns to her ancestral North Carolina home. The novel won the 2023 Dragon Award for best horror novel and the 2024 Locus Award for Best Horror Novel.

== Plot ==
Archaeoentomologist Samantha Montgomery returns to her family home in rural North Carolina. The house once belonged to her deceased grandmother, Gran Mae, with whom the family had a fraught relationship. Gran Mae was verbally and emotionally abusive toward her daughter and grandchildren, often threatening them that the "underground children" would eat them if they misbehaved. Sam notices that her mother Edith has changed. Edith seems anxious, and the decor of Sam's childhood home has been changed significantly. Whenever Sam comments on a negative memory about Gran Mae, Edith immediately contradicts her, as if someone is listening.

There is a mysterious lack of insects in Gran Mae's prized rose garden, but ladybugs repeatedly swarm the house. Sam has several dreams of a woman combing her hair and dropping rose petals onto her. In a photo from high school, Sam sees a human hand reaching toward her ankle from under Gran Mae's rosebushes. When Edith is at work, Sam finds disturbing sticky notes on Edith's bathroom mirror. She also finds a jar of human teeth buried under the rosebushes.

Sam speaks to her mother's gardener Phil, who is concerned for Edith but has no explanation for her recent changes. A wildlife rehabilitator named Gail tells Sam that she and Gran Mae were both witches, although they had very different philosophies about magic. Gran Mae's magic was poured into her roses, while Gail's is based on her animals, particularly vultures.

As vultures swirl above the house, Gran Mae's ghost appears. The apparition appears to be made of roses and ladybugs. Gran Mae orders the family to sit down for Sunday dinner. Gran Mae's thorns cut them whenever they upset her. Gran Mae tells stories about her father Elgar, also a sorcerer, and his other creations, the underground children. Phil arrives and Gran Mae traps him inside, forcing him to join the dinner. Gail arrives and banishes Gran Mae; the ghost leaves, but states that without her protection the house will be vulnerable.

The entire house immediately falls downward into a dark, unexplainable place. Misshapen monsters, the underground children, begin entering the house and attacking them. Sam cut her hands on the thorns of Gran Mae's roses, using their magic to destroy the creatures. Gail summons a vulture to lead them to safety.

The house's destruction is blamed on a sinkhole. Edith moves back to Arizona with Sam.

== Major themes ==
Maya Gittelman of Tor.com writes that the novel explores the "central tension of what might be known as 'southern hospitality': kindness without goodness, ill-gotten power, and violent, xenophobic insecurity." By exploring the complicated characteristics of white Southern families, Kingfisher "confronts the toxic white Southern ideal of 'nice and normal'". Gittelman also writes that Gran Mae's biases include fatphobia, which is "engrained in capitalistic American whiteness". Kingfisher uses the protagonist Sam as a "fully realized fat girl scientist fighting real horrors and bigoted family members."

== Reception ==
Publishers Weekly gave the novel a starred review, calling Kingfisher "the best in the business at using horror and fantasy to explore abusive relationships and how to escape them." The review also called Sam a "charmingly kooky narrator". In a starred review for Library Journal, Marlene Harris recommended the novel for "lovers of Southern gothics [and] readers who like their horror to sneak up on them." Bookpage also gave the novel a starred review, praising the novel's combination of horror and humor. The review compared the novel to the 2017 horror film Get Out, in that "both works derive their frightening power from placing reasonable people in unreasonable circumstances and forcing them to respond".

Writing for Grimdark Magazine, John Mauro gave the novel four out of five stars. He praised Sam's narrative style, including the diversions on insect life that "acted as a lighthearted balance to the dark family secrets". Mauro felt that "the main plot twist is painfully obvious from early in the book" and "the various plot threads are tied up a little too easily". Lacy Baugher Milas praised Kingfisher's ability to tell a well-crafted story in under 300 pages. Milas writes that "although you may find that the ending of A House with Good Bones ties things up a little too neatly, Kingfisher’s startlingly well-written prose is always worth the price of admission". Maya Gittelman of Tor.com wrote that "the book is most effective when it unapologetically leans into the grotesque truth of a land’s legacy, and the harm a single powerful person’s hatred can enact". Gittelman also noted that "the lighter tone and touch of romance felt inconsistent at times with a plot dealing so heavily in monstrous whiteness".

In a review for Locus, Adrienne Martini called the novel "a nice enough story to pass the time with", though she felt it was inferior to Kingfisher's recent novel Nettle & Bone.

Awards
Year	Award	Category	Result	Ref.
2023	Dragon Award	Horror Novel	Won	
2024	Locus Award	Horror Novel	Won	
2024	British Fantasy Award	Horror Novel	Shortlisted	
