= Clocktaur Wars =

Romantasy series by T. Kingfisher

The Clocktaur Wars series is a fantasy romance duology by Ursula Vernon, published under the pen name T. Kingfisher. It is set in the World of the White Rat, alongside other series like Swordheart and The Saint of Steel. Clockwork Boys, the first novel in the duology, was originally published in November 2017 by Red Wombat Studio, followed by The Wonder Engine in 2018. Both novels were later re-released by Titan Books. A review in Locus called it "a grimly funny adventure story."

== Synopsis ==
=== Clockwork Boys ===
A group of three criminals and a scholar go on a journey to discover the origins of the Clockwork Boys, an army of raiding automatons from rival Anuket City. Slate, a forger, leads the group, to the dismay of the misogynistic and sheltered Learned Edmund; she is joined by her friend and once-lover Brennen, as well as a disgraced paladin named Caliban who went on a murderous rampage while possessed and still carries the demon's corpse in his soul. The three criminals, coerced into the mission by a magic tattoo, do not expect to reach Anuket City alive. Learned Edmund naively believes their mission is possible.

Their route to Anuket City is blocked by raiding Clockwork Boys, so they are forced to detour through the mountains. Along the way, Brennen bristles as Slate and Caliban discover a mutual attraction and Edmund learns to cope with being in the presence of a woman. Slate discovers that she does want to live when her horse bolts during a storm. Caliban rescues her. Afterwards, she tries to kiss him, but he is worried about taking advantage of her in a vulnerable state and insults her badly during his explanation.

The group gets lost in the uncanny and dangerous Vagrant Hills. Caliban and Brennen are kidnapped by deer-people called rune. Their leader, a demon-possessed shaman, tries to bargain with Caliban by offering to remove the dead demon from his soul. He refuses, knowing that her demon will possess him as soon as the other demon's corpse is removed. Slate rescues Caliban and Brennen, as well as a captive gnoll named Grimehug. While in the Vagrant Hills, Slate stumbles across the notebook of Learned Amadai, a scholar who sent the first reports of Clockwork Boys back to Edmund's order.

Grimehug, who is from Anuket City, offers to connect the group to the gnoll community there. Many gnolls make a living by shepherding Clockwork Boys, which Grimehug calls clocktaurs, out of the city from the factory where they are created. The group finally reaches Anuket City and realizes that surviving the journey has brought them to a bigger challenge: stopping the clocktaurs.

=== The Wonder Engine ===
Slate and Brennen enter Anuket City's underworld to try and find out who is funding the creation of the clocktaurs. Their task is complicated by Slate's bitter history with Boss Horsehead, the leader of organized crime in the city. Meanwhile, Caliban and Learned Edmund discover the location of the factory and try to find Edmund's lost predecessor, Learned Amadai. Edmund meets one of his research heroes, Ashes Magnus, who becomes an ally to the group.

The group learns that a universally fatal sickness called werkblight has recently reached Anuket City. The locals blame it on the gnolls, who came to the city around the same time as the illness. An undercaste of gnolls is paid by the city to remove the bodies of werkblight victims. The group learns that the gnolls deliver the bodies to the same factory where the clocktaurs are created.

Slate is betrayed by an information dealer and kidnapped by Boss Horsehead. Brennen and Caliban rescue her before Boss Horsehead has a chance to torture her to death. This forces the group to go underground, first hiding with Ashes Magnus and then in the gnoll community. While in hiding, Slate and Caliban admit their attraction to each other and become a couple, much to Brennen's displeasure.

Slate, Brennen, and Caliban hide among werkblight corpses and are delivered by the gnolls to the clocktaur factory. They discover that the clocktaurs are not created by human hands, but by ancient machines called wonder engines. Two different wonder engines have been connected to create the clocktaurs by the demon-possessed corpse of Learned Amadai. Slate disables the wonder engines while Caliban kills and exorcises Amadai.

Their mission appears to be complete until Brennen suddenly attacks Caliban. While Caliban rejected the rune shaman's offer, Brennen accepted her demon in order to get the group out of the Vagrant Hills. He has carried the demon in secret, but it overwhelms him at the clocktaur factory and he nearly kills Caliban. Caliban feels the presence of his god for the first time since his own possession. With the god's help, he is able to bind the demon, but has to kill Brennen in the process. Slate tries to stop him, but is no match for him when he has the god's power on his side.

Caliban and Slate escape from the factory and return to the gnoll community. Slate is overcome with grief and furious with Caliban, but he insists on escorting her and Edmund back home. Edmund and Slate realize that the werkblight is actually an allergy to gnolls, which can be treated. Caliban and Slate confess their love to each other and reconcile on the way back home. As the book ends, Caliban cheerfully considers a future as Slate's bodyguard in her upcoming criminal enterprises.
