= What Stalks the Deep =

2025 novella by T. Kingfisher

- Author: T. Kingfisher
- Language: English
- Series: Sworn Soldier #3
- Genre: Horror
- Set in: West Virginia
- Published: September 30, 2025
- Publisher: Tor Nightfire
- Publication place: United States
- Pages: 192 (hardcover)
- ISBN: 9781250354921
- Preceded by: What Feasts at Night

What Stalks the Deep is a 2025 horror novella by Ursula Vernon, writing under the pen name T. Kingfisher. It is the third novella in the Sworn Soldier series. Elements of the plot are loosely based on the shoggoth, a fictional species that appears in the novella At the Mountains of Madness by H.P. Lovecraft.

== Plot ==
Alex Easton receives an urgent summons from Dr. James Denton, an American physician who assisted ka (Note: The fictional Gallacian language contains seven sets of personal pronouns. This includes a set of pronouns specifically for soldiers, regardless of their sex assigned at birth.) during the events of What Moves the Dead. Denton's cousin Oscar has vanished while exploring an abandoned coal mine. Oscar's most recent letters stated that a mysterious red light had appeared inside the cave and that he planned to investigate. Oscar has now vanished, and a cryptic telegraph has warned Denton away from Hollow Elk Mine.

Easton and Angus travel to West Virginia. They are accompanied by Denton and his lover, chemist John Ingold. They first encounter Oscar's companion Roger, an incompetent drunkard who provides no helpful information. Easton's group begins exploring the mine. As the exploration continues, they hear unexplained noises, see a red light, and eventually see a glowing humanoid figure.

Outside the mine, villagers summon Dr. Denton to the scene of a supposed bear attack. While Denton treats the survivors, Easton and Ingold examine the corpse of a victim. The body has been completely eviscerated; they suspect foul play. Easton's group returns to the mine, where they find a chamber covered in a nacre-like substance. Soon afterwards, Easton's group finds a humanoid creature in the cave.

The creature calls itself Fragment. Fragment was once part of a hive mind and has become separated from the larger body, which lies beneath the nacre of the cave. The hive mind, which calls itself the “wholeness”, wishes only to be left alone. It regularly sends sentries into the outside world to monitor for human incursions. Fragment has recently been awoken, as the previous sentry has gone missing.

Easton's horse is attacked by a bear-like creature. The next day, Roger visits the mine, feeling guilty for abandoning Oscar. Easton is attacked by Roger's dog Thunder. The dog reveals itself to be the missing Sentry, the culprit behind the recent attacks. Sentry has developed a strong sense of individualism and does not want to rejoin the wholeness.

Fragment and Angus kill Sentry. Denton tries to kill Fragment, but Easton and Ingold convince him that this would be morally wrong. Easton realizes that another piece of Sentry has survived. This creature pursues ka through the mine. Easton uses flammable gases to set off an explosion, killing the remaining part of Sentry.

Easton's companions drill through the nacre, allowing Fragment to rejoin the wholeness. Denton hires Roger to guard the mine, keeping out human intruders. The wholeness also plans to keep guard for humans, ensuring to send multiple sentries in the future to ensure that none will become like Sentry.

== Reception and awards ==
Marion Deeds of fantasyliterature.com gave the novella five stars, writing that Kingfisher channels Lovecraft effectively, but "with a different sensibility and a much different resolution" than her inspiration. Deeds praised the exploration of ethics within the novel, particularly the contrast between Easton and Denton as they react to Fragment. Easton regrets the destruction of a potentially sentient creature from the first novella, and wishes to avoid repeating that event. Denton is traumatized by the recent American Civil War and wishes to swiftly destroy Fragment. Deeds concluded that the "exploration of posttraumatic stress, from which both Easton and Denton suffer" was a highlight of the novella.

Bethan Hindmarch of Fantasy Hive notes that elements of the mine and its mysterious lights may have been inspired by the bwca and corpse candles, both of which appear in Welsh mythology. Hindmarch felt that the series as a whole deals with different subgenera of horror. The first novella was about Gothic horror, the second about folk horror, and the third was an example of Lovecraftian horror. The reviewer felt that the third novella was the least scary of the three Sworn Soldier books, while having the strongest sense of mystery. Ray Pale of Bookreporter wrote that the story "moves so deftly between horror, thriller and dark fantasy that it is impossible to categorize it." Palen felt that Kingfisher's distinct style would make the work enjoyable to a wide variety of readers.

Fiona Denton of Grimdark Magazine called the book "less overtly horrifying" than previous entries in the series, with a focus on psychological dread appropriate for a story set in an abandoned mine. Denton also praised the novella's humor and Easton's narrative voice, hoping for more entries in the series to be published in the future.

The book was a finalist for the 2026 Locus Award for Best Novella and the 2026 Hugo Award for Best Novella.
