= Edmund R. Schubert =

American author and editor

- Born: c. 1966 (age: 59); New York, United States
- Occupation: Writer/editor
- Writing career
- Period: 2001–present
- Website: www.edmundrschubert.com

Edmund R. Schubert (born c. 1980) is an American author and editor best known for his work in the fields of science fiction and fantasy, though some of his short stories are mysteries, including one that was a preliminary nominee for an Edgar Award in 2006 for Best Short Story. In 2015, he was nominated for the Hugo Award for Best Editor (Short Form) but subsequently withdrew himself from consideration due to the block voting tactics which had been used to shape the ballot, stating that "I can't in good conscience complain about the deck being stacked against me, and then feel good about being nominated for an award when the deck gets stacked in my favor. That would make me a hypocrite." He has also written for and edited several business magazines.

== Fiction writing/editing ==
As a fiction author, Schubert has published nearly 50 short stories and one novel (Dreaming Creek, LBF Books, Oct. 2008). About half of his short stories are collected in The Trouble With Eating Clouds: A Collection of Mysteries, Magic, and Madness (Spotlight Publishing, June 2011). Schubert's stories cover a variety of genres, appearing in magazines and anthologies in the U.S., Canada, and Great Britain. His short fiction has been: included on storySouth's Year's Notable list; reprinted in The Writer's Post Journal's Year's Best issue; a #1 rated story on Zoetrope.com; a preliminary nominee for an Edgar Award from the Mystery Writers of America for Best Short Story; and First Prize Winner in Lynx Eye's Captivating Beginnings contest.

From 2006 - 2016 he was the editor of the online magazine publishing science fiction and fantasy, Orson Scott Card's InterGalactic Medicine Show, also co-editing with Orson Scott Card an IGMS anthology (Tor Books, Aug. 2008). A second IGMS anthology, the InterGalactic Medicine Show Awards Anthology, was published by Spotlight in Jan. of 2012, and a third in Dec. of 2013 by Hatrack Publishing. Schubert is also editor of and contributor to a non-fiction book about the business and craft of writing: How To Write Magical Words: A Writer's Companion (Bella Rosa Books, January, 2011).

Stories edited by Schubert for IGMS have appeared in various Year's Best anthologies, been nominated for several national awards, and won the WSFA Small Press Award for Best Short Story in 2009 and again in 2014. Although he withdrew from being a Hugo Award Finalist himself, one of the stories published in IGMS was a Finalist for the Hugo in the category of Best Novelette (as a result of the same ballot manipulation).

Schubert is a regular speaker at SF conventions in the southeastern United States, appearing on panels and teaching workshops. From June 2010 to March 2012, he was a regular blogger at MagicalWords.net (a writing blog designed to help newer writers, founded by authors Faith Hunter, David B. Coe, and Misty Massey), which was the basis for the How To Write Magical Words book. He has taught writing workshops at UNC-Greensboro in Greensboro, North Carolina, for the North Carolina Writer's Network Conference, and at Southern Virginia University in Buena Vista, VA. In 2019, Schubert served as both a fiction editor and a non-fiction editor for the online literary journal South 85. He also served as celebrity guest judge for the short story contest at the 2019 Hampton Roads Writer's Conference.

== Business writing/editing ==
In the area of business writing, Schubert was executive editor of the regional business magazine, North Carolina Career Network Magazine from 2005 to 2007, and managing editor of the nationally distributed Diversity Woman from 2007 to 2010. In those capacities he has interviewed and written about a wide variety of people, ranging from Jeff Kane, Officer in Charge of the Charlotte, NC branch of the Federal Reserve, to African-America icon Maya Angelou.

== Partial bibliography ==
Books

- Futures Mystery Anthology, Twilight Publishing, May 2006 (anthology, contributor: "Good With Directions")
- Tales From The Asylum: Year 3, From The Asylum Press, 2006 (anthology, contributor: "About Time")
- Crypto-Critters II, Padwolf Publishing, 2007 (anthology, contributor: "Lair of the Ice Rat")
- Beauty & Dynamite, Apex Publications, June 2008 (anthology, contributor: "Edmund Schubert says...")
- InterGalactic Medicine Show, Tor, Aug. 2008 (anthology, co-editor)
- Dreaming Creek, Lachesis/LBF Books, Oct. 2008 (novel, author)
- How To Write Magical Words: A Writer's Companion, Bella Rosa Books, Jan. 2011 (non-fiction anthology, editor, contributor: (multiple essays))
- The Trouble With Eating Clouds: A Collection of Mysteries, Magic, and Madness, Spotlight Publishing, June 2011 (short story collection, author)
- InterGalactic Medicine Show Awards Anthology, Vol. I, Spotlight Publishing, Jan. 2012 (anthology, co-editor, contributor)
- Writers for Relief: Vol. 3, Oct. 2013 (anthology, contributor: "Mean-Spirited")
- IGMS: Big Book of SF Novelettes, Hatrack Publishing, Dec. 2013 (anthology, co-editor)
- Big Bad II, Dark Oak Press, Feb. 2015 (anthology, contributor: "Feels Like Justice to Me")
- Temporally Out of Order, Zombies Need Brains Press, August 2015 (anthology, contributor: "Batting Out of Order"); reprinted in The Hardball Times, Spring 2018
- This Giant Leap, Falstaff Books, June 2016 (short story collection, author)
- Lawless Lands, Falstaff Books, June 2017 (anthology, contributor: "Calliope Stark: Bone Tree Bounty Hunter")
- Temporally Deactivated, Zombies Need Brains Press, June 2019 (anthology, contributor: "Schrodinger's Fractal")
