= ConCarolinas =

Science fiction convention in California

Coordinates: 35.3089°N 80.7507°W

- Cee Cee, the ConCarolinas Winged Panther. Art by Robert Snare
- Status: Active
- Genre: Science fiction
- Venue: Hilton Charlotte University Place
- Locations: Charlotte, North Carolina
- Country: United States
- Inaugurated: 2002
- Attendance: 1000-1300
- Organizer: ConCarolinas, Inc.
- Website: http://www.concarolinas.org/

ConCarolinas is a three-day-long science fiction convention held once each year in Charlotte, North Carolina, hosted by ConCarolinas, Inc., a non-profit corporation.

It hosts a variety of fandom related events and functions. Guests generally include a variety of authors, artists, costumers and media celebrities. Group guests generally include SG-Operations, the 501st Stormtroopers, KAG (Klingon Assault Group), and Society for Creative Anachronism. Games (LARPs, role-playing games, etc.) are also featured.

== History ==
2000-2001: The Genesis - After failing to get WorldCon to come to Charlotte, a group of individuals headed up by Irv Koch, Kelly Lockhart, and Sheldon Drum calling themselves the South East Convention Fandom, Inc. (SECFI), rallied support for a general science fiction convention in Charlotte. SECFI called upon experience from Cons like StellarCon, MACE, Roc of Ages, Babtrek and many more. Most of these people eventually became the first ConCom of ConCarolinas, with Fred Grimm as the Chairman and Ron McClung as Vice Chairman. At this time, the winged panther was chosen for a mascot.

ConCarolinas: The Prequel: May 2002- with Con Chair: Fred Grimm and Vice Chair Ron McClung, ConCarolinas started as a two-day event. The guest list was small and consisted mostly of local writers and artists such as Jeanne Foguth, dgk goldberg, Keith Bailey, and Gary Griffin. Events at this Con were meant to be teasers for what was to come in 2003, including primarily gaming - RPGs, RPGA, board games and card games.

ConCarolinas 2003: May 30 – June 1. (Con Chair: Ron McClung, Vice Chair: Matt Holmquist) - The First 3-day ConCarolinas featured David Weber as their first Writer Guest of Honor, plus Karen Taylor as a Featured Writer Guest. Other guests included d.g.k. goldberg, Stephen Euin Cobb, Mary M Buckner, Elaine Corvidae, and Andy Duncan. Programming was expanded to have 3 rooms of panels all weekend. The Rocky Horror Picture Show by F5 Productions joined ConCarolinas for the first time. Several outdoor SCA events were planned as well as a wide range of literary and fandom panels.

ConCarolinas 2004: June 4–6: (Con Chair: Ron McClung, Vice Chair: Matt Holmquist) - CC2004 had Writer Guest of Honor Alan Dean Foster and Artist Guest of Honor Joe Corroney. David Weber returned as Special Guest and other guests included author Davey Beauchamp, Walter H. Hunt, Tee Morris and Tony Ruggiero.

ConCarolinas 2005: June 3–5 (Con Chair: Ron McClung, Vice Chair: Jonathan Wilson) - CC2005 featured media guests for the first time in the con history. Ken Foree (Dawn of the Dead, Devil's Rejects), David Franklin (Farscape), Kane Hodder (Friday the 13th) and Bill Blair (Star Trek, Babylon 5) were the media guests at CC2005. Writer Guest of Honor was Greg Keyes. David Weber returned and was joined by his friend and co-writer John Ringo.

ConCarolinas 2006: June 2–4 (Con Chair: Ron McClung, Vice Chair: David Laws) - CC2006's Writer Guests of Honor was Spider Robinson and his wife, Jeanne, and Media Guest of Honor was Tony Amendola (Master Bra'Tac of Stargate SG-1). Gaming Guest of Honor was Peter Schweighofer. They also included more filking with music special guests Boogie Knights.

ConCarolinas 2007: June 1–3 (Con Chair: Tony Lone Fight, Vice Chair: Frank Parker) - Guests included Writer Guest of Honor Barbara Hambly, Writer Special Guest Robert Buettner, as well as Media Guest of Honor Bodie Olmos (Battlestar Galactica). Kelly Lockhart of Southern Fandom Resource Guide as their Fan Guest of Honor, the Geek Comedy Tour, and the Pirate Ball hosted by the Buccaneers of the Atlantic Coast.

ConCarolinas 2008: May 30 - June 1 (Con Chair: Frank Parker, Vice Chair: Ron McClung) - Guests included Gary Jones from Stargate SG-1 and Suzie Plakson, as well as Mike Resnick as our Literary Guest of Honor. Faith Hunter and David B. Coe were their literary special guests. Programming expanded with Paranormal tracks, and a Zombie Walk. Other guests included James Maxey, Mike Pederson, Edmund R. Schubert, Amy H. Sturgis, Ph.D., Robert V Aldrich, Gail Z. Martin, Steve Cross, and Stuart Jaffe, along with veterans Stephen Euin Cobb, and Davey Beauchamp.

ConCarolinas 2009: May 29–31 (Con Chair: Frank Parker, Vice Chair: Ron McClung) - Literary Guest of Honor Katherine Kurtz, Artist Guest of Honor Alan Welch. Additional Author guests included: Tony Ruggiero, Michael J. Sullivan, David B. Coe, Faith Hunter, Edmund R. Schubert

From 2002 until 2008, ConCarolinas was held at the Marriott Executive Park Hotel in Charlotte, NC. In 2009, the convention moved to the Hilton Charlotte University Place. In 2008, ConCarolinas won its bid for the 2010 DeepSouthCon and hosted it June 4–6, 2010, out of their new hotel.

ConCarolinas 2010: (Con Chair: Ron McClung, Vice Chair: Frank Parker) held at the Charlotte Hilton University Place. ConCarolinas hosted DeepSouthCon and awarded the Phoenix Award to Author GOH, Jerry Pournelle, and the Rebel Award to Fan GOH and Founder of the 501st Legion, Albin Johnson. Other guests included Ed Beard, Bill and Brenda Sutton.

ConCarolinas continues as an annual convention with events held June 3–5, 2011, June 1–3, 2012, May 31-June 2, 2013. May 30 through June 1, 2014, and May 29–31, 2015.

The next ConCarolinas is scheduled to be held June 2 - 4, 2023.
