= Ursula Vernon =

American comic creator and writer (born 1977)

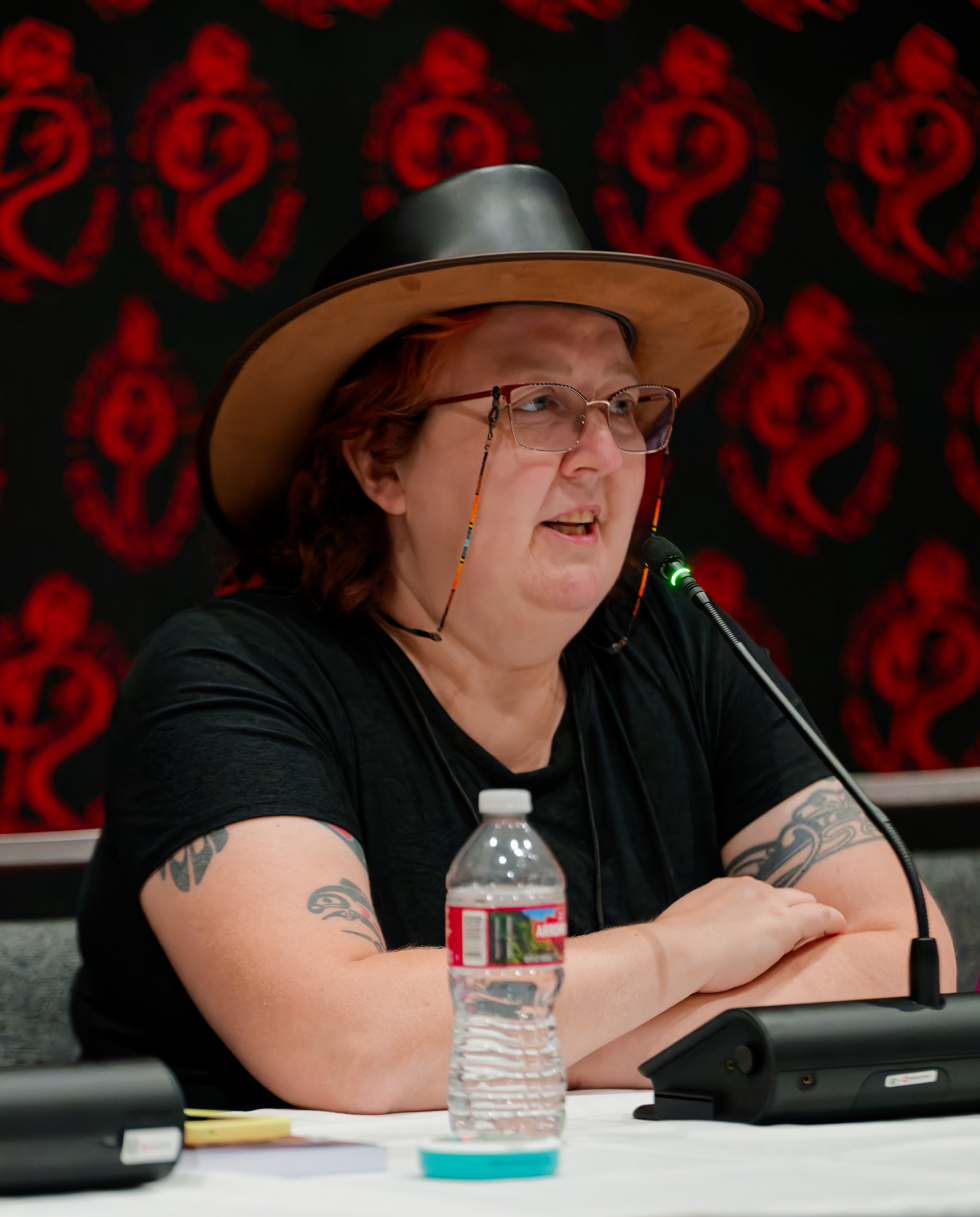
- Vernon in 2025
- Born: Ursula Vernon; May 28, 1977 (age 49) Japan
- Areas: Writer, artist, webcomics creator
- Pseudonym: T. Kingfisher
- Notable works: Digger, Dragonbreath series, Nettle & Bone
- Awards: Ursa Major Award, Hugo Award, Nebula Award, Mythopoeic Award, WSFA Small Press Award, Locus Award

Ursula Vernon (born May 28, 1977) is an American writer, artist, and illustrator. She has won numerous awards for her work in various mediums, including Hugo Awards for her graphic novel Digger, fantasy novel Nettle & Bone, and fantasy novella Thornhedge; the Nebula Award for her short story "Jackalope Wives"; and Mythopoeic Awards for adult and children's literature. Vernon's books for children include Hamster Princess and Dragonbreath. Under the name T. Kingfisher, she is also the author of books for older audiences. She writes short fiction under both names.

== Life and career ==
Ursula Vernon was born in Japan to a military family and grew up in Oregon and Arizona. She studied anthropology at Macalester College in Saint Paul, Minnesota, where she first took art classes.

Vernon hosting the Hugo Award ceremony at 2026 Worldcon

She first became known for her webcomics and as a freelance artist, particularly for her works containing anthropomorphic animals. She then moved into writing and illustrating children's books, her first being published in 2008, and then books for adults under the pseudonym T. Kingfisher. She started using the pseudonym in order to avoid confusion for parents who were only familiar with her as a children's book author. She chose it both because she loves kingfishers and as an homage to Ursula K. Le Guin, who once joked that the initials "U.K." could stand for "Ulysses Kingfisher". Vernon has published short fiction under both names, and has won a number of awards for them including the Hugo Award and Nebula Award.

She regularly attends conventions to exhibit and sell her work. She was a guest of honor at Midwest FurFest 2004 and 2009, and the Artist Guest of Honor at Further Confusion 2010. In August 2014, Vernon was the Author Guest of Honor for Mythcon 45 and a Guest of Honor at Eurofurence 20. She was the Author Guest of Honor at Arisia 2017.

The game Black Sheep designed by Reiner Knizia and published by Fantasy Flight Games uses art by Vernon on its playing cards. Her artwork titled The Biting Pear of Salamanca became an internet meme in the form of the "LOL WUT pear".

In June 2023, Vernon announced she had been diagnosed with breast cancer; by December of that year, she announced that her treatment had been successful and she was cancer-free.

== Works ==
=== Books for younger audiences ===
All of the following books for younger readers are written under the name Ursula Vernon.

==== Dragonbreath series ====
- Dragonbreath. Dial Books. June 11, 2009. ISBN 978-0-8037-3363-3.
- Dragonbreath: Attack of the Ninja Frogs. Dial Books. January 1, 2010. ISBN 978-0-8037-3365-7.
- Dragonbreath: Curse of the Were-Weiner. Dial Books. September 16, 2010. ISBN 978-0-8037-3469-2.
- Dragonbreath: Lair of the Bat Monster. Dial Books. March 17, 2011. ISBN 978-0-8037-3525-5.
- Dragonbreath: No Such Thing as Ghosts. Dial Books. July 11, 2011. ISBN 978-0-8037-3527-9.
- Dragonbreath: Revenge of the Horned Bunnies. Dial Books. January 10, 2012. ISBN 978-0-8037-3677-1.
- Dragonbreath: When Fairies Go Bad. Dial Books. September 13, 2012. ISBN 978-0-8037-3678-8.
- Dragonbreath: Nightmare of the Iguana. Dial Books. January 29, 2013. ISBN 978-0-8037-3846-1.
- Dragonbreath: The Case of the Toxic Mutants. Dial Books. August 29, 2013. ISBN 978-0-8037-3847-8.
- Dragonbreath: Knight-napped!. Dial Books. January 6, 2015. ISBN 978-0-8037-3849-2.
- Dragonbreath: The Frozen Menace. Dial Books. January 12, 2016. ISBN 978-0-8037-3986-4.

==== Hamster Princess series ====
- Hamster Princess: Harriet the Invincible. Dial Books. August 18, 2015. ISBN 978-0-8037-3983-3.
- Hamster Princess: Of Mice and Magic. Dial Books. March 15, 2016. ISBN 978-0-8037-3984-0.
- Hamster Princess: Ratpunzel. Dial Books. October 18, 2016. ISBN 978-0-8037-3985-7.
- Hamster Princess: Giant Trouble. Dial Books. May 9, 2017. ISBN 978-0-399-18652-3.
- Hamster Princess: Whiskerella. Dial Books. January 23, 2018. ISBN 978-0-399-18655-4.
- Hamster Princess: Little Red Rodent Hood. Dial Books. September 25, 2018. ISBN 978-0-399-18658-5.

==== Other children's books ====
- Nurk: The Strange Surprising Adventures Of A (Somewhat) Brave Shrew. Clarion Books. June 1, 2008. ISBN 978-0-15-206375-7.
- Castle Hangnail. Dial Books. April 21, 2015. ISBN 978-0-8037-4129-4.)

=== Adult books ===
Unless noted otherwise, these books are written under the name T. Kingfisher.

==== Black Dogs (as Ursula Vernon) ====
- Black Dogs Part 1: The House of Diamond. Sofawolf Press. March 1, 2007. ISBN 978-0-9769212-4-0.
- Black Dogs Part 2: The Mountain of Iron. Sofawolf Press. January 1, 2011. ISBN 978-1-936689-03-3.

==== World of the White Rat ====
- Clockwork Boys. Clocktaur War #1. Red Wombat Tea Company. November 21, 2017. ISBN 978-1-61450-406-1.
- The Wonder Engine. Clocktaur War #2. Red Wombat Tea Company. February 27, 2018. ISBN 978-1-61450-417-7.
- Swordheart. Swordheart #1. Argyll Productions. November 27, 2018. ISBN 978-1-61450-463-4.
- Daggerbound. Swordheart #2. Tor Bramble. August 25, 2026. ISBN 978-1-250-40008-6.
- Paladin's Grace. The Saint of Steel #1. Red Wombat Studio. February 11, 2020. ISBN 978-1-61450-521-1.
- Paladin's Strength. The Saint of Steel #2. Red Wombat Studio. February 28, 2021. ISBN 978-1-61450-530-3.
- Paladin's Hope. The Saint of Steel #3. Red Wombat Studio. October 9, 2021. ISBN 978-1-61450-551-8.
- Paladin's Faith. The Saint of Steel #4. Red Wombat Studio. December 5, 2023. ISBN 978-1-61450-609-6.

==== The Sworn Soldier series ====
- What Moves The Dead. Tor Nightfire. July 12, 2022. ISBN 978-1-250-83075-3.
- What Feasts at Night. Tor Nightfire. February 13, 2024. ISBN 978-1-250-83085-2.
- What Stalks the Deep. Tor Nightfire. September 30, 2025. ISBN 978-1-250-35492-1.

==== Collections ====
As Ursula Vernon:

- It Made Sense at the Time: Selected Sketches. Sofawolf Press. November 18, 2004. ISBN 978-0-9712670-6-0.

As T. Kingfisher:

- Toad Words and Other Stories. Red Wombat Tea Company. August 4, 2014. ISBN 9781501413179.
- The Halcyon Fairy Book. NESFA Press. January 19, 2017. ISBN 9781610373265. (Note: Includes Toad Words and Other Stories as well as essays on traditional fairy tales)
- Jackalope Wives and Other Stories. Argyll Productions. September 12, 2017. ISBN 9781614504030.

==== Media tie-ins ====
- Baldur's Gate 3: Astarion. Baldur's Gate. Random House Worlds. September 29, 2026. ISBN 9798217298594.

==== Standalone novels ====
- Nine Goblins. Red Wombat Tea Company. October 27, 2013. ISBN 978-1-310-50576-8.
- The Seventh Bride. Red Wombat Tea Company. November 11, 2014. ISBN 978-1-5039-4975-1.
- Bryony & Roses. Red Wombat Tea Company. May 18, 2015. ISBN 978-1-61450-399-6.
- The Raven & The Reindeer. Red Wombat Tea Company. February 7, 2016. ISBN 978-1-61450-389-7.
- Summer in Orcus. Red Wombat Tea Company. September 2016. ISBN 978-1-936689-60-6.
- Minor Mage. Argyll Productions. July 29, 2019. ISBN 978-1-61450-500-6.
- The Twisted Ones. Simon & Schuster. October 1, 2019. ISBN 978-1-5344-2957-4.
- A Wizard's Guide to Defensive Baking. Argyll Productions. July 21, 2020. ISBN 978-1-61450-524-2.
- The Hollow Places. Simon & Schuster. October 6, 2020. ISBN 978-1-5344-5112-4.
- Nettle & Bone. Tor Books. April 26, 2022. ISBN 978-1-250-24404-8.
- Illuminations. Argyll Productions. November 25, 2022. ISBN 978-1-61450-577-8.
- A House with Good Bones. Tor Nightfire. March 28, 2023. ISBN 978-1-250-82979-5.
- Thornhedge. Tor Books. August 15, 2023. ISBN 978-1-250-24409-3.
- A Sorceress Comes to Call. Tor Books. August 6, 2024. ISBN 978-1-250-24407-9.
- Hemlock & Silver. Tor Books. August 19, 2025. ISBN 978-1-250-34203-4.
- Snake-Eater. 47North. December 1, 2025. ISBN 978-1-6625-2509-4.
- Wolf Worm. Tor Nightfire. March 24, 2026. ISBN 978-1-250-82982-5.

=== Webcomics ===
- Digger
  - Vol. 1 (ISBN 978-0-9769212-2-6)
  - Vol. 2 (ISBN 978-0-9769212-6-4)
  - Vol. 3 (ISBN 978-0-9791496-3-4)
  - Vol. 4 (ISBN 978-0-9819883-3-7)
  - Vol. 5 (ISBN 978-0-9819883-9-9)
  - Vol. 6 (ISBN 978-1-936689-06-4)
  - Digger: The Complete Omnibus Edition (ISBN 978-1-936689-32-3)
- Irrational Fears
- "Little Creature"
  - "Little Creature and the Redcap"

== Awards and nominations ==
Year	Work	Award	Category	Result	Ref.
2005	Digger	Web Cartoonists' Choice Award	Outstanding Anthropomorphic Comic	Finalist	
2005	Digger	Web Cartoonists' Choice Award	Outstanding Black and White Art	Won	
2006	Digger	Eisner Award	Talent Deserving of Wider Recognition	Finalist	
2007	Digger	Web Cartoonists' Choice Award	Outstanding Anthropomorphic Comic	Finalist	
2012	Digger	Hugo Award	Graphic Story	Won	
2013	Digger	Mythopoeic Award	Adult Literature	Won	
2014	"Jackalope Wives"	Nebula Award	Short Story	Won	
2015	"Jackalope Wives"	World Fantasy Award	Short Fiction	Finalist	
2015	"Jackalope Wives"	WSFA Small Press Award	—	Won	
2016	Castle Hangnail	Mythopoeic Award	Children's Literature	Won	
2016	"Pocosin"	Eugie Award	—	Finalist	
2017	"The Tomato Thief"	Hugo Award	Novelette	Won	
2017	"The Tomato Thief"	WSFA Small Press Award	—	Won	
2018	Summer in Orcus	Lodestar Award for Best Young Adult Book	—	Finalist	
2018	"Sun, Moon, Dust"	Hugo Award	Short Story	Finalist	
2019	"The Rose MacGregor Drinking and Admiration Society"	Hugo Award	Short Story	Finalist	
2020	"Fisher-Bird"	Locus Award	Short Story	Finalist	
2020	Minor Mage	Lodestar Award for Best Young Adult Book	—	Finalist	
2020	The Twisted Ones	British Fantasy Award	Horror Novel	Shortlisted	
2020	The Twisted Ones	Dragon Award	Horror Novel	Won	
2020	The Twisted Ones	Locus Award	Horror Novel	Finalist	
2020	The Twisted Ones	RUSA Reading List	Horror	Won	
2020	A Wizard's Guide to Defensive Baking	Andre Norton Award	—	Won	
2021	The Hollow Places	British Fantasy Award	Horror Novel	Shortlisted	
2021	The Hollow Places	Dragon Award	Horror Novel	Won	
2021	The Hollow Places	Locus Award	Horror Novel	Finalist	
2021	The Hollow Places	RUSA Reading List	Horror	Shortlisted	
2021	"Metal Like Blood in the Dark"	Hugo Award	Short Story	Won	
2021	"Metal Like Blood in the Dark"	WSFA Small Press Award	—	Won	
2021	A Wizard's Guide to Defensive Baking	Dragon Award	Young Adult / Middle Grade Novel	Won	
2021	A Wizard's Guide to Defensive Baking	Locus Award	Young Adult Book	Won	
2021	A Wizard's Guide to Defensive Baking	Lodestar Award for Best Young Adult Book	—	Won	
2021	A Wizard's Guide to Defensive Baking	Mythopoeic Award	Children's Literature	Won	
2022	Illuminations	BSFA Award	Book for Younger Readers	Shortlisted	
2022	Nettle & Bone	Dragon Award	Fantasy Novel	Finalist	
2022	Nettle & Bone	Nebula Award	Novel	Finalist	
2022	Paladin's Strength	Locus Award	Fantasy Novel	Finalist	
2022	What Moves the Dead	Goodreads Choice Awards	Horror	Finalist	
2022	The World of the White Rat	Hugo Award	Series	Finalist	
2023	A House with Good Bones	Dragon Award	Horror Novel	Won	
2023	Nettle & Bone	Hugo Award	Novel	Won	
2023	Nettle & Bone	Locus Award	Fantasy Novel	Finalist	
2023	Nettle & Bone	RUSA Reading List	Fantasy	Won	
2023	Thornhedge	Nebula Award	Novella	Finalist	
2023	What Moves the Dead	Hugo Award	Novella	Finalist	
2023	What Moves the Dead	Locus Award	Horror Novel	Won	
2023	What Moves the Dead	RUSA Reading List	Horror	Shortlisted	
2024	A House with Good Bones	British Fantasy Award	Horror Novel	Shortlisted	
2024	A House with Good Bones	Locus Award	Horror Novel	Won	
2024	Paladin's Faith	Locus Award	Fantasy Novel	Finalist	
2024	A Sorceress Comes to Call	Nebula Award	Novel	Finalist	
2024	Thornhedge	British Fantasy Award	Best Novella	Shortlisted	
2024	Thornhedge	Hugo Award	Novella	Won	
2024	Thornhedge	Locus Award	Novella	Won	
2024	Thornhedge	RUSA Reading List	Fantasy	Shortlisted	
2024	Thornhedge	World Fantasy Award	Novella	Finalist	
2024	What Feasts at Night	Goodreads Choice Awards	Horror	Finalist	
2025	A Sorceress Comes to Call	Hugo Award	Novel	Finalist	
2025	A Sorceress Comes to Call	Locus Award	Fantasy Novel	Won	
2025	A Sorceress Comes to Call	RUSA Reading List	Fantasy	Shortlisted	
2025	What Feasts at Night	British Fantasy Award	Best Novella	Shortlisted	
2025	What Feasts at Night	Hugo Award	Novella	Finalist	
2025	What Feasts at Night	Locus Award	Novella	Won	
2026	Hemlock & Silver	Locus Award	Fantasy Novel	Finalist	
2026	Hemlock & Silver	Dragon Awards	Illustrative Book Cover	Won	
2026	Snake-Eater	Mythopoeic Award	Adult Literature	Won	
2026	What Stalks the Deep	Hugo Award	Novella	Finalist	
2026	What Stalks the Deep	Locus Award	Novella	Finalist	
2026	What Feasts at Night	Premio Ignotus	Foreign Novel	Won	
