= Jackalope Wives =

Short story by Ursula Vernon

"Jackalope Wives" is a 2014 fantasy short story by Ursula Vernon, combining the legends of the swan maiden and the jackalope. It was first published in Apex Magazine and has been reprinted in the collection Jackalope Wives and Other Stories. One of the characters, Grandma Harken, is the protagonist of another award-winning story by Vernon, "The Tomato Thief."

== Synopsis ==
When a young man accidentally mutilates a jackalope wife, his Grandma Harken takes charge of her.

== Reception ==
"Jackalope Wives" won the 2014 Nebula Award for Best Short Story, and the 2015 WSFA Small Press Award, and was nominated for the 2015 World Fantasy Award—Short Fiction. As well, an analysis at Io9 indicated that, if not for the Sad Puppies ballot-manipulation campaign, "Jackalope Wives" would have been a finalist for the 2015 Hugo Award for Best Short Story.

Tor.com called it "soulful" and "extraordinary", praising Grandma Harken as a "captivating protagonist". At Locus, Lois Tilton commended Vernon's "(f)ine prose imagery and dialogue, strong characters, (and) neat invented folklore". Strange Horizons noted that, by basing the story on "a piece of inauthentic kitsch", Vernon avoided issues of cultural appropriation.
