= Karina Sumner-Smith =

Canadian author

Karina Sumner-Smith is a Toronto-based fantasy author. Her short fiction appears in magazines such as Strange Horizons, Lady Churchill's Rosebud Wristlet, and Fantasy, as well as various anthologies. She is a graduate of both York University and the Clarion Writers Workshop (2001).

== Novels ==
=== The Towers Trilogy ===
- Radiant (2014)
- Defiant (2015)
- Towers Fall (2015)

== Awards ==
Her story "An End to All Things" was a finalist for the 2006 Nebula Award. Her story "The Oracle and the Warlord" was a finalist for the 2018 WSFA Small Press Award.
