= What Feasts at Night =

2024 horror novella by T. Kingfisher

- Author: T. Kingfisher
- Audio read by: Avi Roque
- Cover artist: Christina Mrozik
- Language: English
- Series: Sworn Soldier #2
- Genre: Horror, gothic fiction
- Set in: Gallacia (a fictional country)
- Publisher: Tor Nightfire
- Publication date: February 13, 2024
- Publication place: United States
- Pages: 160 pp. (hardcover 1st ed.)
- ISBN: 9781250830852 (hardcover 1st ed.)
- OCLC: 2023037945
- Dewey Decimal: 813/.6
- LC Class: PS3611.I597 W43 2024
- Preceded by: What Moves the Dead
- Followed by: What Stalks the Deep

What Feasts at Night is a 2024 horror novel by American author Ursula Vernon, writing under the pen name T. Kingfisher. The novel is a standalone sequel to the 2022 novella What Moves the Dead.

== Plot ==
Alex Easton returns to kan (Note: The fictional Gallacian language contains seven sets of personal pronouns. This includes a set of pronouns specifically for soldiers, regardless of their sex assigned at birth.) family hunting lodge in Gallacia. Ka is accompanied by kan batman Angus and English mycologist Eugenia Potter. The caretaker Codrin has died. Codrin's daughter claims that the man died of lung inflammation; some villagers say he was killed by a moroi, a creature that steals the breath of its victims by sitting on their chests. The moroi may take the form of a moth or of a beautiful woman.

Angus hires the widow Botezatu and her grandson Bors to replace Codrin. Easton has a dream that a moroi is suffocating kan, and shortly afterwards Bors takes ill with a lung condition. The widow believes that the moroi has attacked him. The moroi is the spirit of a dead woman buried in the lodge's spring house, which has recently run dry. Easton moves a stone, which causes the water to flow again. Unfortunately, ka does this at night, accidentally trapping the moroi outside and preventing her from returning to her body. That night, the moroi attacks Easton.

Easton becomes trapped in a dream. Ka speaks with Bors, who is also trapped. They see Botezatu, who offers herself and Easton to the moroi in exchange for Bors. The moroi attacks Botezatu, but Easton tackles her. The dream world changes to Easton's time during the war. Ka uses kan service revolver to kill the moroi in the dream world.

Ka awakens four days later; Angus and Eugenia are treating ka for pneumonia. Easton was found half-submerged in the springhouse. They dig up the moroi's corpse from inside the springhouse and she is buried in the local churchyard. Easton, Angus, and Eugenia return to their normal lives, and Bors remains behind as the new caretaker.

== Reception ==
Publishers Weekly wrote that "Kingfisher's winning formula of creepy folklore, affable protagonists, familiar Gothic tropes, and truly unsettling horror imagery makes this sing."

Julia Glassman of The Mary Sue rated the novella 5/5. Glassman stated that in the first novella, "Easton is mostly a spectator to the horrific goings-on." Easton plays a more active role in What Feasts at Night. Glassman wrote that the moroi "forces Easton to relive their days as a soldier, and the story becomes a double haunting: the literal ghost feeding on Easton, and Easton's wartime memories." The review praised Easton's character, calling them "a nonbinary war vet with PTSD, a dry wit, and a big heart." Fiona Denton of Grimdark Magazine also praised the novella, writing that the "writing is witty, the characters superb, and the tale will keep you gripped from cover to cover." Denton praised the characters, particularly the "camaraderie between Easton and Angus."

== Awards ==
Year	Award	Category	Result	Ref.
2024	Goodreads Choice Awards	Horror	Finalist	
2025	British Fantasy Award	Best Novella	Shortlisted	
2025	Hugo Award	Best Novella	Finalist	
2025	Locus Award	Best Novella	Won	
2026	Premio Ignotus	Best Foreign Novel	Won	
