= Hemlock & Silver =

2025 fantasy novel by T. Kingfisher

- Author: T. Kingfisher
- Language: English
- Genre: Fantasy
- Publisher: Tor Books
- Publication date: 19 August 2025
- Publication place: United States
- Pages: 368 (Hardcover)
- ISBN: 9781250342034

Hemlock & Silver is a 2025 fantasy novel by Ursula Vernon, writing under the pen name T. Kingfisher. The story is an original fantasy story that incorporates motifs from Snow White.

== Plot ==
The king visits a healer named Anja and informs her that he has murdered his wife. The queen was cutting out the heart of their daughter Rose, who also died. He suspects that his surviving daughter Snow is being poisoned; he requests Anja's assistance.

Anja and her guard Javier arrive at Witherleaf, where she meets Snow. Anja investigates Snow's food, cosmetics, and belongings, but finds no trace of poison. One night, Anja sees a flash of movement in the bedroom mirror. She jumps out of bed but finds that her room is empty.

Anja interviews Snow's nurse. She learns that Rose began to experience symptoms of memory loss prior to her death. Anja observes Snow eating a silver apple from the courtyard garden. She takes the apple, angering Snow. The apple tests negative for poisons, but Anja remains suspicious. She decides to eat a slice herself. She composes a letter to the king detailing her findings. The letter is stolen by Snow's cat. While chasing the cat, Anja trips and falls into her mirror.

Snow's cat, Grayling, reveals that he can talk. He explains some of the rules of the mirror world. Anja begins experimenting with the mirror. She brings a mirrored book into the real world; it quickly crumbles into dust. Several hours later, she begins to vomit; she realizes that the mirrored apple has made her ill. She concludes that Snow is poisoning herself.

Javier sees Anja stepping out of the mirror. She brings him into the mirror world. Anja realizes that the figure she saw in her bedroom was Snow, who has been visiting the mirror world. Anja confronts Snow, who reveals that she is being blackmailed into eating the mirror-apples by an unnamed woman. Snow believes that Rose is still alive.

Someone throws Anja through a mirror, trapping her in the mirror word. She is captured by mirrored guards and brought before the Queen. The Mirror Queen tells them that the original Queen once cut herself, and the blood on the mirror caused her reflection to awaken. The Mirror Queen wants to become real. She initially used Rose to try to bring herself into the real world; she is now using Snow instead.

The mirrored guards capture Javier and Anja. Grayling helps them escape. Anja learns that, in order for a reflection to become real, they must kill the original and eat their heart. Javier and Anja encounter a mirror-geld, a creature created from fragmented reflections of body parts. The creature helps them return to the real world. Anja confronts Snow. Snow admits to helping the Mirror Queen, who promised her that she would return Rose in exchange for Snow's help. Anja breaks the news that Rose is truly dead.

Snow vows to avenge her sister and kill the Mirror Queen. She eats five apples, which will sicken her but give her enough strength to push the Mirror Queen into the real world. With the help of a mirror-geld, Anja and Javier confront the Queen. The Queen holds Snow at knifepoint. Anja and the mirror-geld trap the Queen between two hand mirrors, splitting her into pieces. With Grayling's help, Snow pushes the broken Queen into the real world, where she crumbles to dust.

Anja reverses the effects of the poisonous apples with snake venom. Snow recovers. Anja and Javier begin a relationship. Anja says farewell to Grayling before planning her return to her hometown.

== Style ==
Gary K. Wolfe wrote that the book begins as a "forensic procedural mystery." Anja tests various rational hypotheses for Snow's illness. Supernatural elements do not appear until approximately the halfway point of the novel. Even when the story introduces magical elements, "Anja never abandons her analytical habits of observation and hypothesis-testing..."

== Reception and awards ==
Publishers Weekly gave the book a starred review, calling it an "utterly delightful Snow White riff." The review praised the combination of elements from dark fairy tales and a medical mystery. The review praised the Lovecraftian mirror-gelds as well as the charming sidekick of Grayling, concluding that "this is Kingfisher at her best."

Writing for Locus, Gary K. Wolfe compared the novel to Thornhedge, in which Kingfisher also adapted pieces of a fairy tale to create a new story. Wolfe stated that Kingfisher's style involves addressing fairy tales from a new point of view, as well as "introducing unexpected elements from completely different genres." Wolfe praised Kingfisher's combination of humor, romance, and horror elements, concluding that "Hemlock & Silver is another fine example of what her devoted horde of followers cherish in her work." Also writing for Locus, Adrienne Martini called the book "a love letter to the scientific method." Martini recommended the novel as a good starting point for readers unfamiliar with Kingfisher's works.

The novel was a finalist for the 2026 Locus Award for Best Fantasy Novel.
