= Nine Goblins =

2013 novella by T. Kingfisher

Nine Goblins: A Tale of Low Fantasy and High Mischief
- Cover art for the self-published edition of the novella
- Author: Ursula Vernon, writing as T. Kingfisher
- Language: English
- Published: 2013 (self-published); 20 Jan 2026 (Tordotcom)
- Publisher: Self-published (original); later published by Tordotcom
- Publication place: United States
- Pages: 160 (Tor hardcover)
- ISBN: 9781250400116

Nine Goblins: A Tale of Low Fantasy and High Mischief is a 2013 novella by Ursula Vernon, writing under the pen name T. Kingfisher. It is Vernon's first work published under the Kingfisher pseudonym. The novella was published in print format by Tordotcom in 2026.

== Plot ==
Goblins are currently at war against elves and humans. Nessilka is a sergeant in the Nineteenth Infantry of the goblin army. During a battle, Nessilka confronts an enemy wizard, who opens a portal. Nine members of the Nineteenth, as well as the wizard himself, fall into it. The goblins awaken to find themselves in a forest miles behind enemy lines. They leave the unconscious wizard behind. The goblins raid a farmhouse for supplies, where they discover that all of the humans and livestock have disappeared.

Meanwhile, Sings-to-Trees is an elvish veterinarian who rescues injured creatures, both mundane and magical. He is considered an oddity by other elves. Sings treats an injured cervidian, a creature that takes the form of a living deer skeleton. Cervidians are attracted to magical disturbances; Sing wonders what has brought them to his cabin.

Soon after, Sings encounters the goblins; they become friends despite the ongoing war. Nessilka tells Sings about the missing humans. Together, they leave the cabin to investigate. They hear a mysterious voice and are compelled to follow it, but a cervidian blocks their path. The voice stops, and the group realizes that they have almost fallen into a magical trap.

Nessilka and two other goblins fashion earplugs and set out in search of the voice's source. They follow a trail of bodies into the village, discovering that many villagers and domestic animals have died while rushing towards the voice. The source of the voice appears to be the village church. Nessilka enters the church, finding a young human girl preparing breakfast amongst the corpses.

The girl initially tries to convince Nessilka that she is a survivor, but the goblins do not believe her. The girl opens her mouth and reveals that she is the source of the voice. One of the goblins clubs the girl, knocking her unconscious. Elves arrive; they arrest the goblins on suspicion of committing the massacre.

A cervidian brings Sings-to-Trees to the wizard, who woke up after being left alone in the woods. The wizard, John, is originally from the village. Sings tells John about the voice; John states that the power belongs to his sister, Lisabet. John and Sings arrive in the village. Lisabet reveals that she killed everyone. Since Lisabet needed an adult caretaker, she believed that this act would ensure John was sent home from the war. John is horrified by her actions but does not want her to be arrested. He opens a portal, bringing himself and Lisabet to a remote location.

Nessilka is awarded a medal for service to the elven nation. The goblins plan to return home, hoping that their story will help lead to an end to the war.

== Publication history ==
The book was initially published in 2013 on Vernon's personal website. It became available in print for the first time in 2026.

== Reception and awards ==
Marlene Harris of Library Journal gave the book a starred review, wrote that the novella was an example of cozy fantasy before the subgenre became more popular. Harris wrote that the book offers "all the sly humor and thought-provoking writing that readers have come to expect from Kingfisher." She recommended it for fans of Grunts! by Mary Gentle and The Grey Bastards by Jonathan French.

Writing for Bookreporter, Ray Palen called the book "a delightful and ultimately serious allegory about war and tension between creatures of different races." Palen praised the novel's humor, concluding that it is "insightful and rewarding."

Gary K. Wolfe of Locus wrote that the "story holds up pretty well, even as it shows some evidence of an early effort." Some examples of the novella's less-sophisticated qualities include a tendency toward "gross-out humor" and "coyly cute names like Uggersplut and Gloober." Despite this, Wolfe felt that "the overall tone of the novella is both raucously funny and endearingly sweet." Wolfe further noted that the novella is not as complex as Kingfisher's later works, but that the novella is not trying to be a complex story. The reviewer concluded that the author's "narrative voice is as delightfully chatty as ever" and that "those who enjoy the playfulness and sharp wit of those [later] novels will not be disappointed."

Publishers Weekly noted the "uneven pacing" which marks the novella as one of Kingfisher's earlier works. Nevertheless, the review praised the "trademark humor" and stated that readers "will have fun delving into the archive."
