= A Sorceress Comes to Call =

2024 novel by T. Kingfisher

- Author: T. Kingfisher
- Language: English
- Genre: Fantasy
- Published: August 6, 2024
- Publication place: United States
- Pages: 336
- Awards: 2025 Locus Award for Best Fantasy Novel
- ISBN: 9781250244079

A Sorceress Comes to Call is a 2024 fantasy novel by Ursula Vernon, writing under the pen name T. Kingfisher. The novel won the 2025 Locus Award for Best Fantasy Novel. It was a finalist for the 2024 Nebula Award for Best Novel and the 2025 Hugo Award for Best Novel.

== Plot ==
Fourteen-year-old Cordelia is the daughter of a sorceress, Evangeline. Her mother is volatile; whenever Cordelia displeases Evangeline, the sorceress punishes her by making her “obedient”. This is a form of magic in which the sorceress takes control of Cordelia’s body and forces her to behave in certain ways. Cordelia takes solace in her horse Falada and her friend Ellen Parker. Unbeknownst to Cordelia, Falada is her mother’s familiar, and Evangeline is the mistress of Ellen’s father Mr. Parker.

Evangeline pretends to be a genteel widow and plans to marry a wealthy man, Squire Samuel Chatham. Evangeline contrives for Samuel to invite her and Cordelia to stay at the Chatham family manor while she begins to seduce him. Samuel’s sister Hester senses that something is amiss and vows to stop her brother from proposing marriage to Evangeline. She also notices that Cordelia is being abused by her mother and plans to rescue her. Samuel Chatham reads aloud from the newspaper that Mr. Parker has killed his family with an axe; Cordelia realizes that Evangeline forced him to do so.

Hester invites her former lover Richard Evermore, her friend Imogene Strauss, and Samuel’s former mistress Penelope Green to stay at the manor. She hopes that Penelope will drive a wedge between Samuel and Evangeline. Samuel is smitten with Penelope, which infuriates Evangeline. Evangeline deduces that Penelope is an untrained sorceress, further exacerbating their rivalry.

One evening, Hester hears screams coming from Penelope’s room. Hester, Richard, and Samuel arrive to find Penelope holding a bloody knife, standing over her maid’s dead body. Evangeline is already present. Penelope dies after falling over her balcony; witnesses assume she committed suicide, but she may have been pushed by a sorcerous wind.

Cordelia tells Hester the truth about her mother. Hester soon confides in Richard and Imogene. Richard leaves to interview Mr. Parker, which ascertains the veracity of Cordelia’s story. Meanwhile, Samuel and Evangeline are engaged. Hester, Richard, and Cordelia conspire to protect Samuel from his new fiancée. Despite the fact that Hester loves Richard, she asks him to propose to Cordelia. Two weddings are planned in close succession.

Penelope’s ghost contacts Cordelia. Samuel and Evangeline are married. The group travels to Evermore House, Richard’s family home. Evangeline and Samuel leave for their honeymoon. Cordelia and her conspirators search the Evermore library for a way to fight sorcery. They discover a ritual that may work to remove a sorcerer’s powers. They decide to test it on Falada. The ritual requires three reagents: water, wine, and salt. Hester and Imogene activate their water and salt, respectively. Richard does not have any magical affinity for wine; thus, the ritual fails.

Richard decapitates Falada and buries the body. The next morning, the group sees that Falada has risen from the grave. The headless horse attacks the manor, but is rebuffed. Knowing that Falada will not hurt her, Cordelia sneaks out of the manor. She mounts Falada and rides him away from the house. Falada brings Cordelia to Evangeline.

Evangeline makes Cordelia obedient and begins torturing her for information. They return to the Evermore manor. Evangeline orders Cordelia to stab Richard. Penelope’s ghost helps Cordelia fight off the controlling magic. Evangeline orders Hester to stab Richard instead. Evangeline tries to control too many people at once, and her magic slips. Hester knocks Evangeline unconscious. The group attempts the ritual once again, with Penelope’s ghost attuned to wine. The ritual is completed and Evangeline loses her magic. Penelope’s ghost moves on to the afterlife. Falada is freed from Evangeline’s control; he kills her before disappearing.

Cordelia goes to live with Hester and Richard. The novel ends as Cordelia visits Penelope’s grave.

== Background and style ==
The novel was inspired by the Brothers Grimm fairy tale "The Goose Girl". It takes inspiration from both regency romance novels and Gothic horror.

The novel has two narrators: Cordelia and Hester. According to Lacy Baugher Milas, "Cordelia’s voice is balanced by that of the sardonic Hester, a crotchety spinster with a bum knee who brings a mature, sensible spirit to the story and serves as a stoic balance to the timid, socially awkward younger girl who has never been allowed to imagine a life of her own."

== Reception and awards ==
In a starred review, Publishers Weekly wrote that Kingfisher "continues her hot streak of deeply compassionate, thrilling, and often laugh-out-loud fairy tale retellings." The review praised the novel for "expertly blending humor with folkloric horror," recommending it for Kingfisher fans and new readers alike. In a starred review, Marlene Harris of Library Journal praised Kingfisher for her subtle changes to traditional fairy tale elements. Harris wrote that this is a novel "where women play the parts that men traditionally filled, and men serve as helpmeets, sidekicks, and love interests." Harris highly recommended the novel for those who enjoy reimagined legends. Lacy Baugher Milas of Paste wrote that Kingfisher's novel "feels positively timeless in all the best possible ways, a feat which is admittedly no small act of magic in and of itself." Milas concludes that Kingfisher "once again refuses to sugarcoat the misogynistic realities that lie at the heart of most of these legends and folk tales we’ve loved for so long."

Writing for Grimdark Magazine, Fiona Denton praised the novel for its handling child abuse, although she warned that some readers would feel uncomfortable with the violent treatment that Cordelia experiences at the hands of her mother. Denton's review stated that "The relationship between Cordelia and her mother is meant to make readers uncomfortable, and it does. But if you have been a survivor of a similar abusive relationship, the depiction may well make you feel more than awkward. Kingfisher handles this relationship with the delicacy it warrants, and it feels essential for the plot. It is a highly effective portrayal; I have rarely disliked a character so quickly and intently as I did Evangeline for how she treats her daughter."

Writing for Locus, Liz Bourke praised the character of Hester, stating "It’s a delight to see a woman like Hester as a main character, ageing comfortably, with a bad leg and some regrets but fundamentally secure in who she is as a person..." Bourke concluded that:

A Sorceress Comes to Call boasts a tightly claustrophobic atmosphere of gathering doom. It marries a compelling cast of characters to a wicked sense of humour, a deft grasp of pace and absolutely nailbiting tension. Kingfisher has outdone herself again: this is the perfect blend of Gothic horror and fantasy of manners that I didn’t know I needed.

Year	Award	Category	Result	Ref.
2024	Nebula Award	Novel	Finalist	
2025	Hugo Award	Novel	Finalist	
2025	Locus Award	Fantasy Novel	Won	
2025	RUSA Reading List	Fantasy	Shortlisted	
