= InterGalactic Medicine Show =

Speculative fiction magazine

- Website type: Sci-Fi & Fantasy Webzine
- Owner: Hatrack River Enterprises
- Creator: Orson Scott Card
- Website: intergalacticmedicineshow.com
- Commercial: Yes
- Registration: Annual subscription
- Launched: October 2005
- Current status: Defunct since June 2019

InterGalactic Medicine Show (sometimes shortened to IGMS) was an American online fantasy and science fiction magazine. It was founded in 2005 by multiple award-winning author Orson Scott Card and was edited by Edmund R. Schubert from 2006–2016, after which Scott Roberts took over. It was originally biannual, but became quarterly in 2008 and bimonthly in 2009, except for a brief hiatus in 2010. The magazine ceased publication in June 2019.

== History ==
The magazine's original publishing schedule, as reported on Sci Fi Wire on 29 September 2005, was to be quarterly, with columns updated monthly. The first issue was released 15 October 2005, the second released 1 March 2006, the third was released 2 October 2006 and the fourth was released 20 February 2007. Since the fifth issue in July 2007, new issues have been released quarterly. Beginning in March 2009, the magazine's schedule was increased to bi-monthly, while the amount of content per issue was slightly reduced.

The first two issues were edited by Card himself. The magazine was edited by Edmund R. Schubert from June 2006 until June 2016. Scott Roberts took over as the editor beginning in July 2016.

In June 2019, the magazine ceased publication with issue #69.

== Stories and features ==
IGMS featured original stories by such award-winning authors as Peter S. Beagle, David Farland, Tim Pratt, Eugie Foster, Bud Sparhawk, Mary Robinette Kowal, James Maxey, Mette Ivie Harrison, Sharon Shinn, Eric James Stone and Orson Scott Card. In addition to short fiction, each issue was fully illustrated and includes audio content, and serialization of longer works by Card.

In 2009, Greg Siewert's story, "The Absence of Stars: Part One" won the WSFA Small Press Award for best short story of the year. In 2011 Nick Greenwood won the Chesley Award for Best Cover Illustration (Magazine) for issue #17's cover, and in 2014 Alex Shvartzman's "Explaining Cthulhu to Grandma" won another WSFA Small Press Award. Other IGMS stories have been nominated for national awards and have been reprinted in various Year's Best anthologies, as well as appearing on the Locus (magazine) annual recommended reading list.

In addition to the fiction, the site featured weekly columns and reviews, along with regular author interviews.

== Anthology ==
Orson Scott Card's InterGalactic Medicine Show, an anthology reprinting selected stories from the webzine, was published by Tor in August, 2008, edited by Edmund R. Schubert and Orson Scott Card.

Two further reprint anthologies were published as e-books; a collection of stories winning the magazine's reader's award, InterGalactic Medicine Show Awards Anthology, Vol. I Kindle Edition in 2012, and a second anthology, IGMS: Big Book of SF Novelettes, published by Hatrack River as an e-book in 2013, with further reprints of stories that have appeared in the magazine.

== Staff ==
- Orson Scott Card, Publisher and Executive Editor
- Scott Roberts, Editor (July 2016 – June 2019)
- Cyndie Swindlehurst, Managing Editor
- Scott J. Allen, Web Designer
- Sara Ellis, Assistant Editor
- Chris Bellamy, Assistant Editor & Art Director
- Lauren M. Harris, Assistant Editor (started in 2015)
- John Ellis, Assistant Editor
- Lawrence M. Schoen, Reprint Editor

=== Former staff ===
- Kathleen A. Bellamy, Managing Editor
- Edmund R. Schubert, Editor (June 2006-June 2016)
- Eric James Stone, Assistant Editor (departed at the end of 2014)

== See also ==
- List of works by Orson Scott Card
