= Sun, Moon, Dust =

Short story by Ursula Vernon

"Sun, Moon, Dust" is a 2017 fantasy short story by Ursula Vernon. It was first published in Uncanny Magazine.

== Synopsis ==
Allpa's grandmother bequeaths him a magical sword which, when drawn, invokes three warrior spirits — Sun, Moon, and Dust — who are sworn to aid him in combat. However, Allpa is a potato farmer, and has no need of warriors.

== Reception ==
"Sun, Moon, Dust" was a finalist for the 2018 Hugo Award for Best Short Story.

Apex Magazine called it "sweet [and] quiet", noting that it is "about growth of all kinds". Tangent Online considered it to be a "delight", lauding Vernon's "seamless" exposition, but questioned whether the story's resolution was compatible with the nature of the sword's enchantment. Amal el-Mohtar, who subsequently read the story for Uncanny's podcast, stated that it was "kind (and) charming", and about "the right to not be a warrior".
