= Digger (webcomic) =

Webcomic series by Ursula Vernon

- Cover art for the omnibus edition
- Author: Ursula Vernon
- Website: www.diggercomic.com
- Current status/schedule: completed
- Launch date: March 18, 2003
- End date: March 17, 2011
- Genre: Fantasy

Digger is a webcomic drawn and written by Ursula Vernon, and published in print form by Sofawolf Press. Digger won a Hugo Award for Best Graphic Story and a Mythopoeic Award, and was nominated for an Eisner Award.

== Story ==
In the opening pages, a wombat called Digger is tunneling alone through the ground, lost and dazed after being intoxicated by a pocket of bad air. Digging to the surface, she emerges in a temple, where she meets the Statue of Ganesh. Here she finds that something or someone has "magicked up" her tunnel, cutting off her route home. The comic describes her experiences and encounters in the temple, nearby village and surrounding area as she seeks information on the whereabouts of her warren, how she came from there to her present location, and how she might get back.

== Characters ==
- Digger-of-Unnecessarily-Convoluted-Tunnels, the title character, "Digger" for short. A young hard-headed wombat, lost far from home after tunnelling into a miasma of unknown magic. She comes from a mining background, and speaks with unironic delight about the digging of ditches and cellars. She has an extreme dislike of all things magical, and by extension of all things divine, though she increasingly tolerates the Statue and what it represents, as he has shown himself to be trustworthy.
- "Ed": A hyena, outcast from his tribe. Once a famous skin-painter (tattoo artist), in his isolation he has turned his skills to cave-wall painting. His actual name is unknown, having been "eaten", but Digger named him "Ed" shortly after their first meeting. His people (who, like real hyenas, are fiercely matriarchal) consider him a pariah. Ed insists upon referring to Digger as "Digger-mousie" and has a rather shaky grasp of whatever language is spoken by the other main characters – although he is otherwise highly intelligent and capable of complicated philosophical conversations. Both his broken language and philosophical outlook are most likely the result of having spent seventeen years in exile. A later strip reveals he was in an abusive relationship with a hyena known as Blood-Eyes, whom he killed after realizing that she was also abusing their daughter. This led to his expulsion from the tribe.
- Shadowchild: A small supernatural creature, unsure of what it is and wanting to know. There is a running gag based on Digger assuring the Shadowchild of various unlikely things it definitely is not, e.g.: a leaf; a water sapphire. Shadowchild is, apparently, a demon and has some disturbing powers, but it seems friendly and well-intentioned. Shadowchild left the series after an encounter with the demon Sweetgrass-Voice, who attempted to get it to eat its friends. Shadowchild then ate it, causing it to grow. It said goodbye to Digger before going to attempt to persuade other demons to be peaceful or die trying.
- The Statue: A living statue of the Hindu god Ganesh, located in the temple where Digger surfaces after first getting lost underground. Friendly and generous with the temple food-offerings, representative of his dedication to compassion. The priests and staff at his temple are human (though the library is tended with the aid of rats, winged versions of which also serve as its messengers), as are the local villagers.
- The Veiled: The local theocratic police force, not entirely friendly. They conceal the lower half of their faces with veils, that the gods might rely on the Veiled as a whole and not individually.
- Captain Jhalm: The leader of the Veiled. Claims to be fond of Digger, due in part to her unusually open dislike of the Veiled. He definitely distrusts Digger, and may intend her serious harm.
- Murai: A lapsed member of the Veiled, who apparently was once an acolyte of the Statue and the god of which it is an avatar. She is the most amicable of the Veiled whom Digger has met, but is troubled in her mind as a consequence of a previous uncomfortably close encounter with a goddess: she is prone to mad fits of babbling when she hears children screaming, or "the darkness begins to shine."
- Grim Eyes: Hyena warrior and leader of a hunting party from the local tribe. Started out as an enemy of Digger, they became friends when she was saved by her from falling from a bridge. Now Digger's cousin by adoption, she has joined her and Murai on an important journey. In addition, she is all but outright stated to be Ed's daughter.
- Boneclaw Mother: The matriarch of the Hyena tribe. There's a council of elders (of which she is the head), but most of them don't have much sense in Boneclaw Mother's view. Boneclaw Mother is blind, and relies on a highly developed sense of smell, and despite her laidback attitude and tendency to say what she thinks, she's by no means senile.
- The Hag: The local healer and witch. Human. Young for the job, and sensitive about her age.
- Oracular Slug: A slug gifted with knowledge of the future thanks to an old, depressing incident at a druid's microbrewery.
- Surka: A professional bridge troll who is not actually a troll at all, but rather a female warrior shrew with a colorful past.

Other characters encountered include the hyenas of Grim Eyes' tribe, human villagers and farmers, human bandits, the acolytes of Ganesh's temple (some of whom hide a disturbing secret beneath their hoods), metaphorical pigeons, skin lizards, a dead god and its servants, and vampiric squash. Dwarves exist in Digger's world, noted for their reliance on magic, but none appear in the comic.

== Reception ==
Digger has won the Web Cartoonists' Choice Award for "Outstanding Black and White Art" in 2005 and 2006, and for "Outstanding Anthropomorphic Comic" in 2006. In 2006, Digger was nominated for an Eisner Award in the category "Talent Deserving of Wider Recognition". The collected Digger won the 2012 Hugo Award for Best Graphic Story and the 2013 Mythopoeic Fantasy Award for Adult Literature.

Tor.com has described Digger as "fantastic-in-all-senses-of-the-word", praising Vernon's pacing and "tone-perfect mythology", while SF Signal declared that Digger "deserves to be appreciated" and Black Gate lauded Vernon for her portrayal of cultural relativity. Lauren Davis of io9 and ComicsAlliance called Digger an "oddball epic" and praised the titular heroine as an unusual fantasy protagonist and "a delight to watch", citing her pragmatic but softhearted nature, her frankness, and her strong moral center and sense of etiquette.

The series has drawn comparisons to Bone, Cerebus, and Discworld.

== Publication ==
The series has been published in six volumes by Sofawolf Press between 2005 and 2011. In 2013, a Kickstarter was successfully held to have the entire series printed in omnibus form. In 2022, a Kickstarter was successfully held for a 10th anniversary collection from Underthing Press, an imprint of Grim Oak Press. Underthing Press's founder, Patrick Rothfuss, stated that he'd always daydreamed of starting his own imprint and he decided to create Underthing Press when he realized he couldn't buy a new copy of the Digger omnibus after giving his copy to a friend.

Volume	Year	ISBN	Chapters
1	2005	0-9769212-2-7	1–2
2	2006	0-9769212-6-X	3–4
3	2007	0-9791496-3-0	5–6
4	2009	978-0-9819883-3-7	7–8
5	2010	978-0-9819883-9-9	9–10
6	2011	978-1-936689-06-4	11–12
Omnibus	2013	978-1-936689-32-3 (softcover); 978-1-936689-33-0 (hardcover)	1–12
Omnibus (Unearthed)	2022	978-1-956000-25-2 (softcover); 978-1-956000-26-9 (hardcover); 978-1-956000-24-5 (ebook)	1–12
