= A Wizard's Guide to Defensive Baking =

2020 novel by Ursula Vernon

- Author: T. Kingfisher
- Publisher: Argyll Productions
- Publication date: July 21, 2020
- ISBN: 978-1-614-50524-2

A Wizard's Guide to Defensive Baking is a 2020 young adult fantasy novel by Ursula Vernon, under her pseudonym T. Kingfisher. It was first published by Argyll Productions.

== Synopsis ==
When teenage bread wizard Mona discovers a corpse in her aunt's bakery, it triggers a chain of events. With the aid of animate gingerbread men, her familiar (a sourdough starter named Bob), and a few friends, they fight the Spring Green Man and Inquisitor Oberon, and lead the city in the fight against the Carex mercenaries.

== Reception and awards ==
James Nicoll called A Wizard's Guide to Defensive Baking "an entertaining YA diversion that will encourage younger readers to consider just how easily they might be scapegoated by an ambitious politician," and emphasized that he would "enjoy" reading a sequel. Locus commended Vernon's "ability to craft engagingly quirky characters", and her portrayal of "a Pratchettian world where magic makes for a mostly amusing background, except when it doesn't."

In 2020, Locus named A Wizard's Guide to Defensive Baking among the best young adult novels of the year.

Awards and honors
Year	Award	Result	Ref.
2020	Andre Norton Award	Won	
2021	Dragon Award for Best Young Adult / Middle Grade Novel	Won	
2021	Locus Award for Best Young Adult Book	Won	
2021	Lodestar Award for Best Young Adult Book	Won	
2021	Mythopoeic Award for Children's Literature	Won	
