= Nettle & Bone =

2022 fantasy novel by T. Kingfisher

- Author: T. Kingfisher
- Language: English
- Genre: Fantasy
- Publisher: Tor Books, Titan Publishing Group (UK)
- Publication date: 26 Apr 2022
- Publication place: United States
- Pages: 272
- ISBN: 978-1-250-24403-1

Nettle & Bone is a 2022 fantasy novel by Ursula Vernon, writing as T. Kingfisher. The novel has been described as a dark fairy tale. It won the 2023 Hugo Award for Best Novel; it was also a finalist for the 2023 Locus Award for Best Fantasy Novel and the 2022 Nebula Award for Best Novel.

== Plot ==
Marra is the youngest of three princesses. Her eldest sister Damia marries Prince Vorling, but dies several months later. Kania, the middle sister, then marries Vorling. Marra is sent to a convent.

Kania's daughter dies. At the funeral, she tells Marra that Vorling is abusing her. Marra decides to leave the convent and save her sister.

Marra seeks help from a dust-wife, who gives her three seemingly impossible tasks: weave a cloak from nettles, make a dog from bones, and catch moonlight in a jar. After Marra completes the tasks, the dust-witch agrees to help her kill Vorling. Along with a demon-possessed chicken, the pair journey to Vorling's kingdom.

Along the way, they rescue a knight named Fenris from a goblin market. They also recruit Agnes, Marra's fairy godmother. Agnes is a well-meaning godmother who is much better at giving curses than blessings. Agnes takes Marra to meet with Vorling's fairy godmother. The godmother is bound to Vorling's family due to a curse from a long-dead king. Marra and her friends break the curse, allowing the old godmother to die peacefully.

Kania gives birth to a healthy baby boy. At the christening, Agnes claims the role of godmother. She curses the baby to grow up fatherless. Fenris kills Vorling. Kania becomes queen regent. Marra and Fenris fall in love and leave Kania's kingdom together.

== Major themes ==
At Tor.com, Martin Cahill observes that Kingfisher "doesn't shrink or hide from how often fairy tales brutalize young women, how so many stories take their agency, their bodies, and their will for use and abuse by kingdoms and kings alike." Marra's two older sisters are married to an abusive prince, and her mother is helpless to stop him. Marra knows that if her sister dies in childbirth, she will likely be forced to marry him as well. Marra gathers a group of comrades "to end her sister's abuse". In this way, Cahill states that Kingfisher argues "no monster is completely untouchable".

Christina Ladd of Strange Horizons considered that Nettle & Bone is a book about abuse and trauma. Kingfisher explores the concept of utilitarianism; Marra's mother knows that Kania is being abused, but chooses to place the safety of her whole kingdom over that of her daughter. Marra rejects this utilitarian argument by choosing to save her sister. Kingfisher repeats the motif of difficult choices throughout the story. For example, Marra has to make a choice between allowing Fenris to be tortured and saving the rest of the group; Agnes has to make choices between "bad and worse" blessings. This acknowledgement that compromises are necessary "implies gently that maybe we can understand the kinds of calculations Marra’s mother and sister have been making". The same review also praised the way in which Kingfisher uses humor to contrast with the darkness of the plot. Ladd writes that "the thing that nobody tells you about trauma is that it's hilarious", drawing references to the work of philosopher Theodor Adorno. Ladd states that the novel "holds everything in tension and never lets the complexity collapse into something trite or grim."

According to the Chicago Review of Books, the novel explores the idea of the hero's journey as something that is taken under duress. Marra's parents and the convent both have the ability to intervene against Vorling, but refuse to do so. Thus, the task belongs to Marra and the dust-wife, two "grouchy older women who have determinedly set out to right wrongs".

Caitlyn Paxson, writing for National Public Radio, noted that Kingfisher draws tropes from a variety of different fairy tales (including Bluebeard, The Six Swans, and Goblin Market), rather than sticking closely to one particular template.

== Style ==
The story is told in a non-linear fashion. The opening scene of the novel involves Marra crafting the bone dog, and the narrative then returns to explain how she arrived there.

== Publication history ==
The characters and world of Nettle & Bone were first introduced in "Godmother", an earlier short story by T. Kingfisher.

== Reception ==
Writing for Paste, Lacy Baugher Milas called the novel "a sharp, less-than-three-hundred-page novel that packs the emotional punch of an epic three times its length". She positively compared the novel to the works of Peter S. Beagle for their combination of bleakness and beauty. In Baugher's opinion, Nettle & Bone "threads the thin line between humor, horror, and heart in order to create something that feels both fresh and utterly necessary." Publishers Weekly gave the novel a starred review, stating that it handled tricky subjects such as domestic violence "with great compassion and care". The same review called the story a "marvelous romp" and "a story of good people doing their best to make the unjust world a fairer place". A review for Tor.com praised the dynamic characters and complex worldbuilding, calling it "a rose of a book with thorns running throughout ... [recommended] no matter what kind of reader you are".

The Chicago Review of Books praised the novel for its darkness and its re-interpretation of classic fairy tale tropes. A review in Grimdark Magazine praised the "twisted mix of morbid horror and sweet delight" as well as the novel's ensemble cast, giving the book 4 out of 5 stars.

Liz Bourke of Locus Magazine praised the "excellently bizarre worldbuilding", writing that Kingfisher's work reminded her of Terry Pratchett "at his best". Caitlyn Paxton of NPR praised the novel for its use of two older female protagonists, Marra and the dust-wife. She notes that she was not engaged by the non-linear structure of the opening chapter, but praised the remainder of the novel and its subversion of standard fairy tale tropes.

Awards and Honors
Year	Award	Result	Ref.
2022	Dragon Award for Best Novel	Nominee	
2022	Nebula Award for Best Novel	Finalist	
2023	Hugo Award for Best Novel	Won	
2023	Locus Award for Best Fantasy Novel	Finalist	
