= The Tomato Thief =

2016 novelette by Ursula Vernon

- Author: Ursula Vernon
- Language: English
- Publication date: 2016

"The Tomato Thief" is a 2016 fantasy novelette by Ursula Vernon. It was first published in Apex Magazine and has been reprinted in the collection Jackalope Wives and Other Stories.

== Synopsis ==
When Grandma Harken (protagonist of "Jackalope Wives") stays up late to catch whoever is stealing fresh tomatoes from her garden, she finds herself drawn into a complex magical plot involving shapechangers, space warps, and gods.

== Reception ==
"The Tomato Thief" won the 2017 Hugo Award for Best Novelette (for works of 7,500 to 17,500 words). Tor.com called it "excellent", noting that the story is a rare example of "older women as the protagonists of their own stories", and comparing Grandma Harken to Granny Weatherwax. Tangent Online considered it to be "hard to put back down".
