= Thornhedge =

2023 novella by T. Kingfisher

- First edition cover
- Author: T. Kingfisher
- Language: English
- Publisher: Tor Books
- Publication date: August 3, 2023
- Publication place: United States
- Media type: Print (hardcover)
- Pages: 128 (hardcover)
- Awards: 2024 Hugo Award for Best Novella; 2024 Locus Award for Best Novella
- ISBN: 978-1-250-24409-3 (1st ed. hardcover)
- OCLC: 1392000037
- Dewey Decimal: 813/.6

Thornhedge is a 2023 novella by Ursula Vernon, writing under the pen name T. Kingfisher. The novella is a reimagining of the story of Sleeping Beauty. It won the 2024 Hugo Award for Best Novella and 2024 Locus Award for Best Novella.

== Plot ==
Toadling guards a wall of thorns which conceal a sleeping princess in a tower. She hopes that humans will eventually forget the existence of the tower and its occupant.

Hundreds of years later, a knight approaches the hidden tower. Toadling tries to tie elf-knots into his hair to scare him away, but he awakens and discovers her. The knight tells her that his name is Halim and claims to be looking for the lost princess.

Toadling narrates her story to Halim. She was born a human princess and switched with a changeling at birth. She was raised in Faerie by frog-like creatures called greenteeth. Because time passes differently in Faerie, she was able to return to the human world and stand as the fairy godmother for the christening of the changeling, Fayette. The Faerie hare goddess instructed Toadling to give Fayette a gift: "she will do no harm to those around her." Toadling messed up the words of the spell, rendering it ineffective. As Fayette grew, she became increasingly violent and unpredictable. At first she tortured animals. Later, her nurse fell down the stairs and died; Fayette puppeted the corpse around the palace. Toadling could not bring herself to kill Fayette and so decided to place her in an enchanted sleep. She grew the hedge of thorns around the keep for the protection of the outside world.

Halim and Toadling enter the tower and accidentally wake Fayette. Fayette tries to strangle Toadling; Halim pushes her out of the tower and kills her. The hare goddess returns to Toadling and reveals that the initial gift of "doing no harm" would have killed Fayette anyway, as the dead cannot harm anyone. The goddess brings Toadling back to Faerie, where she reunites with her family of greenteeth. She returns to the mortal world to journey with Halim, but plans to return home to Faerie someday.

== Major themes ==
Gary K. Wolfe writes that the novella exists in "that liminal space ... between fairytale lore and actual medieval history". The opening chapter "serves as a remarkable evocation of loneliness" as Toadling watches the centuries pass around her. Later, Halim's "references to the Pope, the Byzantine-Seljuk wars, and his own Muslim background" place the story more firmly in a historical context.

=== Good and Evil ===
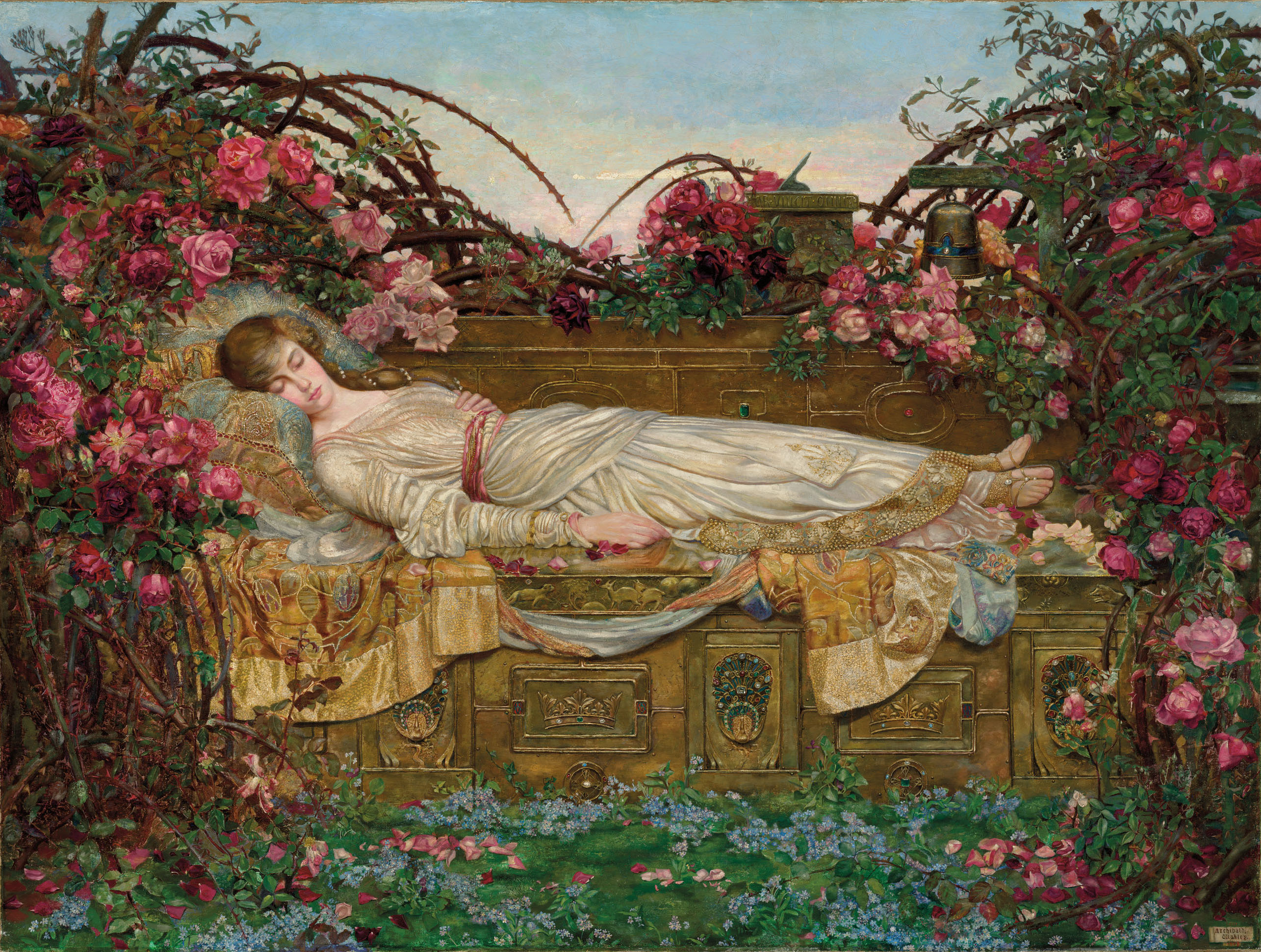
The Sleeping Beauty. Painted by Archibald Wakely in 1903. Source: https://www.christies.com/en/lot/lot-6290721

In the traditional tale of Sleeping Beauty, the princess symbolizes good and the fairy symbolizes evil. However, not all versions of Sleeping Beauty have an evil character. Perceforest is a 14th century epic containing a version of Sleeping Beauty. This version tells the story of princess Zellandine, who was cursed to eternal sleep by one of the three goddesses (Themis) who were invited to celebrate her birth. In Giambattista Basile's 17th century work Sun, Moon, and Talia the princess Talia's father consults astrologers who prophesy that Talia will be in danger, referencing her slumber caused by a splinter of flax. There are no evil fairies, or the mention of fairies, until Charles Perrault's version, The Sleeping Beauty in the Wood and the Brothers Grimm fairytale, Little Briar Rose. In the 1959 Disney film Sleeping Beauty, the word "evil" is used to refer to Maleficent, and her name also means evil-doer.

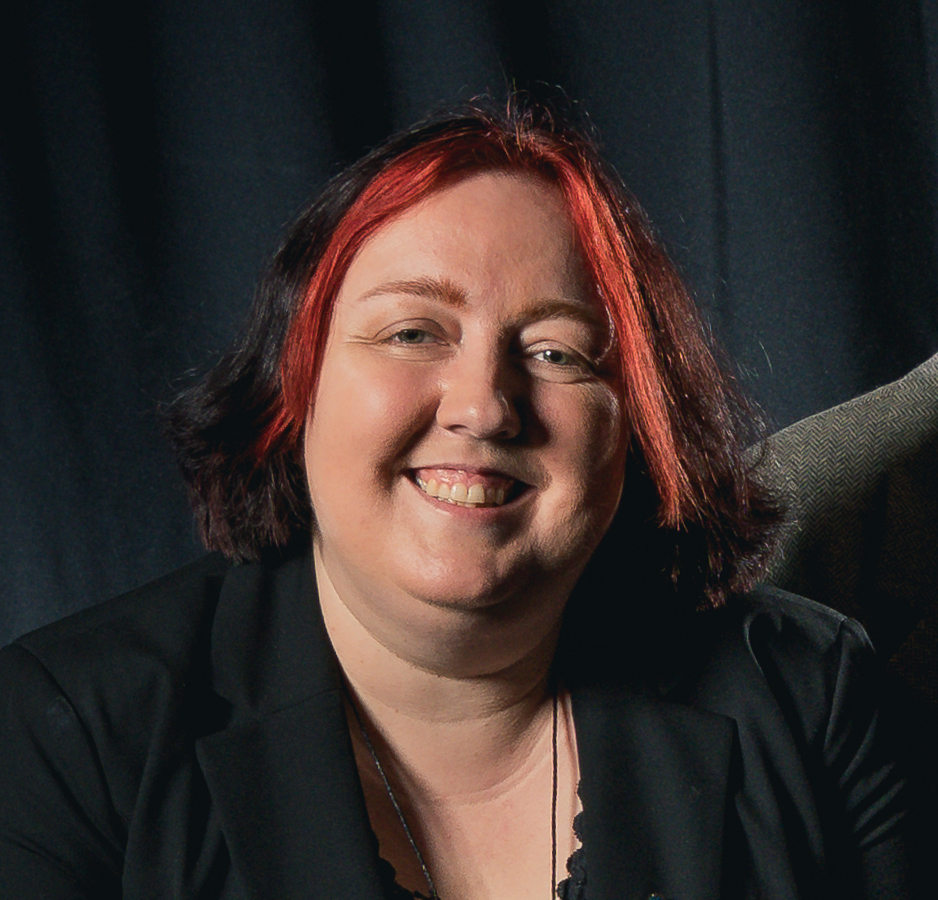
T. Kingfisher. Author of Thornhedge. "Worldcon 75 – Pre-Hugo Portraiture is licensed under a Creative Commons Attribution 4.0 International License. (https://creativecommons.org/licenses/by/4.0/)"

According to the author from the book review in the blog Plain-Spoken Pen (2023), in Thornhedge, the theme of evil and good is reversed; the princess Fayette represents evil and the fairy Toadling represents good. Moreover, in the review the author states that, "Toadling was supposed to be the princess, but she was stolen by the fae and a changeling was left in her place. She was raised by the greenteeth, trained in the ways of their magic". From this it can be interpreted that the princess and fairy roles in this novella merge, as Toadling is the true princess, and then changes into a fairy when she enters the fairy realm.

=== Friendship and Family ===
Thornhedge, unlike other tales of Sleeping Beauty, emphasizes the theme of friendship and familial bonds. Toadling's relationship with the greenteeth is similar to that of mothers and daughters, and she cared for them dearly and vice-versa. "Surrounded by child-eating swamp spirits, Toadling felt intensely loved " (Kingfisher, 2023). However, Toadling wasn't able to find the same love form her real parents, The King and The Queen. Additionally, Toadling had other friends from the swamp, the Kelpies.

Halim and Toadling's relationship is similar to that of platonic friends. Their interactions are polite and respectful and both understand each other's perspectives or views. According to the review in Publishers Weekly, Halim doesn't judge Toadling after she narrates her story to him, and helps her defeat Fayette. Moreover, Halim isn't disgusted by Toadling's toad form and befriends her. This aspect isn't present in the other versions of Sleeping Beauty, such as Little Briar Rose, or Sleeping Beauty in the Wood.

=== Beauty ===
In the novella, T. Kingfisher, emphasizes "beauty" not by the typical beauty standards. In the novella, Toadling is described as being hideous, and her mothers, the greenteeth, are also described as hideous. "No. I have many mothers. If I am hideous, then we are hideous together. And that made it easier, because in her heart of hearts, she could not believe that her mothers were anything but beautiful" (Kingfisher, 2023). Beauty is not limited to a particular standard or personality. However, in original Sleeping Beauty and its versions, the princess is interpreted to be beautiful, not hideous. "A legend of a fort with a magnificently beautiful princess sleeping within".

Another interpretation of beauty in Thornhedge, is that "beauty" is perceived from within and not from external appearances. According to a review by The Literary Escape (2023), "beauty is the sum of the good qualities of a fairy rather than their appearance." Externally, in the novel, Fayette is described as beautiful but internally she is evil. Whereas Toadling, although not beautiful externally, is still able to embody beauty through her kind nature and caring personality from within. Therefore, according to another reviewer, The Plain-Spoken Pen, Thronehedge is a novella that explores, among other topics, "deceptive nature of the outer self."

== Reception and awards ==
Publishers Weekly gave the novella a starred review, writing that "Kingfisher's trademark wit and compassion transforms "Sleeping Beauty" into a moving meditation on guilt, grief, and duty, as well as a surprisingly sweet romance between outsiders." Fiona Denton of Grimdark Magazine gave the novella five out of five stars, calling it "an exceptionally written, bitesize piece of escapism".

Writing for The New York Times, author Amal El-Mohtar stated that the novella has a "particularly fine flexibility of tone that bends from sweet and shy to tragic and frightening". In Paste, Lacy Baugher Milas wrote that the novel is different from modern fairy tales, which are often seen as "colorful, romantic stories of princesses in magical castles, dashing princes, and first kisses". Instead, the novel hearkens to the stories of the Brothers Grimm, which are "sharp, dark things, often uncomfortable, always complicated." Milas also wrote that "no one is doing more with less in the fantasy space than Kingfisher. Not a single word is wasted—even the punctuation feels insanely purposeful—and its delicate descriptors, mournful tone, and carefully crafted dialogue all feel deliberately arranged for maximum emotional and narrative impact."

Adrienne Martini of Locus wrote that the work is "both kind and brutal as it shows how narrow the power of love is". She also praised the novella's short length as "exactly as long as it should be – and we're fortunate to have so many publishers willing to give these longer short works a chance to delight an audience." Also writing for Locus, Gary K. Wolfe called the novella a "strikingly original" take on the Sleeping Beauty tale, based on a "central reversal". He also wrote that Thornhedge is "a masterful demonstration of what novellas do best" and that "Toadling is one of the more endearing and memorable characters I've encountered this year, and pretty much the same can be said for her tale." Martin Cahill of Tor.com called the book "atmospheric and engrossing", particularly praising the protagonist Toadling as "a protagonist I would gladly read about for many years to come."

Awards and honors
Year	Award	Category	Result	Ref.
2023	Nebula Award	Novella	Finalist	
2024	British Fantasy Award	Novella	Finalist	
2024	Hugo Award	Novella	Won	
2024	Locus Award	Novella	Won	
2024	World Fantasy Award	Novella	Finalist	
