= Stephanie Burgis =

Adult and children's fantasy writer

- Born: May 28, 1977 (age 49); East Lansing, Michigan, U.S.
- Education: Michigan State University; Oberlin Conservatory of Music; University of Pittsburgh (M.A.)
- Website: stephanieburgis.com

Stephanie Burgis (born May 28, 1977) is an American fantasy writer for both children and adults.

== Biography ==
Though born in East Lansing, Michigan, in 1977, Burgis is based in Wales along with husband Patrick Samphire and their two children. Burgis went to Michigan State University, studied music history and French horn performance in the Oberlin Conservatory of Music and then completed a year as a Fulbright scholar in Vienna. Burgis went on to get a master's in historical musicology from the University of Pittsburgh and in 2002 she moved to the UK and began a PhD in the University of Leeds on the topic of opera and politics in 18th-century Vienna. The research led to her book Masks and Shadows. She also spent time in orchestras before she settled in the UK.

In 1996 Burgis was assistant to the Clarion workshop director and in 2001 she attended Clarion West. In 2011 she won the inaugural Waverton Good Read Children's Award for her novel A Most Improper Magick. She has a prolific list of works both novels and short stories as well as articles. Burgis has published in Strange Horizons, Daily Science Fiction, and Beneath Ceaseless Skies and others.

== Bibliography ==
- Enchanting the Fae Queen (2026)
- Wooing the Witch Queen (2025)
- Good Neighbors (2022)
- Deadly Courtesies (2022)
- Fine Deceptions (2022)
- Fierce Company (2022)
- Scales and Sensibility (2021)
- The Dragon with a Chocolate Heart (2017)
- The Girl with the Dragon Heart (2018)
- The Princess Who Flew with Dragons (2019)
- Spellswept (2018)
- Snowspelled (2017)
- Thornbound (2019)
- Moontangled (2020)
- Spellcloaked (2021)
- The Raven Heir (2021)
- A Most Improper Magick (2010)
- A Tangle of Magicks (2011)
- A Reckless Magick (2012)
- Courting Magic (2014)
- Masks and Shadows (2016)
- Congress of Secrets (2016)
