= What Moves the Dead =

2022 novella by T. Kingfisher

- First edition
- Author: T. Kingfisher
- Audio read by: Avi Roque
- Cover artist: Christina Mrozik
- Language: English
- Series: Sworn Soldier #1
- Genre: Horror, gothic fiction
- Set in: Gallacia (a fictional country); Ruravia (a countryside principality related to Gallacia)
- Publisher: Tor Nightfire
- Publication date: July 12, 2022
- Publication place: United States
- Pages: 176 pp (hardcover 1st ed.)
- Awards: Locus Award for Best Horror Novel (2023)
- ISBN: 9781250830753 (hardcover 1st ed.)
- OCLC: 1298715029
- Dewey Decimal: 813/.6
- LC Class: PS3611.I597 W53 2022
- Followed by: What Feasts at Night

What Moves the Dead is a 2022 horror novella by Ursula Vernon, writing under the pen name T. Kingfisher. It is based on the short story "The Fall of the House of Usher" by Edgar Allan Poe. The novella received critical acclaim, winning the 2023 Locus Award for Best Horror Novel and becoming a finalist for the 2023 Hugo Award for Best Novella.

A standalone sequel entitled What Feasts at Night was published on February 13, 2024.

== Plot ==
Retired soldier Alex Easton, formerly of the Gallacian army, receives word that kan (Note: The fictional Gallacian language contains seven sets of personal pronouns. This includes a set of pronouns specifically for soldiers, regardless of their sex assigned at birth.) childhood friend Madeline Usher is dying. Ka journeys to the Ushers' ancestral home in Ruravia and finds it in disrepair, surrounded by fungus and a dark, unsettling tarn.

Roderick Usher, Madeline's twin brother and Easton's subordinate, has become nervous and frail in the intervening years. Madeline is terminally ill, suffering from catalepsy. She appears cachectic, and Easton is disturbed by the thin, wispy appearance of the hair on her arms. Also present are Eugenia Potter, a mycologist; James Denton, an American doctor; and Angus, Easton's batman. Easton tries to convince Madeline to leave the moldering mansion for her own health, but she refuses.

Easton notices that the hares near the tarn behave oddly, as if they are infected with an unknown disease. Ka sees strange lights moving in the tarn at night. Madeline begins sleepwalking, and her stilted gait reminds Easton of the hares. Easton postulates that Madeline and the hares have the same illness. Ka shoots a hare and attempts to dissect it, but the dead hare begins to crawl away. Easton, terrified, flees back to the manor.

Madeline dies; her body is placed in the crypt. Roderick claims to hear her knocking on the doors of the crypt, trying to get out. Easton visits Madeline's body and finds that her neck is broken. Eugenia deduces that the changes in Madeline's hair were due to fungal hyphae. Easton brings her to examine the body, but it has vanished in the interim. While Roderick sleeps, the others dissect a hare and find it full of fungus. The carcass continues to move on its own, seemingly controlled by the infestation.

Denton admits that Roderick killed Madeline, believing her to be possessed. They enter Roderick's bedroom, where they find Madeline sitting on the bed, her neck hanging at a shocking angle. Madeline tells them that she has been dead for at least a month; the fungus from the tarn is reanimating her body. Madeline tells them that the tarn is conscious and sentient, and that it is learning how to communicate with them. She asks Easton to let it infect kan, giving it a home after her corpse breaks down. Easton and Denton flee; Roderick stays behind to burn down the house, with himself and Madeline's corpse still inside. The survivors poison the tarn with sulfur, killing the remaining fungus.

== Reception ==
Publishers Weekly praised Kingfisher's "standout character work and scenic descriptions that linger on the palate", calling the novel "thoroughly creepy and utterly enjoyable." Writing for Booklist, Erin Downey Howerton called the novel an "infectious new spin on classic Gothic horror", stating that it "will lure fans of classics like Henry James's The Turn of the Screw, as well as those who like modern environmental terror like Jeff VanderMeer's Annihilation (2014) and English folk horror movies like In the Earth (2021)."

Writing for Paste, Lacy Baugher Milas stated that "every word of What Moves the Dead feels carefully chosen and deliberately arranged for maximum emotional impact." Milas praised Kingfisher's characters, particularly noting that "Madeline Usher is granted both the presence and an intriguing level of agency that she doesn't really get much of in Poe's original, and though the end of her story is the same—as it must be—the road to her inevitable death is a much more interesting one."

Jason Archbold of the Chicago Review of Books wrote that What Moves the Dead transposes the original short story "into the territory of contemporary identity politics and, at the same time, the body horror subgenre." Archbold praised the expansion of "small cast of somewhat two-dimensional personalities", particularly noting that the "fungal growths which proliferate around the Usher manor perhaps gain the most from Kingfisher's retelling, going from mere description to essentially being a character in their own right". The review praised Kingfisher's focus on the characters, finding that character-driven horror is almost always more effective than cosmic horror. The review criticized Kingfisher's decision to fictionalize the settings, writing that "It is clear that Kingfisher is trying to do with Poe and gender what Victor LaValle did with Lovecraft and race in The Ballad of Black Tom or what Margaret Atwood did with Homer's Odyssey in The Penelopiad; this lens, however, neither reflects upon the original nor furthers the story she is trying to tell with it".

== Awards ==
Year	Award	Category	Result	Ref.
2022	Goodreads Choice Awards	Horror	Finalist	
2023	Hugo Award	Novella	Finalist	
2023	Locus Award	Horror Novel	Won	
2023	RUSA Reading List	Horror	Shortlisted	
