= Swordheart =

2018 fantasy romance novel by T. Kingfisher

- Author: T. Kingfisher
- Language: English
- Series: Swordheart
- Release number: 1
- Genre: Fantasy romance; sword and sorcery
- Set in: the World of the White Rat
- Publisher: Tor Books
- Publication date: 27 November 2018
- Publication place: United States
- Pages: 426
- ISBN: 9781250400222
- Followed by: Daggerbound

Swordheart is a 2018 fantasy romance novel by Ursula Vernon, writing under the pen name T. Kingfisher. It is set in a shared universe that Vernon calls "the World of the White Rat" with several of the author's other novels, including the Clocktaur War novels and The Saint of Steel novels. Swordheart is the first of a planned trilogy: its sequel, Daggerbound, was released August 25, 2026, and the last book, Shieldborn, is projected to be in August 2027.

== Plot ==
Halla inherits the estate of her wealthy granduncle by marriage, Silas. Her money-hungry relatives scheme to steal the inheritance. Her grandaunt Malva locks Halla in her room until she agrees to marry Malva's son, Alver. While locked in her bedroom, she unsheathes the decorative sword on the wall, planning to commit suicide. A knight named Sarkis appears, promising to serve the wielder of the enchanted sword. Sarkis helps Halla escape the house.

As they travel along the road, they are accosted by both robbers and by priests of the Motherhood, a dangerous religious sect. They eventually reach the town of Amalcross and the home of Bartholomew, a friend of Silas and a fellow antiques collector. Bartholomew agrees to help them in exchange for his pick of Silas's antiques.

Sarkis and Halla then travel to the city of Archon's Glory, hoping to seek legal advice from the Temple of the White Rat. The priests offer to assist Halla in exchange for a portion of Silas's estate. Robbers attack Halla in a bid to steal the sword, but Sarkis defeats them. He kisses her, but they do not yet pursue a further relationship.

Halla and Sarkis journey back to Rutger's Howe. They are accompanied by the Rat priest Zale and the gnole (Note: Gnoles are sentient humanoid creatures similar to large badgers.) Brindle. Along the way, they are harassed by the Motherhood. After one priest of the Hanged Mother pushes Halla, a fight breaks out. Sarkis and Brindle kill the Mother's priests. While hiding the bodies, the group becomes trapped in the Vagrant Hills. These magical hills do not follow the normal laws of geography. After escaping the hills and fighting off more bandits, they finally arrive back in Rutger's Howe.

Zale brings Halla's relatives to court; Bartholomew testifies in her favor. The court finds in favor of Halla. She returns to Silas's home, which now belongs to her. Sarkis and Halla confess their desire for each other and make love. Sarkis realizes that he cannot move forward with Halla without revealing the secrets of his past. He was once the leader of a mercenary troop. He betrayed his employer; he and two of his closest companions were imprisoned inside swords as punishment. Halla is angry at the deception and storms out. Bartholomew picks up the sword, becoming the new wielder. He promptly leaves Rutger's Howe with Nolan and Sarkis. Halla returns home, planning to forgive Sarkis. Instead, she finds he is not there, but she is accosted by Aunt Malva and her cousin Alver. He ties her hands and leaves her with Zale; Alver tells them both he will have to kill them, at his mother's direction. They free themselves. During their escape, Halla stabs Alver, who is then arrested. Halla and Zale leave town to find Sarkis.

Bartholomew discusses the sword with Nolan, a member of the Order of the Sainted Smith. The Smith was the woman who originally imprisoned Sarkis and his companions within their magical swords. Nolan kills Bartholomew and becomes the new wielder. Halla and Zale arrive in Amalcross. Nolan orders Sarkis to kill Halla. Instead, Sarkis stabs himself with his own sword. This allows Halla an opening to shoot Nolan in the leg with her crossbow. She threatens to kill Nolan, who renounces ownership of the sword to her. Nolan is arrested.

Sarkis and Halla return to Rutger's Howe. The two marry and begin a new life together. They receive a letter from Zale, who informs them that Nolan has died in prison and that his order has located another magical sword.

== Reception ==
Writing for Locus, Adrienne Martini praised the "wonderfully drawn, fully fleshed-out characters" of Halla and Sarkis. The review stated that Kingfisher's "silliness and heart, both of which thrum just under the story" were the spark that "makes the story crackle". Martini also praised the relatively low stakes of the story, stating that "No one is saving the world as they know it, nor will anyone perish if Halla's quest to have Silas's will honored fails".

Liz Bourke of Reactor wrote that the novel "exemplifies what is best in Kingfisher's work: the generosity of spirit, the eye for the ridiculous, the compassion and the pragmatism, the humour and the weirdness".

Bourke further commented on the novel's place among both fantasy romances and sword and sorcery books:

[Swordheart is] a quintessentially sword-and-sorcery sort of romance: Halla's quest is, at root, about a very understandable problem. She just meets with a lot of strangeness on the way, usually with generosity of spirit and kindness, frequently with many questions, and often with a deep pragmatism and sense of humour. Sarkis, the man bound to a sword, belongs to the classics of sword-and-sorcery, and mutters about "decadent civilisation" with the best of them. Their roadtrip together recalls in part the atmosphere of Robert E. Howard or Fritz Leiber, in part Jennifer Roberson's Tiger and Del or Mercedes Lackey's Tarma and Kethry stories, but with Kingfisher's trademark sense of the ridiculous and with updated sensibilities.
