= Locus Award for Best Horror Novel =

Literary award by Locus magazine

The Locus Award for Best Horror Novel is a literary award given annually by Locus as part of their Locus Awards. It has also been known as both the Locus Award for Best Horror/Dark Fantasy Novel and Locus Award for Best Dark Fantasy/Horror Novel.

== Naming ==
- Locus Award for Best Horror Novel (1989–90, 1994, since 2017)
- Locus Award for Best Horror/Dark Fantasy Novel (1991–93, 1996–97)
- Locus Award for Best Dark Fantasy/Horror Novel (1995, 1999)

== Winners ==
Full list of category winners at Science Fiction Awards Database.

=== Original run (1989–1999) ===
Year	Novel	Author	Ref.
1989	Those Who Hunt the Night	Barbara Hambly	
1990	Carrion Comfort	Dan Simmons	
1991	The Witching Hour	Anne Rice	
1992	Summer of Night	Dan Simmons	
1993	Children of the Night	Dan Simmons	
1994	The Golden	Lucius Shepard	
1995	Fires of Eden	Dan Simmons	
1996	Expiration Date	Tim Powers	
1997	Desperation	Stephen King	
1998	No award		
1999	Bag of Bones	Stephen King	

=== Current run (since 2017) ===
Year	Novel	Author	Ref.
2017	The Fireman	Joe Hill	
2018	The Changeling	Victor LaValle	
2019	The Cabin at the End of the World	Paul G. Tremblay	
2020	Black Leopard, Red Wolf	Marlon James	
2021	Mexican Gothic	Silvia Moreno-Garcia	
2022	My Heart Is a Chainsaw	Stephen Graham Jones	
2023	What Moves the Dead	T. Kingfisher	
2024	A House with Good Bones	T. Kingfisher	
2025	Bury Your Gays	Chuck Tingle	
2026	The Buffalo Hunter Hunter	Stephen Graham Jones	
