= Kelly Barnhill =

Kelly Barnhill may refer to:

- Kelly Barnhill (author) (born 1973), American author of children's literature, fantasy and science fiction
- Kelly Barnhill (softball) (born 1997), American softball pitcher
