= Misty Massey =

American fantasy author

- Born: c. 1970 (age c. 54)
- Occupation: Novelist
- Children: 1 son
- Writing career
- Genre: Fantasy
- Website: mistymassey.com

Misty Massey (born c. 1970) is an American fantasy author. Her first novel, Mad Kestrel (ISBN 9780765318022), was published in 2008 by Tor Books. It was given a three-star rating by Romantic Times. Massey has also published short stories in magazines.

Massey is one of the founding members of the blog, MagicalWords.net. Magical Words is dedicated to helping newer writers with all aspects of the craft and business of writing, and a book based on the blog, How To Write Magical Words: A Writer's Companion was published by Bella Rosa Books in 2011.

Massey lives in South Carolina with her husband and son. She works as a middle school librarian. Hobbies include belly dancing and playing a pirate at Renaissance fairs.
