= Dragon Awards =

Set of American literary and media awards

- Awarded for: Best science fiction, fantasy, horror, and alternate history works of previous year
- Location: Atlanta, Georgia
- Country: United States
- Presented by: Dragon Con
- First award: 2016
- Website: awards.dragoncon.org

The Dragon Awards are a set of literary and media awards presented annually by Dragon Con. Voted on by fandom, the awards highlight excellence in the speculative categories of science fiction, fantasy, horror, and alternate history across various media — novels, comic books, movies, television series, video games, and tabletop enterprises.

== History ==
The Dragon Awards were first presented in 2016, created on the occasion of the 30th anniversary of Dragon Con to "recognize excellence in all things Science Fiction and Fantasy." By 2018, 11,000 voters cast a ballot, given out annually at Dragon Con in Atlanta, Georgia.

A distinct feature of the awards, there is a diverse set of subgenera on the ballot.

The finalists for the first Dragon Awards were announced on August 11, 2016, and the winners were announced on September 4 that year.

In 2017, nominated authors Allison Littlewood, John Scalzi, and N. K. Jemisin asked Dragon Con to remove their names from the ballot; Scalzi subsequently reconsidered and remained in the contest. However, the coordinators of the Dragon Awards initially refused to remove the other authors' names from the running, which generated criticism across blogs and science fiction related publications, ultimately leading the organizers to comply with nominee wishes when they desire to abstain.

== Nomination and voting processes ==
The nominations and votes are collected electronically. Participation is available to everyone, requiring only an e-mail address, but no membership or other fees, to vote. The Dragon Awards website states that they "[reserve] the right to invalidate suspect or questionable ballots without notice," and that "All decisions regarding the voting process and selection of winners shall be made by DRAGON CON in its sole discretion, shall be final, and shall not be subject to challenge or appeal." Language describing the review of nominations does not state that nominations are counted numerically but are "gathered and reviewed to create a final ballot." Neither counts of nominations nor votes have ever been made public.

The award process consists of two steps:

- a nomination step where each voter nominates one work of choice in each category. The nominations are "gathered and reviewed to create a final ballot."
- a voting step where the finalists selected from the nominated works are voted on by each voter.

== Reception ==
The Dragon Awards have been criticized because of the appearance that the awards were created in conjunction with campaigns by the Rabid and Sad Puppies to attack the Hugo Award. Another concern raised is regarding the opaqueness of the nomination and voting process.

== Winners ==
The full list of last-stage nominees can be found at List of Dragon Award finalists.

=== Best Science Fiction Novel ===
Year	Work	Author(s)	Publisher(s)	Ref.
2016	Somewhither: Being the First Part of A Tale of the Unwithering Realm	John C. Wright	Castalia House	
2017	Babylon's Ashes	James S. A. Corey	Orbit Books	
2018	Artemis	Andy Weir	Crown Publishing Group	
2019	A Star-Wheeled Sky	Brad R. Torgersen	Baen Books	
2020	The Last Emperox	John Scalzi	Tor Books	
2021	Project Hail Mary	Andy Weir	Ballantine Books	
2022	Leviathan Falls	James S. A. Corey	Hachette Book Group	
2023	The Icarus Plot	Timothy Zahn	Baen Books	
2024	Starter Villain	John Scalzi	Tor Books	
2025	This Inevitable Ruin	Matt Dinniman	Ace Books	
2026	Operation Bounce House	Matt Dinniman	Ace Books	

=== Best Fantasy Novel ===
Year	Work	Author(s)	Publisher(s)	Ref.
2016	Son of the Black Sword	Larry Correia	Baen Books	
2017	Monster Hunter Memoirs: Grunge	Larry Correia, John Ringo	Baen Books	
2018	Oathbringer	Brandon Sanderson	Tor Books	
2019	House of Assassins	Larry Correia	Baen Books	
2020	The Starless Sea	Erin Morgenstern	Doubleday	
2021	Battle Ground	Jim Butcher	Ace Books	
2022	Book of Night	Holly Black	Tom Doherty Associates	
2023	Witch King	Martha Wells	Tordotcom	
2024	Iron Flame	Rebecca Yarros	Red Tower Books	
2025	The Devils	Joe Abercrombie	Tor Books	
2026	Twelve Months*	Jim Butcher	Ace	

=== Best Horror Novel ===
Year	Work	Author(s)	Publisher(s)	Ref.
2016	Souldancer	Brian Niemeier	self-published	
2017	The Changeling	Victor LaValle	Spiegel & Grau	
2018	Sleeping Beauties	Stephen King and Owen King	Scribner	
2019	Little Darlings	Melanie Golding	Crooked Lane Books	
2020	The Twisted Ones	T. Kingfisher	Saga	
2021	The Hollow Places	T. Kingfisher	Saga	
2022	The Book of Accidents	Chuck Wendig	Del Rey Books	
2023	A House with Good Bones	T. Kingfisher	Tor Books	
2024	Black River Orchard	Chuck Wendig	Del Rey Books	
2025	Bury Your Gays	Chuck Tingle	Tor Nightfire	
2026	King Sorrow	Joe Hill	Morrow; Headline UK	

=== Best Alternate History Novel ===
Year	Work	Author(s)	Publisher(s)	Ref.
2016	League of Dragons	Naomi Novik	Del Rey Books	
2017	Fallout	Harry Turtledove	Del Rey Books	
2018	Uncharted	Kevin J. Anderson and Sarah A. Hoyt	Baen Books	
2019	Black Chamber	S. M. Stirling	Baen Books	
2020	Witchy Kingdom	D. J. Butler	Baen Books	
2021	1637: No Peace Beyond the Line	Eric Flint and Charles E. Gannon	Baen Books	
2022	The Silver Bullets of Annie Oakley	Mercedes Lackey	DAW Books	
2023	Lost In Time	A. G. Riddle	Head of Zeus	
2024	All the Dead Shall Weep	Charlaine Harris	Saga Press	
2025	The Martian Contingency	Mary Robinette Kowal	Tor Books	
2026	The Winds of Fate	S.M. Stirling	Baen Books	

=== Best Military Science Fiction or Fantasy Novel ===
The category "Best Military Science Fiction or Fantasy Novel" was removed from the awards in 2023.

Year	Work	Author(s)	Publisher(s)	Ref.
2016	Hell's Foundations Quiver	David Weber	Tor Books	
2017	Iron Dragoons	Richard Fox	Triplane Press	
2018	A Call to Vengeance	Timothy Zahn, David Weber and Thomas Pope	Baen Books	
2019	Uncompromising Honor	David Weber	Baen Books	
2020	Savage Wars	Jason Anspach & Nick Cole (author)	Galaxy's Edge	
2021	Gun Runner	Larry Correia & John Brown	Baen Books	
2022	A Call to Insurrection	David Weber, Timothy Zahn, and Thomas Pope	Simon & Schuster	

=== Best Apocalyptic Novel ===
The category "Best Apocalyptic Novel" was removed from the awards in 2018.

Year	Work	Author(s)	Publisher(s)	Ref.
2016	Ctrl Alt Revolt!	Nick Cole	self-published	
2017	Walkaway	Cory Doctorow	Tor Books	

=== Best Media Tie-In Novel ===
The category "Best Media Tie-In Novel" was first introduced in 2018 and removed from the awards in 2023.

Year	Work	Author(s)	Publisher(s)	Ref.
2018	Leia: Princess of Alderaan	Claudia Gray	Disney-Lucasfilm	
2019	Thrawn: Alliances	Timothy Zahn	Penguin Random House	
2020	Firefly: The Ghost Machine	James Lovegrove	Titan Books	
2021	Firefly: Generations	Tim Lebbon	Titan Books	
2022	Star Wars: Thrawn Ascendancy: Lesser Evil	Timothy Zahn	Random House Worlds	

=== Best Young Adult / Middle Grade Novel ===
Year	Work	Author(s)	Publisher(s)	Ref.
2016	The Shepherd's Crown	Terry Pratchett	Doubleday	
2017	The Hammer of Thor	Rick Riordan	Disney-Hyperion Books	
2018	Children of Blood and Bone	Tomi Adeyemi	Henry Holt and Company	
2019	Bloodwitch	Susan Dennard	Tor Books	
2020	Finch Merlin and the Fount of Youth	Bella Forrest	Nightlight Books	
2021	A Wizard's Guide to Defensive Baking	T. Kingfisher	Argyll Productions	
2022	A Dark and Starless Forest	Sarah Hollowell	HMH Books for Young Readers	
2023	The Golden Enclaves	Naomi Novik	Del Rey Books	
2024	Midnight at the Houdini	Delilah S. Dawson	Delacorte Press	
2025	Sunrise on the Reaping	Suzanne Collins	Scholastic Press	
2026	Ride or Die	Delilah S. Dawson	Delacorte	

=== Best Illustrative Cover ===
The category "Best Illustrative Cover" was first introduced in 2023.

Year	Work	Artist(s)	Author(s)	Publisher(s)	Ref.
2023	Tower of Silence	Kurt Miller	Larry Correia	Baen Books	
2024	Of Jade and Dragons	Kelly Chong	Amber Chen	Viking Books for Young Readers	
2025	Wind and Truth	Michael Whelan	Brandon Sanderson	Tor Books	
2026	Hemlock & Silver	T. Kingfisher	T. Kingfisher	Tor; Tor UK	

=== Best Comic Book ===
The categories "Best Comic Book" and "Best Graphic Novel" were combined into a single category in 2023.

Year	Work	Author(s)/ Artist(s)	Publisher(s)	Ref.
2016	Ms. Marvel	Sana Amanat, Stephen Wacker, G. Willow Wilson, Adrian Alphona	Marvel Comics	
2017	The Dresden Files: Dog Men	Jim Butcher, Mark Powers	Dynamite Entertainment	
2018	Mighty Thor	Jason Aaron and Russell Dauterman	Marvel Comics	
2019	Saga	Brian K. Vaughan and Fiona Staples	Image Comics	
2020	Avengers	Jason Aaron & Ed McGuinness	Marvel	
2021	X-Men	Jonathan Hickman & Mahmud Asrar	Marvel	
2022	Immortal X-Men	Kieron Gillen and Mark Brooks	Marvel	

=== Best Graphic Novel ===
The categories "Best Comic Book" and "Best Graphic Novel" were combined into a single category in 2023.

Year	Work	Author(s)/ Artist(s)	Publisher(s)	Ref.
2016	The Sandman: Overture	Neil Gaiman, J. H. Williams III	Vertigo Comics	
2017	The Dresden Files: Wild Card	Jim Butcher, Carlos Gomez	Dynamite Entertainment	
2018	White Sand, Volume 1	Brandon Sanderson, Rik Hoskin and Julius M. Gopez	Dynamite Entertainment	
2019	X-Men: Grand Design – Second Genesis	Ed Piskor	Marvel Comics	
2020	Battlestar Galactica: Counterstrike!	John Jackson Miller & Daniel HDR	Dynamite Entertainment	
2021	The Magicians: New Class	Lev Grossman, Lilah Sturges & Pius Bak	Archaia Entertainment	
2022	Dune: House Atreides Volume 2	Brian Herbert, Kevin J. Anderson, and Dev Pramanik	BOOM! Studios	

=== Best Comic Book/Graphic Novel ===
"Best Comic Book" and "Best Graphic Novel" existed as separate categories before 2023.

Year	Work	Author(s)/ Artist(s)	Publisher(s)	Ref.
2023	Dune: House Harkonnen	Brian Herbert, Kevin J. Anderson, and Michael Shelfer	BOOM! Studios	
2024	Monstress	Marjorie Liu and Sana Takeda	Image Comics	
2025	Daredevil: Cold Day In Hell	Charles Soule and Steve McNiven	Marvel Comics	
2026	Something is Killing the Children	James Tynion IV and Werther Dell’Edera		

=== Best Science Fiction or Fantasy Movie ===
Year	Work	Creator(s)	Studio	Ref.
2016	The Martian	Ridley Scott (director), Drew Goddard (writer)	Scott Free Productions, Kinberg Genre	
2017	Wonder Woman	Patty Jenkins (director), Allan Heinberg (writer), Zack Snyder (writer), Jason Fuchs (writer)	RatPac-Dune Entertainment, DC Films, Tencent Pictures, Wanda Pictures, Atlas Entertainment, Cruel and Unusual Films	
2018	Black Panther	Ryan Coogler (director, writer), Joe Robert Cole (writer)	Marvel Studios	
2019	Avengers: Endgame	Russo brothers (directors)	Marvel Studios	
2020	Star Wars: The Rise of Skywalker	J. J. Abrams	Disney	
2021	The Old Guard	Gina Prince-Bythewood	Netflix	
2022	Dune	Denis Villeneuve	Legendary Pictures	
2023	Dungeons & Dragons: Honor Among Thieves	Jonathan Goldstein (director, writer), John Francis Daley (director, writer), Michael Gilio (writer)	Paramount Pictures	
2024	Dune: Part Two	Denis Villeneuve (director, writer), Jon Spaihts (writer)	Legendary Pictures	
2025	Deadpool & Wolverine	Shawn Levy (director, writer), Ryan Reynolds (writer)	Marvel Studios	
2026	Project Hail Mary	Phil Lord and Christopher Miller		

=== Best Science Fiction or Fantasy TV Series ===
Year	Work	Creator(s)	Released on	Ref.
2016	Game of Thrones	David Benioff and D. B. Weiss	HBO	
2017	Stranger Things	The Duffer Brothers	Netflix	
2018	Game of Thrones	David Benioff and D. B. Weiss	HBO	
2019	Good Omens	Neil Gaiman	Amazon Prime Video	
2020	The Mandalorian	Jon Favreau	Disney+	
2021	The Expanse	Mark Fergus and Hawk Ostby	Amazon Prime Video	
2022	Stranger Things	The Duffer Brothers	Netflix	
2023	The Sandman	Neil Gaiman, David S. Goyer and Allan Heinberg	Netflix	
2024	Fallout		Amazon Prime Video	
2025	Andor		Disney+	
2026	A Knight of the Seven Kingdoms		HBO	

=== Best Science Fiction or Fantasy PC/Console Game ===
The categories "Best Science Fiction or Fantasy PC/Console Game" and "Best Science Fiction or Fantasy Mobile Game" were combined into a single category in 2023.

Year	Work	Publisher(s)	Ref.
2016	Fallout 4	Bethesda Softworks	
2017	The Legend of Zelda: Breath of the Wild	Nintendo	
2019	Middle-earth: Shadow of War	Monolith Productions	
2019	Red Dead Redemption 2	Rockstar Games	
2020	Star Wars Jedi: Fallen Order	Respawn Entertainment	
2021	Assassin's Creed: Valhalla	Ubisoft	
2022	Elden Ring	Bandai Namco Entertainment	

=== Best Science Fiction or Fantasy Mobile Game ===
The categories "Best Science Fiction or Fantasy PC/Console Game" and "Best Science Fiction or Fantasy Mobile Game" were combined into a single category in 2023.

Year	Work	Developers(s)	Ref.
2016	Fallout Shelter	Bethesda Softworks	
2017	Pokémon Go	Niantic	
2018	Harry Potter: Hogwarts Mystery	Jam City	
2019	Harry Potter: Wizards Unite	Niantic, WB Games San Francisco	
2020	Minecraft Earth	Mojang Studios	
2021	Harry Potter: Puzzles and Spells	Zynga	
2022	Diablo Immortal	Blizzard	

=== Best Digital Game ===
"Best Science Fiction or Fantasy PC/Console Game" and "Best Science Fiction or Fantasy Mobile Game" existed as separate categories before 2023.

Year	Work	Publisher(s)	Ref.
2023	The Legend of Zelda: Tears of the Kingdom	Nintendo	
2024	Baldur's Gate 3	Larian Studios	
2025	Assassin's Creed Shadows	Ubisoft Quebec	
2026	Hollow Knight: Silksong	Team Cherry	

=== Best Science Fiction or Fantasy Board Game ===
The categories "Best Science Fiction or Fantasy Board Game" and "Best Science Fiction or Fantasy Miniatures / Collectible Card / Role-Playing Game" were combined into a single category in 2023.

Year	Work	Publisher(s)	Ref.
2016	Pandemic: Legacy	Z-Man Games	
2017	Betrayal at House on the Hill: Widow's Walk	Avalon Hill	
2018	Red Dragon Inn 6: Villains	Slugfest Games	
2019	Betrayal Legacy	Avalon Hill Games	
2020	Tapestry	Stonemaier Games	
2021	Imperium	Dire Wolf Games	
2022	Star Wars Outer Rim: Unfinished Business	Fantasy Flight Games	

=== Best Science Fiction or Fantasy Miniatures / Collectible Card / Role-Playing Game ===
Year	Work	Publisher(s)	Ref.
2016	Call of Cthulhu Roleplaying Game (7th edition)	Chaosium	
2017	Magic: The Gathering: Eldritch Moon	Wizards of the Coast	
2018	Magic: The Gathering: Unstable	Wizards of the Coast	
2019	Call of Cthulhu: Masks of Nyarlathotep Slipcase Set	Chaosium	
2020	Magic: The Gathering: Throne of Eldraine	Wizards of the Coast	
2021	Warhammer: Age of Sigmar: Soulbound Role-Playing Game	Cubicle 7	
2022	Magic: The Gathering, Dungeons & Dragons: Adventures in the Forgotten Realms	Wizards of the Coast	

=== Best Tabletop Game ===
"Best Science Fiction or Fantasy Board Game" and "Best Science Fiction or Fantasy Miniatures / Collectible Card / Role-Playing Game" existed as separate categories before 2023.

Year	Work	Publisher(s)	Ref.
2023	Magic the Gathering: The Lord of the Rings: Tales of Middle-earth	Wizards of the Coast	
2024	D&D The Deck of Many Things	Wizards of the Coast	
2025	Magic the Gathering: Final Fantasy	Wizards of the Coast	
2026	Forgotten Realms: Heroes of Faerûn	Wizards of the Coast	
