= List of Dragon Award nominees =

This is a list of Dragon Award finalists.

== Novels ==
=== Best Science Fiction Novel ===
* Winner(s)

Year	Work	Author(s)	Publisher(s)	Ref.
2016	Somewhither: Being the First Part of A Tale of the Unwithering Realm *	John C. Wright	Castalia House	
2016	Agent of the Imperium	Marc Miller	Far Future Enterprises	
2016	Ancillary Mercy	Ann Leckie	Orbit Books	
2016	Aurora	Kim Stanley Robinson	Orbit Books	
2016	The Life Engineered	J-F. Dubeau	Sword & Laser	
2016	Raising Caine	Charles E. Gannon	Baen Books	
2017	Babylon's Ashes *	James S. A. Corey	Orbit Books	
2017	A Closed and Common Orbit	Becky Chambers	Harper Voyager	
2017	The Collapsing Empire	John Scalzi	Tor Books	
2017	Death's End	Cixin Liu	Tor Books	
2017	Escaping Infinity	Richard Paolinelli	Tuscany Bay Books	
2017	Rise	Brian Guthrie	self-published	
2017	The Secret Kings	Brian Niemeier	self-published	
2017	Space Tripping	Patrick Edwards	Inkshares	
2018	Artemis *	Andy Weir	Crown Publishing Group	
2018	It Takes Death to Reach a Star	Gareth Worthington and Stu Jones	Vesuvian Books	
2018	The Mutineer's Daughter	Chris Kennedy and Thomas A. Mays	Theogony Books	
2018	Persepolis Rising	James S. A. Corey	Orbit Books	
2018	Sins of Her Father	Mike Kupari	Baen Books	
2018	Win	Vera Nazarian	Norilana Books	
2019	A Star-Wheeled Sky *	Brad R. Torgersen	Baen Books	
2019	Europe at Dawn	Dave Hutchinson	Solaris Books	
2019	A Memory Called Empire	Arkady Martine	Tor Books	
2019	Record of a Spaceborn Few	Becky Chambers	Harper Voyager	
2019	Red Moon	Kim Stanley Robinson	Orbit Books	
2019	Tiamat's Wrath	James S. A. Corey	Orbit Books	
2020	The Last Emperox *	John Scalzi	Tor Books	
2020	The Future of Another Timeline	Annalee Newitz	Tor Books	
2020	Gideon the Ninth	Tamsyn Muir	Tor Books	
2020	Network Effect	Martha Wells	Tor Books	
2020	The Rosewater Redemption	Tade Thompson	Orbit Books	
2020	The Ten Thousand Doors of January	Alix E. Harrow	Redhook	
2020	The Testaments	Margaret Atwood	Nan A. Talese	
2020	Wanderers	Chuck Wendig	Del Rey Books	
2021	Project Hail Mary *	Andy Weir	Ballantine Books	
2021	Attack Surface	Cory Doctorow	Tor Books	
2021	Black Sun	Rebecca Roanhorse	Saga Press	
2021	A Desolation Called Peace	Arkady Martine	Tor Books	
2021	The Ministry for the Future	Kim Stanley Robinson	Orbit Books	
2021	Machine	Elizabeth Bear	Saga Press	
2021	Ready Player Two	Ernest Cline	Ballantine Books	
2022	Leviathan Falls *	James S. A. Corey	Orbit Books	
2022	Goliath	Tochi Onyebuchi	Tor Books	
2022	The Kaiju Preservation Society	John Scalzi	Tor Books	
2022	Shards of Earth	Adrian Tchaikovsky	Orbit Books	
2022	You Sexy Thing	Cat Rambo	Tor Books	
2023	The Icarus Plot *	Timothy Zahn	Baen Books	
2023	Eversion	Alastair Reynolds	Orbit Books	
2023	The Spare Man	Mary Robinette Kowal	Tor Books	
2023	Children of Memory	Adrian Tchaikovsky	Orbit Books	
2023	Translation State	Ann Leckie	Orbit Books	
2023	Neom	Lavie Tidhar	Tachyon Publications	
2023	The Daughter of Moreau	Silvia Moreno-Garcia	Del Rey	
2024	Starter Villain *	John Scalzi	Tor Books	
2024	Beyond the Ranges	John Ringo, James Aidee	Baen Books	
2024	System Collapse	Martha Wells	Tor Books	
2024	The Jinn-Bot of Shantiport	Samit Basu	Tor Books	
2024	The Saint of Bright Doors	Vajra Chandrasekera	Tor Books	
2024	Theft of Fire	Devon Eriksen	self-published	
2024	These Burning Stars	Bethany Jacobs	Orbit Books	
2025	This Inevitable Ruin *	Matt Dinniman	Ace	
2025	Nether Station	Kevin J. Anderson	Blackstone	
2025	The Folded Sky	Elizabeth Bear	Saga	
2025	Alliance Unbound	C.J. Cherryh & Jane Fancher	DAW	
2025	The Mercy of Gods	James S.A. Corey	Orbit	
2025	Extremophile	Ian Green	Head of Zeus	
2025	Absolution	Jeff VanderMeer	Picador	
2026	Operation Bounce House*	Matt Dinniman	Ace	
2026	God’s Junk Drawer	Peter Clines	Blackstone	
2026	The Faith of Beasts	James S.A. Corey	Orbit	
2026	Radiant Star	Ann Leckie	Orbit US	
2026	Slow Gods	Claire North	Orbit US; Orbit UK	
2026	The Shattering Peace	John Scalzi	Tor; Tor UK	

=== Best Fantasy Novel ===
* Winner(s)

Year	Work	Author(s)	Publisher(s)	Ref.
2016	Son of the Black Sword *	Larry Correia	Baen Books	
2016	The Aeronaut's Windlass	Jim Butcher	Roc	
2016	Asteroid Made of Dragons	G. Derek Adams	Sword & Laser	
2016	Blood Hound	James Osiris Baldwin	Gift Horse Productions	
2016	Changeling's Island	Dave Freer	Baen Books	
2016	The Fifth Season	N. K. Jemisin	Orbit Books	
2016	Grave Measures	R. R. Virdi	self-published	
2017	Monster Hunter Memoirs: Grunge *	Larry Correia, John Ringo	Baen Books	
2017	Beast Master	Shayne Silvers	Argento Publishing	
2017	Blood of the Earth	Faith Hunter	Roc Books	
2017	Dangerous Ways	R. R. Virdi	self-published	
2017	The Heartstone Thief	Pippa DaCosta	self-published	
2017	A Sea of Skulls	Vox Day	Castalia House	
2017	Wings of Justice	Michael-Scott Earle	self-published	
2018	Oathbringer *	Brandon Sanderson	Tor Books	
2018	The Land: Predators	Aleron Kong	Tamori Publications	
2018	Shoot the Messenger	Pippa DaCosta	Crazy Ace Publishing	
2018	A Tempered Warrior	Jon R. Osborne	New Mythology Press	
2018	The Traitor God	Cameron Johnston	Angry Robot	
2018	War Hammer	Shayne Silvers	Argento Publishing	
2019	House of Assassins *	Larry Correia	Baen Books	
2019	Deep Roots	Ruthanna Emrys	Tor.com	
2019	Foundryside	Robert Jackson Bennett	Crown Publishing Group	
2019	Lies Sleeping	Ben Aaronovitch	Gollancz	
2019	The Raven Tower	Ann Leckie	Orbit Books	
2019	Spinning Silver	Naomi Novik	Del Rey Books	
2020	The Starless Sea *	Erin Morgenstern	Doubleday	
2020	The Burning White	Brent Weeks	Orbit Books	
2020	Dead Astronauts	Jeff VanderMeer	MCD	
2020	Gods of Jade and Shadow	Silvia Moreno-Garcia	Del Rey Books	
2020	Jade War	Fonda Lee	Orbit Books	
2020	Ninth House	Leigh Bardugo	Flatiron Books	
2021	Battle Ground *	Jim Butcher	Ace Books	
2021	Dead Lies Dreaming	Charles Stross	Tor Books	
2021	The Invisible Life of Addie LaRue	V. E. Schwab	Tor Books	
2021	The Once and Future Witches	Alix E. Harrow	Redhook	
2021	Piranesi	Susanna Clarke	Bloomsbury Publishing	
2021	Rhythm of War	Brandon Sanderson	Tor Books	
2022	Book of Night *	Holly Black	Tor Books	
2022	Age of Ash	Daniel Abraham	Orbit Books	
2022	Moon Witch, Spider King	Marlon James	Riverhead Books	
2022	Light from Uncommon Stars	Ryka Aoki	Tor Books	
2022	Nettle & Bone	T. Kingfisher	Tor Books	
2022	Jade Legacy	Fonda Lee	Orbit Books	
2023	The Witch King *	Martha Wells	Orbit Books	
2023	Tower of Silence	Larry Correia	Tor Books	
2023	Babel	R. F. Kuang	Orbit Books	
2023	Tress of the Emerald Sea	Brandon Sanderson	Tor Books	
2023	Into the Vortex	Charles E. Gannon	Baen Books	
2023	The Atlas Paradox	Olivie Blake	Tor Books	
2024	Iron Flame *	Rebecca Yarros		
2024	He Who Drowned the World	Shelley Parker-Chan		
2024	House of Open Wounds	Adrian Tchaikovsky		
2024	My Brother's Keeper	Tim Powers		
2024	The Water Outlaws	S. L. Huang		
2024	Three Kinds of Lucky	Kim Harrison		
2025	The Devils *	Joe Abercrombie	Tor	
2025	Long Live Evil	Sarah Rees Brennan	Orbit	
2025	Heart of the Mountain	Larry Correia	Baen	
2025	The Last Shield	Cameron Johnston	Angry Robot	
2025	Shadow of the Smoking Mountain	Howard Andrew Jones	Baen	
2025	The Black Bird Oracle	Deborah Harkness	Ballantine	
2026	Twelve Months*	Jim Butcher	Ace	
2026	Academy of Outcasts	Larry Correia	Aethon	
2026	The Lost Reliquary	Lyndsay Ely	Saga	
2026	Hell to Pay	Sherrilyn Kenyon	Oliver Heber	
2026	Red City	Marie Lu	Tor	
2026	Queen Demon	Martha Wells	Tor	

=== Best Young Adult / Middle Grade Novel ===
* Winner(s)

Year	Work	Author(s)	Publisher(s)	Ref.
2016	The Shepherd's Crown *	Terry Pratchett	Doubleday	
2016	Calamity	Brandon Sanderson	Delacorte Press	
2016	Carry On	Rainbow Rowell	St. Martin's Griffin	
2016	Changeling's Island	Dave Freer	Baen Books	
2016	Six of Crows	Leigh Bardugo	Henry Holt	
2016	Steeplejack	A. J. Hartley	Tor Teen	
2016	Trix & the Faerie Queen	Alethea Kontis	self-published	
2016	Updraft	Fran Wilde	Tor Books	
2017	The Hammer of Thor *	Rick Riordan	Disney-Hyperion Books	
2017	A Court of Wings and Ruin	Sarah J. Maas	Bloomsbury USA	
2017	Defy the Stars	Claudia Gray	Little, Brown Books for Young Readers	
2017	Firebrand	A. J. Hartley	Tor Teen	
2017	It's All Fun and Games	Dave Barrett	Nerdist / Inkshares	
2017	Rachel and the Many-Spendored Dreamland	L. Jagi Lamplighter	Wisecraft Publishing	
2017	Swan Knight's Son	John C. Wright	Castalia House	
2018	Children of Blood and Bone *	Tomi Adeyemi	Henry Holt	
2018	Brightly Burning	Alexa Donne	Houghton Mifflin Harcourt	
2018	Cold Bath Street	A. J. Hartley	UCLan Publishing	
2018	A Court of Frost and Starlight	Sarah J. Maas	Bloomsbury Children's Books	
2018	Warcross	Marie Lu	G. P. Putnam's Sons	
2018	When Tinker Met Bell	Alethea Kontis	Sugar Skull Books	
2019	Bloodwitch *	Susan Dennard	Tor Teen	
2019	Archenemies	Marissa Meyer	Feiwel and Friends	
2019	Armageddon Girls	Aaron Michael Ritchey	Shadow Alley Press	
2019	Imposters	Scott Westerfeld	Scholastic Press	
2019	The King's Regret	Philip Ligon	Silver Empire	
2019	The Pioneer	Bridget Tyler	Tor Teen	
2019	Sawkill Girls	Claire Legrand	Katherine Tegen Books	
2020	Finch Merlin and the Fount of Youth *	Bella Forrest	Nightlight Press	
2020	Catfishing on CatNet	Naomi Kritzer	Tor Teen	
2020	COG	Greg van Eekhout	HarperCollins	
2020	Force Collector	Kevin Shinick	Disney Lucasfilm Press	
2020	The Grace Year	Kim Liggett	Wednesday Books	
2020	The Poison Jungle	Tui T. Sutherland	Scholastic	
2021	A Wizard's Guide to Defensive Baking *	T. Kingfisher	Red Wombat Studio	
2021	A Deadly Education	Naomi Novik	Del Rey	
2021	Elatsoe	Darcie Little Badger	Levine Querido	
2021	A Peculiar Peril	Jeff VanderMeer	Farrar, Straus and Giroux	
2021	The Scapegracers	Hannah Abigail Clarke	Erewhon	
2021	The Tinderbox: Soldier of Indira	Lou Diamond Phillips	Aethon Books	
2022	A Dark and Starless Forest *	Sarah Hollowell	Clarion Books	
2022	Gallant	V. E. Schwab	Greenwillow Books	
2022	Akata Woman	Nnedi Okorafor	Viking Books for Young Readers	
2022	A Snake Falls to Earth	Darcie Little Badger	Levine Querido	
2022	Redemptor	Jordan Ifueko	Abrams Books	
2022	Iron Widow	Xiran Jay Zhao	Penguin Teen	
2023	The Golden Enclaves *	Naomi Novik	Del Ray	
2023	The Scratch Daughters	H. A. Clarke	Self-Published	
2023	Rust in the Root	Justina Ireland	Balzer + Brey	
2023	Academy Arcanist	Shami Stovall	Capital Station Books	
2023	Foul Lady Fortune	Chloe Gong	Margaret K. McElderry Books	
2023	Bloodmarked	Tracy Deonn	Simon & Schuster	
2024	Midnight at the Houdini *	Delilah S. Dawson		
2024	Death Lord Archanist	Shami Stovall	Capital Station Books	
2024	Hideki Smith, Demon Queller	A.J. Hartley, Hisako Osako, Kuma Hartley		
2024	Home Coming in Black	J.M. Anjewierden		
2024	So Let Them Burn	Kamilah Cole		
2024	The Spirit Bares Its Teeth	Andrew Joseph White		
2025	Sunrise on the Reaping *	Suzanne Collins	Scholastic	
2025	Rest in Peaches	Alex Brown	Page Street YA	
2025	Among Serpents	Marc J Gregson	Peachtree Teen	
2025	Friends Indeed	Jane Lindskold & David Weber	Baen	
2025	Labyrinth Arcanist	Shami Stovall	Capital Station	
2025	Compound Fracture	Andrew Joseph White	Peachtree Teen	
2026	Ride or Die*	Delilah S. Dawson	Delacorte	
2026	Make Me a Monster	Kalynn Bayron	Bloomsbury YA	
2026	The Executioners Three	Susan Dennard	Tor Teen	
2026	Hazelthorn	CG Drews	Feiwel & Friends	
2026	Sky on Fire	E.K. Johnston	Dutton Books for Young Readers	
2026	Queen of Faces	Petra Lord	HarperCollins	

=== Best Military Science Fiction or Fantasy Novel ===
* Winner(s) ∞ Nomination declined

Year	Work	Author(s)	Publisher(s)	Ref.
2016	Hell's Foundations Quiver *	David Weber	Tor Books	
2016	Blood in the Water	Taylor Anderson	Roc Books	
2016	Chains of Command	Marko Kloos	47North	
2016	Fallen	Amy J. Murphy	self-published	
2016	The Price of Valor	Django Wexler	Roc Books	
2016	Wrath of an Angry God	Gibson Michaels	Arc Flash Publishing	
2016	~~The End of All Things~~ ∞	~~John Scalzi~~	~~Tor Books~~	
2017	Iron Dragoons *	Richard Fox	Triplane Press	
2017	Caine's Mutiny	Charles E. Gannon	Baen Books	
2017	Cartwright's Cavaliers	Mark Wandrey	Seventh Seal Press	
2017	Exiles	Amy J. Murphy	self-published	
2017	Rescue Run	Jon Del Arroz	Evil Girlfriend Media	
2017	Resistance	J. F. Holmes	self-published	
2017	The Span of Empire	Eric Flint, David Carrico	Baen Books	
2017	Starship Liberator	David VanDyke, B. V. Larson	Castalia House	
2018	A Call to Vengeance *	Timothy Zahn, David Weber, and Thomas Pope	Baen Books	
2018	Communication Failure	Joe Zieja	Saga Press	
2018	Ghost Marines Book One: Integration	Jonathan P. Brazee	Semper Fi Press	
2018	Legend	Christopher Woods	Seventh Seal Press	
2018	Points of Impact	Marko Kloos	47North	
2018	Price of Freedom	Craig Martelle and Michael Anderle	LMBPN Publishing	
2019	Uncompromising Honor *	David Weber	Baen Books	
2019	The Light Brigade	Kameron Hurley	Saga Press	
2019	Marine	Joshua Dalzelle	self-published	
2019	Order of the Centurion	Jason Anspach and Nick Cole	Galaxy's Edge	
2019	A Pale Dawn	Chris Kennedy and Mark Wandrey	Seventh Seal Press	
2019	Sons of the Lion	Jason Cordova	Seventh Seal Press	
2020	Savage Wars*	Jason Anspach, Nick Cole	Galaxy's Edge Press	
2020	Aftershocks	Marko Kloos	47North	
2020	Defiance	Bear Ross	Self-published	
2020	Edge of Valor	Josh Hayes	Aethon Books	
2020	Howling Dark	Christopher Ruocchio	DAW	
2020	System Failure	Joe Zieja	Gallery / Saga Press	
2021	Gun Runner *	Larry Correia, John D. Brown	Baen	
2021	Demon in White	Christopher Ruocchio	DAW	
2021	Direct Fire	Rick Partlow	Self-published	
2021	Fleet Elements	Walter Jon Williams	Harper Voyager	
2021	Orders of Battle	Marko Kloos	47North	
2021	Sentenced to War	J.N. Chaney, Jonathan Brazee	Self-published	
2022	A Call to Insurrection *	David Weber, Timothy Zahn, & Thomas Pope	Baen	
2022	The Shattered Skies	John Birmingham	Del Rey	
2022	Resolute	Jack Campbell	Ace	
2022	Backyard Starship	J. N. Chaney & Terry Maggert	Self published	
2022	Against All Odds	Jeffery H. Haskell	Aethon Books	
2022	Citadel	Marko Kloos	47North	

The category "Best Military Science Fiction or Fantasy Novel" was removed from the awards in 2023.

=== Best Alternate History Novel ===
* Winner(s)

Year	Work	Author(s)	Publisher(s)	Ref.
2016	League of Dragons *	Naomi Novik	Del Rey Books	
2016	1635: A Parcel of Rogues	Eric Flint; Andrew Dennis	Baen Books	
2016	1636: The Cardinal Virtues	Eric Flint; Walter H. Hunt	Baen Books	
2016	Bombs Away	Harry Turtledove	Del Rey Books	
2016	Germanica	Robert Conroy	Baen Books	
2016	Ghostwalkers	Jonathan Maberry	Tor Books	
2017	Fallout *	Harry Turtledove	Del Rey Books	
2017	1636: The Ottoman Onslaught	Eric Flint	Baen Books	
2017	Another Girl, Another Planet	Lou Antonelli	WordFire Press	
2017	Breath of Earth	Beth Cato	Harper Voyager	
2017	A Change in Crime	D. R. Perry	self-published	
2017	The Last Days of New Paris	China Miéville	Del Rey	
2017	No Gods, Only Daimons	Kai Wai Cheah	Castalia House	
2017	Witchy Eye	D. J. Butler	Baen Books	
2018	Uncharted *	Kevin J. Anderson and Sarah A. Hoyt	Baen Books	
2018	Dark State	Charles Stross	Tor Books	
2018	The Dream of the Iron Dragon	Robert Kroese	self-published	
2018	Minds of Men	Kacey Ezell	Theogony Books	
2018	The Sea Peoples	S. M. Stirling	Ace Books	
2018	Witchy Winter	D. J. Butler	Baen Books	
2019	Black Chamber *	S. M. Stirling	Ace Books	
2019	The Calculating Stars	Mary Robinette Kowal	Tor Books	
2019	The Iron Codex	David Alan Mack	Tor Books	
2019	Machines Like Me	Ian McEwan	Doubleday	
2019	Unholy Land	Lavie Tidhar	Tachyon Publications	
2019	The World Asunder	Kacey Ezell	Theogony Books	
2020	Witchy Kingdom *	D. J. Butler	Baen	
2020	As Our World Ends	Jack Hunt	Self-published	
2020	The Girl with No Face	M. H. Boroson	Talos	
2020	A Nation Interrupted	Kevin McDonald	Braveship Books	
2020	Revolution	W. L. Goodwater	Ace	
2020	Up-time Pride and Down-time Prejudice	Mark H. Huston	Ring of Fire Press	
2021	1637: No Peace Beyond the Line *	Eric Flint, Charles E. Gannon	Baen	
2021	Axiom's End	Lindsay Ellis	St. Martin's Griffin	
2021	Daggers in Darkness	S. M. Stirling	Ring of Fire Press	
2021	A Master of Djinn	P. Djèlí Clark	Tor Books	
2021	The Relentless Moon	Mary Robinette Kowal	Tor Books	
2021	The Russian Cage	Charlaine Harris	Saga Press	
2022	The Silver Bullets of Annie Oakley *	Mercedes Lackey	DAW Books	
2022	When Women Were Dragons	Kelly Barnhill	Doubleday	
2022	She Who Became the Sun	Shelley Parker-Chan	Tor Books	
2022	The King's Daughter	Vonda N. McIntyre	Open Road Media	
2022	1637: Dr. Gribbleflotz and the Soul of Stoner	Kerryn Offord & Rick Boatright	Baen Books	
2022	Invisible Sun	Charles Stross	Tor Books	
2023	Lost in Time *	A. G. Riddle	Head of Zeus	
2023	Hidden Voices	Dan Willis	Runeblade Entertainment	
2023	Halcyon	Elliot Ackerman	Knopf	
2023	The Mother	B. L. Blanchard	47North	
2023	The Revolutionary War	Christopher G. Nutall	Elsewhen Press	
2024	All the Dead Shall Weep *	Charlaine Harris	Saga Press	
2024	1638: The Sovereign States	Eric Flint, Paula Goodlett, & Gorg Huff	Baen Books	
2024	Cahokia Jazz	Francis Spufford	Faber & Faber	
2024	Dirty Water	Tom Kratman	Baen Books	
2024	Devil's Battle	Taylor Anderson	Roc Books	
2024	The Wages of Sin	Harry Turtledove	Del Rey Books	
2025	The Martian Contingency *	Mary Robinette Kowal	Tor	
2025	Gold, Gangs, and Glory	Laurence Dahners	self-published	
2025	1919: The Romanov Rising	Kacey Ezell, Tom Kratman & Justin Watson	Baen	
2025	1635: The Weaver's Code	Eric Flint & Jody Lynn Nye	Baen	
2025	To Turn the Tide	S.M. Stirling	Baen	
2025	Gangster	Dan Willis	self-published	
2026	The Winds of Fate*	S.M. Stirling	Baen	
2026	World War 3.2	John Birmingham	Gigantic Bombs	
2026	No Man’s Land	Richard K. Morgan	Del Rey	
2026	A Resistance of Witches	Morgan Ryan	Viking	
2026	The Unnecessary War	Brian C. Thompson	self-published	
2026	Powerless	Harry Turtledove	Caezik	

=== Best Apocalyptic Novel ===
* Winner(s) ∞ The Obelisk Gate was removed from the final ballot at the authors request

Year	Work	Author(s)	Publisher(s)	Ref.
2016	Ctrl Alt Revolt! *	Nick Cole	self-published	
2016	A Time to Die	Mark Wandrey	Henchman Press	
2016	Chasing Freedom	Marina Fontaine	self-published	
2016	Dark Age	Felix O. Hartmann	Hartmann Publishing	
2016	The Desert and the Blade	S. M. Stirling	Roc Books	
2016	The Fifth Season	N. K. Jemisin	Orbit Books	
2017	Walkaway *	Cory Doctorow	Tor Books	
2017	American War	Omar El Akkad	Alfred A. Knopf	
2017	Codename: UnSub	Declan Finn, A. Yoskowitz	self-published	
2017	Falling	J. F. Holmes	self-published	
2017	The Place Outside the Wild	Daniel Humphreys	self-published	
2017	The Seventh Age: Dawn	Rick Heinz	Inkshares	
2017	The Obelisk Gate ∞	N. K. Jemisin	Orbit Books	

The category "Best Apocalyptic Novel" was removed from the awards in 2018.

=== Best Media Tie-In Novel ===
* Winner(s)

Year	Work	Author(s)	Publisher(s)	Ref.
2018	Star Wars: Leia: Princess of Alderaan *	Claudia Gray	Disney-Lucasfilm	
2018	World of Warcraft: Before the Storm	Christie Golden	Del Rey	
2018	Star Trek: Discovery: Desperate Hours	David Mack	Pocket Books	
2018	Star Trek: Discovery: Fear Itself	James Swallow	Pocket Books	
2018	Halo: Legacy of Onyx	Matt Forbeck	Gallery Books	
2018	Star Wars: Phasma	Delilah S. Dawson	Del Rey	
2019	Star Wars: Thrawn: Alliances *	Timothy Zahn	Del Rey	
2019	Firefly: Big Damn Hero	James Lovegrove and Nancy Holder	Titan Books	
2019	Stranger Things: Darkness on the Edge of Town	Adam Christopher	Del Rey	
2019	Star Wars: Master & Apprentice	Claudia Gray	Del Rey	
2019	The Replicant War (Worlds at War Saga)	Chris Kennedy	Anticipation Press	
2019	Star Trek: Discovery: The Way to the Stars	Una McCormack	Gallery Books	
2020	Firefly: The Ghost Machine *	James Lovegrove	Titan Books	
2020	Star Trek: Picard: The Last Best Hope	Una McCormack	Pocket Books	
2020	Star Trek: Discovery: The Enterprise War	John Jackson Miller	Pocket Books	
2020	Star Wars: Resistance Reborn	Rebecca Roanhorse	Del Rey	
2020	Aliens: Phalanx	Scott Sigler	Titan Books	
2021	Firefly: Generations *	Tim Lebbon	Titan Books	
2021	MacGyver: Meltdown	Eric Kelley, Lee Zlotoff	Prince of Cats Literary Productions	
2021	Shadows Rising (World of Warcraft: Shadowlands)	Madeleine Roux	Del Rey	
2021	Star Wars: Light of the Jedi	Charles Soule	Del Rey	
2021	Warhammer 40,000: Penitent	Dan Abnett	Games Workshop	
2021	Star Wars: Thrawn Ascendancy	Timothy Zahn	Del Rey	
2022	Star Wars: Thrawn Ascendancy: Lesser Evil *	Timothy Zahn	Del Rey	
2022	Star Wars: The Fallen Star	Claudia Gray	Del Rey	
2022	Star Trek: Coda: Oblivion’s Gate	David Mack	Simon & Schuster	
2022	Star Trek: Picard: Rogue Elements	John Jackson Miller	Simon & Schuster	
2022	Halo: Divine Wind	Troy Denning	Gallery Books	

The category "Best Media Tie-In Novel" was introduced in 2018 and removed from the awards in 2023.

=== Best Horror Novel ===
* Winner(s) ∞ Nomination declined

Year	Work	Author(s)	Publisher(s)	Ref.
2016	Souldancer *	Brian Niemeier	self-published	
2016	Alice	Christina Henry	Ace Books	
2016	An Unattractive Vampire	Jim McDoniel	Sword & Laser	
2016	Chapelwood	Cherie Priest	Roc Books	
2016	Disappearance at Devil's Rock	Paul G. Tremblay	William Morrow/HarperCollins	
2016	Honor at Stake	Declan Finn	self-published	
2017	The Changeling *	Victor LaValle	Spiegel & Grau	
2017	The Bleak December	Kevin G. Summers	Wonderment Media	
2017	Blood of Invidia	Tom Tinney, Morgen Batten	PiR8 Productions	
2017	Donn's Hill	Caryn Larrinaga	Immortal Works	
2017	A God in the Shed	J-F. Dubeau	Inkshares	
2017	The Hidden People ∞	Alison Littlewood	Jo Fletcher Books	
2017	Live and Let Bite	Declan Finn	self-published	
2017	Nothing Left to Lose	Dan Wells	Tor Books	
2018	Sleeping Beauties *	Stephen King and Owen King	Scribner	
2018	Beneath the Lighthouse	Julieanne Lynch	Vesuvian Books	
2018	The Cabin at the End of the World	Paul G. Tremblay	Morrow	
2018	Glimpse	Jonathan Maberry	St. Martin's Press	
2018	Meddling Kids	Edgar Cantero	Doubleday	
2018	A Time to Run	Mark Wandrey	Blood Moon Press	
2019	Little Darlings *	Melanie Golding	Crooked Lane Books	
2019	100 Fathoms Below	Steven L. Kent and Nicholas Kaufmann	Blackstone Publishing	
2019	Cardinal Black	Robert R. McCammon	Cemetery Dance Publications	
2019	Riddance	Shelley Jackson	Black Balloon Publishing	
2019	We Sold Our Souls	Grady Hendrix	Quirk Books	
2019	Zombie Airman	David Guenther	self-published	
2020	The Twisted Ones *	T. Kingfisher	Gallery / Saga Press	
2020	Imaginary Friend	Stephen Chbosky	Grand Central Publishing	
2020	The Pursuit of William Abbey	Claire North	Orbit	
2020	Scavenger Hunt	Michaelbrent Collings	Self-published	
2020	The Toll	Cherie Priest	Tor Books	
2021	The Hollow Places *	T. Kingfisher	Gallery / Saga Press	
2021	The Only Good Indians	Stephen Graham Jones	Saga Press	
2021	Survivor Song	Paul G. Tremblay	William Morrow	
2021	Synchronicity	Michaelbrent Collings	Self-published	
2021	The Taxidermist's Lover	Polly Hall	Camcat Publishing, LLC	
2021	True Story	Kate Reed Petty	Penguin Books	
2022	The Book of Accidents *	Chuck Wendig	Random House	
2022	The Final Girl Support Group	Grady Hendrix	Berkley Books	
2022	The Death of Jane Lawrence	Caitlin Starling	Macmillan	
2022	My Heart Is a Chainsaw	Stephen Graham Jones	Gallery/Saga Press	
2022	Hide	Kiersten White	Penguin Random House	
2022	Revelator	Daryl Gregory	Knopf Publishing	
2023	A House with Good Bones *	T. Kingfisher	Tor Nightfire	
2023	The Devil Takes You Home	Gabino Iglesias	Mulholland Books	
2023	Reluctant Immortals	Gwendolyn Kiste	Simon& Schuster	
2023	No Gods for Drowning	Hailey Piper	Polis Books	
2023	The Pallbearers Club	Paul G. Tremblay	William Morrow Paperbacks	
2023	The Only One Left	Riley Sager	Dutton	
2024	Black River Orchid *	Chuck Wendig		
2024	Dead Storm Rising	Shane Gries		
2024	Double Dose	Paul Wilson		
2024	The Dead Take a Train	Richard Kadrey, Cassandra Khaw		
2024	The Hollow Dead	Darcy Coates		
2024	The Reformatory	Tananarive Due		
2025	Bury Your Gays *	Chuck Tingle	Tor Nightfire	
2025	Cold Eternity	S. A. Barnes	Tor Nightfire	
2025	The Vengeful Dead	Darcy Coates	Poisoned Pen	
2025	It Will Only Hurt for a Moment	Delilah S. Dawson	Del Rey	
2025	The Buffalo Hunter Hunter	Stephen Graham Jones	Saga	
2025	The Wilding	Ian McDonald	Gollancz	
2026	King Sorrow	Joe Hill	Morrow; Headline UK	
2026	The Possession of Alba Díaz	Isabel Cañas	Berkley; Solaris UK	
2026	Play Nice	Rachel Harrison	Berkley	
2026	The Bewitching	Silvia Moreno-Garcia	Del Rey; Arcadia UK	
2026	Girl in the Creek	Wendy N. Wagner	Tor Nightfire	

== Visual media ==
=== Best Illustrative Book Cover ===
* Winner(s)

Year	Illustrator	Book	Ref.
2023	Kurt Miller *	Tower of Silence by Larry Correia (Baen)	
2023	Kieran Yanner	Ashes of Man by Christopher Ruocchio (DAW)	
2023	Cedar Sanderson	edited and art by for But Not Broken (self-published)	
2023	Sam Shearon	River of Ashes by Alexandrea Weis (Vesuvian)	
2023	Jackson Tjota	Titan Mage: Apocalypse by Edie Skye (Spice Rack)	
2023	Jeff Brown	Wraithbound by Tim Akers (Baen)	
2024	Kelly Chong *	Of Jade and Dragons by Amber Chen (Viking)	
2024	Sam R. Kennedy	Beyond Enemies by Marisa Wolf (Baen)	
2024	Justin Adams	Dragonesque by S. C. Butler & Joshua Palmatier, eds. (Zombies Need Brains)	
2024	Jeff Brown	The Silverblood Promise by James Logan (Tor)	
2024	Aliya Chen	Yumi and the Nightmare Painter by Brandon Sanderson (Tor)	
2025	Michael Whelan *	Wind and Truth by Brandon Sanderson (Tor)	
2025	Pierluigi Abbondanza	Rise From Ruin by Melissa Olthoff (Baen)	
2025	Jeff Brown	Flames of Gold by Liz Delton (Tourmaline & Quartz)	
2025	Sam Kennedy	Blood of Her Father by Kacey Ezell & Marisa Wolf (Theogony)	
2025	Kurt Miller	Mountain of Fire by Jason Cordova (Banen)	
2025	Dave Seeley	The Icarus Coda by Timothy Zahn (Baen)	
2026	T. Kingfisher*	Hemlock & Silver by T. Kingfisher (Tor; Tor UK)	
2026	Jeff Brown	The Sapphire Heart by Abigail Bender, Victoria Hungria & Sandra Mead Miller (Three Scribes)	
2026	Dominic Harman	The Ishtar Deception by James L. Cambias (Baen)	
2026	Carson Lowmiller	Brigands & Breadknives by Travis Baldree (Tor)	
2026	Anna Moshak	The Second Death of Locke by V.L. Bovalino (Forever)	
2026	Joe Wilson	Pretenders to the Throne of God by Adrian Tchaikovsky (Head of Zeus)	

The category "Best Illustrative Book Cover" was first introduced in 2023.

=== Best Comic Book ===
* Winner(s)

Year	Work	Author(s)/ Artist(s)	Publisher(s)	Ref.
2016	Ms. Marvel *	Sana Amanat, Stephen Wacker, G. Willow Wilson, Adrian Alphona	Marvel Comics	
2016	Astro City	Kurt Busiek, Brent Anderson, Alex Ross	Vertigo Comics	
2016	Civil War II	Brian Michael Bendis, David Marquez, Justin Ponsor	Marvel Comics	
2016	Daredevil	Charles Soule, Ron Garney	Marvel Comics	
2016	DC Universe: Rebirth	various	DC Comics	
2016	Providence	Alan Moore, Jacen Burrows	Avatar Press	
2016	Saga	Brian K. Vaughan, Fiona Staples	Image Comics	
2017	The Dresden Files: Dog Men *	Jim Butcher, Mark Powers	Dynamite Entertainment	
2017	Buffy the Vampire Slayer Season Eleven	Christos Gage, Rebekah Isaacs, Georges Jeanty, Megan Levens	Dark Horse Comics	
2017	Monstress	Marjorie Liu, Sana Takeda	Image Comics	
2017	Motor Girl	Terry Moore	Abstract Studio	
2017	Ms. Marvel	Sana Amanat, Stephen Wacker, G. Willow Wilson, Adrian Alphona	Marvel Comics	
2017	Saga	Brian K. Vaughan, Fiona Staples	Image Comics	
2017	Wynonna Earp Legends	Beau Smith, Tim Rozon, Chris Evenhuis, Jay Fotos	IDW Publishing	
2018	Mighty Thor *	Jason Aaron and Russell Dauterman	Marvel Comics	
2018	Aliens: Dead Orbit	James Stokoe	Dark Horse Comics	
2018	Doomsday Clock	Geoff Johns and Gary Frank	DC Comics	
2018	Mister Miracle	Tom King and Mitch Gerads	DC Comics	
2018	Saga	Brian K. Vaughan and Fiona Staples	Image Comics	
2018	Star Wars: Darth Vader	Charles D. Soule and Giuseppe Camuncoli	Marvel Comics	
2019	Saga *	Brian K. Vaughan, Fiona Staples	Image Comics	
2019	Batman	Tom King, Tony Daniel	DC Comics	
2019	The Batman Who Laughs	Scott Snyder, Jock (cartoonist)	DC Comics	
2019	Black Hammer	Jeff Lemire, Dean Ormston, Dave Stewart (artist)	DC Comics	
2019	Mister Miracle	Tom King, Tony Daniel	DC Comics	
2019	Peter Parker: The Spectacular Spider-Man	Chip Zdarsky, Adam Kubert	Marvel Comics	
2020	Avengers *	Jason Aaron, Ed McGuinness	Marvel Comics	
2020	Bitter Root	David F. Walker, Chuck Brown, Sanford Greene	Image Comics	
2020	Immortal Hulk	Al Ewing, Joe Bennett	Marvel Comics	
2020	Monstress	Marjorie Liu, Sana Takeda	Image Comics	
2020	Spider-Woman	Karla Pacheco, Pere Pérez, Paulo Siqueira	Marvel Comics	
2020	Undiscovered Country	Charles Soule, Scott Snyder, Daniele Orlandini, Giuseppe Camuncoli, Matt D. Wilson	Image Comics	
2021	X-Men *	Jonathan Hickman, Mahmud Asrar	Marvel Comics	
2021	Daredevil	Chip Zdarsky, Marco Checchetto	Marvel Comics	
2021	Immortal Hulk	Al Ewing, Joe Bennett	Marvel Comics	
2021	Invisible Kingdom	G Willow Wilson, Christian Ward	Berger Books	
2021	Monstress	Marjorie Liu, Sana Takeda	Image Comics	
2021	Once & Future	Kieron Gillen, Dan Mora	Boom! Studios	
2022	Immortal X-Men *	Kieron Gillen, Mark Brooks	Marvel Comics	
2022	Devil’s Reign	Chip Zdarsky, Marco Checchetto	Marvel Comics	
2022	King Conan	Jason Aaron, Mahmud Asrar	Marvel Comics	
2022	Step by Bloody Step	G Simon Spurrier, Matías Bergara	Image Comics	
2022	Twig	Skottie Young, Kyle Strahm	Image Comics	
2022	Nightwing	Tom Taylor, Bruno Redondo	DC Comics	

The categories "Best Comic Book" and "Best Graphic Novel" were combined into a single category in 2023.

=== Best Graphic Novel ===
* Winner(s)

Year	Work	Author(s)/ Artist(s)	Publisher(s)	Ref.
2016	The Sandman: Overture *	Neil Gaiman, J. H. Williams III	Vertigo Comics	
2016	Chicago	Glenn Head	Fantagraphics Books	
2016	Killing and Dying	Adrian Tomine	Drawn & Quarterly	
2016	March: Book Two	John Lewis, Andrew Aydin, Nate Powell	Top Shelf Productions	
2016	Sacred Heart	Liz Suburbia	Fantagraphics Books	
2016	Virgil	Steve Orlando, J. D. Faith	Image Comics	
2017	The Dresden Files: Wild Card *	Jim Butcher, Carlos Gomez	Dynamite Entertainment	
2017	Clive Barker's Nightbreed Volume Three	Marc Andreyko, Clive Barker, Emmanuel Xerx Javier	Boom! Studios	
2017	Girl Genius: The Second Journey of Agatha Heterodyne, Book 2: The City of Lightning	Phil Foglio, Kaja Foglio	Studio Foglio	
2017	Love Is Love	various	IDW Publishing	
2017	March: Book Three	John Lewis, Andrew Aydin, Nate Powell	Top Shelf Productions	
2017	My Favorite Thing Is Monsters	Emil Ferris	Fantagraphics Books	
2017	Stuck in My Head	J. R. Mounts	self-published	
2018	White Sand, Volume 1 *	Brandon Sanderson, Rik Hoskin and Julius M. Gopez	Dynamite Entertainment	
2018	Be Prepared	Vera Brosgol	First Second	
2018	Chicago Typewriter: The Red Ribbon	Brandon Fiadino, Djibril Morissette-Phan and James Greatorex	Dark Legion	
2018	Monstress Volume Two: The Blood	Marjorie Liu and Sana Takeda	Image Comics	
2018	Paper Girls: Volume 4	Brian K. Vaughan and Cliff Chiang	Image Comics	
2018	The Vision	Tom King and Gabriel Hernandez Walta	Marvel Comics	
2019	X-Men: Grand Design – Second Genesis *	Ed Piskor	Marvel Comics	
2019	Berlin	Jason Lutes	Drawn and Quarterly	
2019	Hey, Kiddo	Jarret J. Krosoczka	Graphix	
2019	I Am Young	M. Dean	Fantagraphics	
2019	Monstress Vol. 3	Marjorie Liu, Sana Takeda	Image Comics	
2019	On a Sunbeam	Tillie Walden	First Second	
2020	Battlestar Galactica Counterstrike *	John Jackson Miller, Daniel HDR	Dynamite Entertainment	
2020	Batman Universe	Brian Michael Bendis, Nick Derington	DC Comics	
2020	Black Bolt	Christian Ward, Frazier Irving, Stephanie Hans	Marvel Comics	
2020	Dragon Hoops	Gene Luen Yang	First Second	
2020	Mister Miracle	Tom King, Mitch Gerads	DC Comics	
2020	Something is Killing the Children Vol. 1	James Tynion IV, Werther Dell'Edera	Boom! Studios	
2021	The Magicians: New Class *	Lev Grossman, Lilah Sturges, Pius Bak	Archaia	
2021	The Book Tour	Andi Watson	Top Shelf Productions	
2021	Dracula, Motherf**ker	Alex de Campi, Erica Henderson	Image Comics	
2021	The Green Lantern Season Two	Grant Morrison, Liam Sharp	DC Comics	
2021	The Magic Fish	Trung Le Nguyen	Random House Graphic	
2021	Pulp	Ed Brubaker, Sean Phillips, Jacob Phillips	Image Comics	
2022	Dune: House Atreides Volume 2 *	Brian Herbert, Kevin J. Anderson, Dev Pramanik	Boom! Studios	
2022	Geiger	Geoff Johns, Gary Frank	Image Comics	
2022	Bitter Root Volume 3	David F. Walker, Chuck Brown, Sanford Greene, Sofie Dodgson	Image Comics	
2022	Wonder Woman Historia: The Amazons	Kelly Sue DeConnick, Phil Jimenez	DC Comics	
2022	Monstress, Volume 6: The Vow	Marjorie Liu, Sana Takeda	Image Comics	
2022	Saga	Brian K. Vaughan, Fiona Staples	Image Comics	

The categories "Best Comic Book" and "Best Graphic Novel" were combined into a single category in 2023.

=== Best Comic Book / Graphic Novel ===
* Winner(s)

Year	Work	Author(s)/ Artist(s)	Publisher(s)	Ref.
2023	Dune: House Harkonnen *	Brian Herbert, Kevin J. Anderson, Michael Shelfer	Boom! Studios	
2023	Kaya	Wes Craig	Image Comics	
2023	Dawn of DC: Green Arrow	Joshua Williamson, Sean Izaakse	DC Comics	
2023	Wolverine	Benjamin Percy, Juan José Ryp	Marvel Comics	
2023	X-Men	Gerry Duggan, Joshua Cassara	Marvel Comics	
2023	Night Fever	Ed Brubaker, Sean Philips, Jacob Phillips	Image Comics	
2024	Monstress *	Marjorie Liu, Sana Takeda	Image Comics	
2024	Batman	Chip Zdarsky, Jorge Jimenez	DC Comics	
2024	Canary	Scott Snyder, Dan Panosian	Dark Horse Comics	
2024	Nightwing	Tom Taylor, Bruno Redondo	DC Comics	
2024	Wonder Woman	Tom King, Daniel Sampere	DC Comics	
2024	X-Men: Forever	Kieron Gillen, Luca Maresca	Marvel Comics	
2025	Daredevil: Cold Day In Hell*	Charles Soule, illustrated by Steve McNiven	Marvel Comics	
2025	Absolute Superman	Jason Aaron, illustrated by Rafa Sandoval	DC Comics	
2025	Ultimate Wolverine	Christopher Condon, illustrated by Alessandro Cappuccio	Ultimate Universe	
2025	Ultimate Spider-Man Volume 2: The Paper	Jonathan Hickman, illustrated by Marco Checchetto & David Messina	Ultimate Universe	
2025	Transformers Volume 3: Combiner Chaos	Daniel Warren Johnson, illustrated by Jorge Corona	Image Comics	
2025	Absolute Batman	Scott Snyder, illustrated by Nick Dragotta	DC Comics	
2026	Something is Killing the Children*	James Tynion IV, illustrated by Werther Dell’Edera		
2026	Absolute Superman	Jason Aaron, illustrated by Rafa Sandoval		
2026	X-Men: Elsewhen	John Byrne		
2026	Daredevil	Stephanie Phillips, illustrated by Lee Garbett		
2026	Absolute Batman	Scott Snyder, illustrated by Nick Dragotta		
2026	Absolute Wonder Woman	Kelly Thompson, illustrated by Hayden Sherman		

== Television and Film ==
=== Best Science Fiction or Fantasy TV Series ===
* Winner(s)

Year	Work	Creator(s)	Released on	Ref.
2016	Game of Thrones *	David Benioff, D. B. Weiss	HBO	
2016	Daredevil	Drew Goddard	Netflix	
2016	Doctor Who	Steven Moffat	BBC One	
2016	The Expanse	Mark Fergus and Hawk Ostby	Syfy	
2016	The Flash	Greg Berlanti, Andrew Kreisberg, Geoff Johns	The CW	
2016	Jessica Jones	Melissa Rosenberg	Netflix	
2016	Outlander	Ronald D. Moore	Starz	
2017	Stranger Things *	The Duffer Brothers	Netflix	
2017	Agents of S.H.I.E.L.D.	Joss Whedon, Jed Whedon, Maurissa Tancharoen, Stan Lee, Jack Kirby	ABC	
2017	Doctor Who	Steven Moffat	BBC One	
2017	The Expanse	Mark Fergus and Hawk Ostby	Syfy	
2017	Lucifer	Ildy Modrovich, Jerry Bruckheimer, Jonathan Littman and KristieAnne Reed	Fox	
2017	Stan Lee's Lucky Man	Stan Lee, Neil Biswas	Sky 1	
2017	Westworld	Jonathan Nolan, Lisa Joy, Michael Crichton	HBO	
2017	Wynonna Earp	Emily Andras, Beau Smith	Syfy	
2018	Game of Thrones *	David Benioff, D. B. Weiss	HBO	
2018	Altered Carbon	Laeta Kalogridis	Netflix	
2018	The Expanse	Mark Fergus and Hawk Ostby	Syfy	
2018	Lucifer	Tom Kapinos	Fox	
2018	Star Trek: Discovery	Bryan Fuller and Alex Kurtzman	CBS All Access	
2018	Stranger Things	The Duffer Brothers	Netflix	
2018	Supernatural	Andrew Dabb, Robert Singer	The CW	
2019	Good Omens *	Neil Gaiman, Caroline Skinner, Chris Sussman, Rob Wilkins and Rod Brown	Amazon	
2019	Game of Thrones	David Benioff, D. B. Weiss	HBO	
2019	Lucifer	Ildy Modrovich, Jerry Bruckheimer, Jonathan Littman and KristieAnne Reed	Fox	
2019	The Orville	André Bormanis, David A. Goodman, Seth MacFarlane and Brannon Braga	Fox	
2019	Star Trek: Discovery	Bryan Fuller and Alex Kurtzman	CBS All Access	
2019	The Umbrella Academy	Steve Blackman	Netflix	
2020	The Mandalorian *	Jon Favreau	Disney+	
2020	Altered Carbon	Laeta Kalogridis	Netflix	
2020	The Expanse	Mark Fergus and Hawk Ostby	Amazon Prime	
2020	Lost In Space	Zack Estrin	Netflix	
2020	Star Trek: Picard	Akiva Goldsman, Michael Chabon, Kirsten Beyer, Alex Kurtzman	CBS All Access	
2020	Watchmen	Damon Lindelof	HBO	
2020	The Witcher	Lauren Schmidt Hissrich	Netflix	
2021	The Expanse *	Mark Fergus and Hawk Ostby	Amazon Prime	
2021	Loki	Michael Waldron	Disney+	
2021	The Nevers	Joss Whedon	HBO	
2021	Resident Alien	Chris Sheridan	SYFY	
2021	Shadow and Bone	Eric Heisserer	Netflix	
2021	Star Trek: Discovery	Bryan Fuller, Alex Kurtzman	Paramount+	
2021	WandaVision	Jac Schaeffer	Disney+	
2022	Stranger Things *	The Duffer Brothers	Netflix	
2022	The Expanse	Mark Fergus and Hawk Ostby, James S. A. Corey	Amazon	
2022	Star Trek: Strange New Worlds	Akiva Goldsman, Alex Kurtzman, Jenny Lumet	Paramount+	
2022	Wheel of Time	Rafe Judkins	Amazon	
2022	For All Mankind	Ronald D. Moore, Matt Wolpert, Ben Nedivi	Apple TV+	
2022	Halo	Kyle Killen, Steven Kane	Paramount+	
2022	The Boys	Eric Kripke, Garth Ennis, Darick Robertson	Amazon	
2023	The Sandman *	Neil Gaiman, Allan Heinberg, David S. Goyer, Mike Barker	Netflix	
2023	Andor	Tony Gilroy	Disney+	
2023	Star Trek: Strange New Worlds	Alex Kurtzman, Akiva Goldsman, Jenny Lumet	Paramount+	
2023	The Mandalorian	Jon Favreau	Disney+	
2023	Star Trek: Picard	Alex Kurtzman, Michael Chabon, Akiva Goldsman, Kirsten Beyer	Paramount+	
2023	House of the Dragon	George R. R. Martin, Ryan Condal	HBO	
2024	Fallout *		Amazon Prime Video	
2024	3 Body Problem		Netflix	
2024	Ahsoka		Disney+	
2024	For All Mankind		Apple TV+	
2024	Good Omens		Amazon Prime Video	
2024	House of the Dragon		HBO	
2024	Loki		Disney+	
2024	Monarch: Legacy of Monsters		Apple TV+	
2024	Star Trek: Strange New Worlds		Paramount +	
2025	Andor *		Disney+	
2025	Murderbot		Apple TV+	
2025	Severance		Apple TV+	
2025	Silo		Apple TV+	
2025	The Lord of the Rings: The Rings of Power		Amazon Prime	
2025	The Wheel of Time		Amazon Prime	
2026	A Knight of the Seven Kingdoms			
2026	Alien: Earth			
2026	The Boys Season 5			
2026	Fallout Season 2			
2026	Foundation Season 3			
2026	Plur1bus			
2026	Strange New Worlds Season 3			
2026	Widow’s Bay			

=== Best Science Fiction or Fantasy Movie ===
* Winner(s)

Year	Work	Creator(s)	Studio	Ref.
2016	The Martian *	Ridley Scott (director), Drew Goddard (writer)	Scott Free Productions, Kinberg Genre	
2016	Ant-Man	Peyton Reed (director), Edgar Wright (writer), Joe Cornish (writer), Adam McKay (writer), Paul Rudd (writer)	Marvel Studios	
2016	Captain America: Civil War	Anthony Russo (director), Joe Russo (director), Christopher Markus (writer), Stephen McFeely (writer)	Marvel Studios	
2016	Crimson Peak	Guillermo del Toro (director, writer), Matthew Robbins (writer)	Legendary Pictures, DDY Productions	
2016	Deadpool	Tim Miller, Rhett Reese (writer), Paul Wernick (writer)	Marvel Entertainment, Kinberg Genre, The Donners' Company	
2016	Star Wars: The Force Awakens	J. J. Abrams (director, writer), Lawrence Kasdan (writer), Michael Arndt (writer)	Lucasfilm Ltd., Bad Robot	
2017	Wonder Woman *	Patty Jenkins (director), Allan Heinberg (writer), Zack Snyder (writer), Jason Fuchs (writer)	RatPac-Dune Entertainment, DC Films, Tencent Pictures, Wanda Pictures, Atlas Entertainment, Cruel and Unusual Films	
2017	Arrival	Denis Villeneuve (director), Eric Heisserer (writer), Ted Chiang (writer)	FilmNation Entertainment, Lava Bear Films, 21 Laps Entertainment	
2017	Doctor Strange	Scott Derrickson (director, writer), Jon Spaihts (writer), C. Robert Cargill (writer)	Marvel Studios	
2017	Guardians of the Galaxy Vol. 2	James Gunn (director, writer), Dan Abnett (writer), Andy Lanning (writer)	Marvel Studios	
2017	Logan	James Mangold (director, writer), Scott Frank (writer), Michael Green (writer)	Marvel Entertainment, Kinberg Genre, Hutch Parker Productions, The Donners' Company	
2017	Passengers	Morten Tyldum (director), Jon Spaihts (writer)	Village Roadshow Pictures, Start Motion Pictures, Original Film, LStar Capital, Wanda Pictures, Company Films	
2017	Rogue One	Gareth Edwards (director), Chris Weitz (writer), Tony Gilroy (writer), John Knoll (writer), Gary Whitta (writer)	Lucasfilm Ltd.	
2018	Black Panther *	Ryan Coogler (director, writer), Joe Robert Cole (writer)	Marvel Studios	
2018	Avengers: Infinity War	Anthony and Joe Russo (directors), Christopher Markus and Stephen McFeely (writers)	Marvel Studios	
2018	Blade Runner 2049	Denis Villeneuve (director), Hampton Fancher (writer), Michael Green (writer)	Alcon Entertainment, Columbia Pictures, Bud Yorkin Productions, Torridon Films, 16:14 Entertainment, Scott Free Productions	
2018	Deadpool 2	David Leitch (director), Rhett Reese (writer), Paul Wernick (writer), Ryan Reynolds (writer)	Marvel Entertainment, Kinberg Genre, Maximum Effort, The Donners' Company	
2018	Incredibles 2	Brad Bird (director, writer)	Walt Disney Pictures, Pixar Animation Studios	
2018	Ready Player One	Steven Spielberg (director), Zak Penn (writer), Ernest Cline (writer)	Warner Bros. Pictures, Amblin Partners, Amblin Entertainment, Village Roadshow Pictures, De Line Pictures, Dune Entertainment, Farah Films & Management	
2018	Thor: Ragnarok	Taika Waititi (director), Eric Pearson (writer), Craig Kyle (writer), Christopher L. Yost (writer)	Marvel Studios	
2019	Avengers: Endgame *	Anthony Russo, Joe Russo (directors), Christopher Markus (writer), Stephen McFeely (writer)	Marvel Studios	
2019	Alita: Battle Angel	Robert Rodriguez (director), James Cameron (writer), Laeta Kalogridis (writer)	Twentieth Century Fox	
2019	Aquaman	James Wan (director), David Leslie Johnson-McGoldrick (writer), Will Beall (writer)	DC Entertainment	
2019	Captain Marvel	Anna Boden, Ryan Fleck (directors and writers), Geneva Robertson-Dworet (writer)	Marvel Studios	
2019	Spider-Man: Far From Home	Jon Watts (director), Chris McKenna (writer), Erik Sommers (writer)	Marvel Studios	
2019	Spider-Man: Into the Spider-verse	Bob Persichetti (director), Peter Ramsey (director), Rodney Rothman (director), Phil Lord (writer), Rodney Rothman (writer)	Sony Pictures Entertainment	
2020	Star Wars: The Rise of Skywalker *	J. J. Abrams (director)	Walt Disney Studios	
2020	Ad Astra	James Gray (director)	20th Century Fox	
2020	Fast Color	Julia Hart (director)	Lionsgate	
2020	Joker	Todd Phillips (director)	Warner Bros. Pictures	
2020	The Lion King	Jon Favreau (director)	Walt Disney Studios	
2020	Terminator: Dark Fate	Tim Miller (director)	Paramount Pictures	
2021	The Old Guard *	Gina Prince-Bythewood (director)	Netflix	
2021	Bill & Ted Face the Music	Dean Parisot (director)	United Artists	
2021	Godzilla vs. Kong	Adam Wingard (director)	Warner Bros. Pictures	
2021	Zack Snyder's Justice League (as Justice League)	Zack Snyder (director)	DC Entertainment	
2021	Space Sweepers	Jo Sung-hee (director)	VSTARZ Entertainment	
2021	Tenet	Christopher Nolan (director)	Warner Bros. Pictures	
2021	Wonder Woman 1984	Patty Jenkins (director)	DC Entertainment	
2022	Dune *	Denis Villeneuve (director)	Legendary Pictures	
2022	Spider-Man: No Way Home	Jon Watts (director)	Marvel Entertainment	
2022	Doctor Strange in the Multiverse of Madness	Sam Raimi (director)	Marvel Entertainment	
2022	Ghostbusters: Afterlife	Jason Reitman (director)	Columbia Pictures	
2022	The Adam Project	Shawn Levy (director)	Netflix	
2022	Free Guy	Shawn Levy (director)	Berlanti Productions	
2023	Dungeons & Dragons: Honor Among Thieves *			
2023	Avatar: The Way of Water	James Cameron (director)		
2023	Everything Everywhere All at Once			
2023	Guardians of the Galaxy 3	James Gunn (director)		
2023	Puss in Boots: The Last Wish	Joel Crawford (director)		
2023	Spider-Man: Across the Spider-Verse			
2024	Dune: Part Two *	Denis Villeneuve (director)		
2024	Barbie	Greta Gerwig (director)		
2024	Godzilla Minus One	Takashi Yamazaki (director)		
2024	Furiosa: A Mad Max Saga	George Miller (director)		
2024	The Hunger Games: The Ballad of Songbirds and Snakes	Francis Lawrence Paul King (Director)		
2024	Wonka	Paul King (director)		
2025	Deadpool & Wolverine *	Shawn Levy (director)		
2025	Alien: Romulus			
2025	How to Train Your Dragon			
2025	Sinners			
2025	Thunderbolts*			
2025	Wicked			
2026	Project Hail Mary			
2026	Superman			
2026	Disclosure Day			
2026	Predator: Badlands			
2026	Frankenstein			
2026	The Sheep Detectives			
2026	Star Wars: The Mandalorian and Grogu			
2026	Toy Story 5			

== Games ==
=== Best Science Fiction or Fantasy PC/Console Game ===
* Winner(s)

Year	Work	Publisher(s)	Ref.
2016	Fallout 4 *	Bethesda Softworks	
2016	Darkest Dungeon	Red Hook Studios	
2016	Metal Gear Solid V: The Phantom Pain	Konami Digital Entertainment	
2016	Overwatch	Blizzard Entertainment	
2016	Undertale	Toby Fox	
2016	XCOM 2	2k Games	
2017	The Legend of Zelda: Breath of the Wild *	Nintendo	
2017	Dishonored 2	Arkane Studios	
2017	Final Fantasy XV	Square Enix	
2017	Mass Effect: Andromeda	BioWare	
2017	NieR: Automata	PlatinumGames	
2017	Titanfall 2	Respawn Entertainment	
2018	Middle-earth: Shadow of War *	Monolith Productions	
2018	Battletech	Harebrained Schemes	
2018	Cuphead	StudioMDHR	
2018	Destiny 2	Bungie	
2018	Fortnite	Epic Games	
2018	Wolfenstein II: The New Colossus	MachineGames	
2019	Red Dead Redemption 2 *	Rockstar Games	
2019	Apex Legends	Electronic Arts	
2019	Assassin's Creed Odyssey	Ubisoft	
2019	Life Is Strange 2	Dontnod Entertainment	
2019	Outer Wilds	Mobius Digital	
2019	World of Warcraft: Battle for Azeroth	Blizzard	
2020	Star Wars Jedi: Fallen Order *	Respawn Entertainment, Electronic Arts	
2020	Borderlands 3	Gearbox Software, 2k Games	
2020	Control	Remedy Entertainment, 505 Games	
2020	Death Stranding	Kojima Productions, Sony Interactive	
2020	Gears 5	The Coalition, Xbox Game Studios	
2020	Half-Life: Alyx	Valve	
2020	The Outer Worlds	Obsidian Entertainment, Private Division	
2021	Assassin's Creed Valhalla *	Ubisoft	
2021	Crusader Kings III	Paradox Interactive	
2021	Cyberpunk 2077	CD Projekt	
2021	Ghost of Tsushima	Sony Interactive Entertainment	
2021	Hades	Supergiant Games	
2021	Star Wars: Squadrons	Electronic Arts	
2022	Elden Ring *	Bandai Namco Entertainment	
2022	Metroid Dread	Nintendo	
2022	Destiny 2: The Witch Queen	Bungie	
2022	Age of Empires IV	Xbox Game Studios	
2022	Lost Ark	Amazon Games	
2022	Warhammer 40,000: Chaos Gate - Daemonhunters	Frontier Foundry	

The categories "Best Science Fiction or Fantasy PC/Console Game" and "Best Science Fiction or Fantasy Mobile Game" were combined into a single category in 2023.

=== Best Science Fiction or Fantasy Mobile Game ===
* Winner(s)

Year	Work	Developers(s)	Ref.
2016	Fallout Shelter *	Bethesda Softworks	
2016	Hyper Burner	Patrick Cook	
2016	PewDiePie: Legend of the Brofist	Outerminds	
2016	Quaser One	Emre Taskin	
2016	Star Wars: Galaxy of Heroes	Electronic Arts	
2017	Pokémon Go *	Niantic	
2017	Con Man: The Game	Monkey Strength Productions	
2017	Fire Emblem Heroes	Nintendo	
2017	Monument Valley 2	Ustwogames	
2017	Sky Dancer	Pine Entertainment	
2017	Super Mario Run	Nintendo	
2018	Harry Potter: Hogwarts Mystery *	Jam City	
2018	Final Fantasy XV: Pocket Edition	Square Enix	
2018	Lineage 2 Revolution	Netmarble	
2018	Nocked!	Andrew G. Schneider	
2018	Planescape: Torment, the Enhanced Edition	Beamdog	
2019	Harry Potter: Wizards Unite *	Niantic, WB Games San Francisco	
2019	Cyber Hunter	NetEase	
2019	The Elder Scrolls: Blades	Bethesda Softworks	
2019	Grimvalor	Direlight	
2019	Reigns: Game of Thrones	Nerial	
2019	Sega Heroes: Puzzle RPG Quest	SEGA	
2020	Minecraft Earth *	Mojang Studios, Xbox Game Studios	
2020	Arknights	Hypergryph, Yostar	
2020	Call of Duty: Mobile	TiMi Studios, Activision	
2020	Grindstone	Capybara Games	
2020	Manifold Garden	William Chyr Studio	
2020	Mutazione	Die Gute Fabrik, Akupara Games	
2021	Harry Potter: Puzzles and Spells *	Zynga	
2021	Alba: A Wildlife Adventure	Ustwo, Plug in Digital	
2021	Empire of Sin	Paradox Interactive	
2021	Genshin Impact	miHoYo	
2021	Orwell's Animal Farm	The Dairymen Ltd.	
2021	South of the Circle	State of Play Games	
2022	Diablo Immortal *	Blizzard	
2022	Alien: Isolation	Sega	
2022	Baba Is You	Hempuli	
2022	Pokémon Unite	The Pokémon Company	
2022	Townscaper	Oskar Stålberg	
2022	World of Demons	PlatinumGames	

The categories "Best Science Fiction or Fantasy PC/Console Game" and "Best Science Fiction or Fantasy Mobile Game" were combined into a single category in 2023.

=== Best Digital Game ===
* Winner(s)

Year	Work	Publisher(s)	Ref.
2023	The Legend of Zelda: Tears of the Kingdom *	Nintendo EPD	
2023	Call of Duty: Modern Warfare II	Infinity Ward	
2023	Diablo IV	Blizzard Entertainment	
2023	Hogwarts Legacy	Avalanche Software	
2023	Overwatch 2	Blizzard Entertainment	
2023	Star Wars Jedi: Survivor	Respawn Entertainment	
2024	Baldur's Gate 3 *	Larian Studios	
2024	Alan Wake 2	Remedy Entertainment	
2024	Dragon's Dogma 2	Capcom	
2024	Elden Ring Shadow of the Erdtree	FromSoftware	
2024	Helldivers 2	Arrowhead Game Studios	
2024	Starfield	Bethesda Game Studios	
2025	Assassin's Creed Shadows *	Ubisoft Quebec	
2025	Death Stranding 2: On the Beach	Kojima Productions	
2025	Split Fiction	Hazelight Studios	
2025	Elden Ring Nightreign	FromSoftware	
2025	Monster Hunter Wilds	Capcom	
2025	Kingdom Come: Deliverance II	Warhorse Studios	
2026	Hollow Knight: Silksong	Team Cherry	
2026	Hades II	Supergiant Games	
2026	Silent Hill f	NeoBards Entertainment	
2026	Ghost of Yōtei	Sucker Punch Productions	
2026	Forza Horizon 6	Playground Games	
2026	Battlefield 6	Battlefield Studios	

=== Best Science Fiction or Fantasy Board Game ===
* Winner(s)

Year	Work	Publisher(s)	Ref.
2016	Pandemic: Legacy *	Z-Man Games	
2016	Star Wars: Rebellion	Fantasy Flight Games	
2016	Blood Rage	CoolMiniOrNot	
2016	Talon	GMT Games	
2016	Monopoly: Cthulhu	USAopoly	
2016	Codenames	Vlaada Chvátil	
2017	Betrayal at House on the Hill: Widow's Walk *	Avalon Hill	
2017	Gloomhaven	Cephalofair Games	
2017	Hero Realms	White Wizard Games	
2017	Mansions of Madness (2nd edition)	Fantasy Flight Games	
2017	Scythe	Stonemaier Games	
2017	Terraforming Mars	Stronghold Games	
2018	Red Dragon Inn 6: Villains *	Slugfest Games	
2018	Azul	Plan B Games	
2018	Mysterium: Secrets and Lies Expansion	Asmodee	
2018	Photosynthesis	Blue Orange Games	
2018	Rising Sun	CMON Games	
2018	When I Dream	Asmodee	
2019	Betrayal Legacy *	Avalon Hill Games	
2019	Architects of the West Kingdom	Garphill Games	
2019	Cryptid	Osprey Games	
2019	Everdell	Starling Games	
2019	Nemesis	Awaken Realms	
2019	Root	Leder Games	
2020	Tapestry *	Stonemaier Games	
2020	The Crew: The Quest for Planet Nine	Kosmos	
2020	Forgotten Waters	Plaid Hat Games	
2020	The King's Dilemma	Horrible Guild Game Studio	
2020	Jaws of the Lion	Cephalofair Games	
2020	Power Rangers: Heroes of the Grid	Renegade Game Studios	
2021	Dune: Imperium *	Dire Wolf Games	
2021	Curious Cargo	Capstone Games	
2021	Marvel United	CMON Limited	
2021	Oceans	North Star Games	
2021	Pandemic Legacy: Season 0	Z-Man Games	
2021	Sleeping Gods	Red Raven Games	
2022	Star Wars: Outer Rim - Unfinished Business *	Fantasy Flight Games	
2022	7 Wonders: Architects	Asmodee	
2022	ALIEN: Fate of the Nostromo	Ravensburger	
2022	Ark Nova	Capstone Games	
2022	Cascadia	Alderac Entertainment Group	
2022	Return to Dark Tower	Restoration Games	

The categories "Best Science Fiction or Fantasy Board Game" and "Best Science Fiction or Fantasy Miniatures / Collectible Card / Role-Playing Game" were combined into a single category in 2023.

=== Best Science Fiction or Fantasy Miniatures / Collectible Card / Role-Playing Game ===
* Winner(s)

Year	Work	Publisher(s)	Ref.
2016	Call of Cthulhu Roleplaying Game (7th edition) *	Chaosium	
2016	Deluxe Tunnels & Trolls	Flying Buffalo	
2016	Magic: The Gathering: Shadows over Innistrad	Wizards of the Coast	
2016	Magic: The Gathering: Battle for Zendikar	Wizards of the Coast	
2016	Mouse Guard Roleplaying Game (2nd edition)	David Petersen, Luke Crane	
2016	Star Wars: Armada	Fantasy Flight Games	
2017	Magic: The Gathering: Eldritch Moon *	Wizards of the Coast	
2017	A Shadow Across the Galaxy: X-Wing Wave X	Fantasy Flight Games	
2017	Bloodborne: The Card Game	CMON Limited	
2017	Dark Souls: The Board Game	Steamforged Games	
2017	Pulp Cthulhu	Chaosium	
2017	Star Wars: Destiny	Fantasy Flight Games	
2018	Magic: The Gathering: Unstable *	Wizards of the Coast	
2018	Bubblegumshoe	Evil Hat Productions	
2018	Cooking with Dice: The Acid Test	Oddfish Games	
2018	D100 Dungeon	Martin Knight	
2018	Force and Destiny Role-playing Game: Knights of Fate	Fantasy Flight Games	
2018	Warhammer 40,000 8th Edition	Games Workshop	
2019	Call of Cthulhu: Masks of Nyarlathotep Slipcase Set *	Chaosium	
2019	Fallout: Wasteland Warfare	Modiphius Entertainment	
2019	Keyforge: Call of the Archons	Fantasy Flight Games	
2019	Magic: The Gathering: Ravnica Allegiance	Wizards of the Coast	
2019	Magic: The Gathering War of The Spark	Wizards of the Coast	
2019	Warhammer 40,000: Kill Team	Games Workshop	
2020	Magic: The Gathering: Throne of Eldraine *	Wizards of the Coast	
2020	Alien RPG	Free League Publishing	
2020	Battlestar Galactica: Starship Battles: Viper Mk. VII	Ares Games	
2020	Pathfinder Second Edition	Paizo Publishing	
2020	Spectaculars Core Game	Scratchpad Publishing	
2020	Warhammer Age of Sigmar: Warcry	Games Workshop	
2021	Warhammer: Age of Sigmar: Soulbound Role-Playing Game *	Cubicle 7	
2021	Cyberpunk RED	R. Talsorian Games	
2021	Explorer's Guide to Wildemount	Wizards of the Coast	
2021	Magic: The Gathering: Strixhaven: School of Mages	Wizards of the Coast	
2021	Magic: The Gathering: Zendikar Rising	Wizards of the Coast	
2021	Pokémon TCG: Champion's Path Elite Trainer Box	The Pokémon Company	
2022	Magic: The Gathering, Dungeons & Dragons: Adventures in the Forgotten Realms *	Wizards of the Coast	
2022	The One Ring Roleplaying Game, Second Edition	Free League Publishing	
2022	Thirsty Sword Lesbians	Evil Hat Productions	
2022	Root: The Role Playing Game	Magpie Games	
2022	The Lord of the Rings: The Card Game	Fantasy Flight Games	
2022	Magic: The Gathering, Innistrad: Crimson Vow	Wizards of the Coast	

The categories "Best Science Fiction or Fantasy Board Game" and "Best Science Fiction or Fantasy Miniatures / Collectible Card / Role-Playing Game" were combined into a single category in 2023.

=== Best Tabletop Game ===
* Winner(s)

Year	Work	Publisher(s)	Ref.
2023	Magic the Gathering: The Lord of the Rings: Tales of Middle-earth *	Wizards of the Coast	
2023	Frosthaven	Cephalofair Games	
2023	Earth	Inside Up Games	
2023	Dorfromantik – The Boardgame	Pegasus Spiele	
2023	Turing Machine	Scorpion Masque	
2023	Alien Role-playing Game: Heart of Darkness	Free League	
2024	D&D The Deck of Many Things *	Wizards of the Coast	
2024	Cascadia: Landmarks	Flatout Games	
2024	Dune: Imperium – Uprising	Dire Wolf	
2024	Magic: The Gathering Wilds of Eldraine	Wizards of the Coast	
2024	Disney Lorcana	Ravensburger	
2024	Gloomhaven: Buttons & Bugs	Cephalofair Games	
2025	Magic the Gathering: Final Fantasy *	Wizards of the Coast	
2025	Arcs	Leder Games	
2025	Magic the Gathering: Bloomburrow	Wizards of the Coast	
2025	Heat: Tunnel Vision	Days of Wonder	
2025	Splendor: The Silk Road	Space Cowboys	
2025	Disney Lorcana: Archazia’s Island	Ravensburger	
2026	Forgotten Realms: Heroes of Faerûn*	Wizards of the Coast	
2026	ACKS II Revised Rulebook	Autarch	
2026	Magic: the Gathering – Teenage Mutant Ninja Turtles	Wizards of the Coast	
2026	7 Wonders Dice	Repos Production	
2026	Warhammer 40,000 The Maelstrom	Games Workshop	
2026	Wingspan Americas Expansion	Stonemaier Games	
