= Sci Phi Journal =

Science fiction on-line magazine

- Editors: Adam Gerencser; Mariano Martin Rodriguez
- Categories: Science fiction, Short fiction, Nonfiction
- Frequency: Quarterly
- First issue: October 1, 2014
- Country: Belgium
- Language: English
- Website: sciphijournal.org

Sci Phi Journal is a quarterly online magazine (formerly monthly, with a print option) devoted to publishing science fiction stories and essays "at the intersection between speculative philosophy", anthropology and other humanities, with a particular focus on "fictional non-fiction". The first issue was published in October 2014. Jason Rennie founded and helmed the publication with Ben Zwycky until mid-2017. The quarterly was then briefly managed by Ray Blank, and has been edited by Adam Gerencser and Mariano Martin Rodriguez since January 2019, the pair having relaunched the magazine as a "European project".

In November 2014, a short story by Lou Antonelli featured in the magazine's second issue was nominated for the 2015 Hugo Award for Best Short Story. In 2016, the journal was a finalist for the Hugo Award, and nominated for the Locus Award. At the 2022 EuroCon held in Luxembourg, Sci Phi Journal won the European SF Award for Best Magazine. Cover art and non-fiction essays featured in the magazine were also finalists for the 2022 Utopia Awards. In 2024, the Franz Liszt Institute in Brussels hosted an exhibition of Sci Phi Journal solarpunk covers.

== Notable authors ==
Notable authors published in the magazine include:

- Lou Antonelli
- Michael F. Flynn
- Andrew Fraknoi
- Sean Patrick Hazlett
- L. Jagi Lamplighter
- Edward M. Lerner
- Paul Levinson
- Brian Niemeier
- Benjamin Rosenbaum
- Luís Filipe Silva
- Shweta Taneja
- Ian Watson
