= Laurie Wolf =

American food writer and entrepreneur (born c. 1956)

- Born: Laurie Gail Goldrich c. 1956 (age 69–70); New York City
- Education: The Culinary Institute of America
- Spouse: Bruce Wolf (m. 1984)
- Writing career
- Genres: Children's books, Food writing

Laurie Goldrich Wolf (born c. 1956) is an American food writer and entrepreneur. Her husband since 1984, Bruce Wolf, who is a professional photographer, sometimes collaborates with her.

== Education and early career ==
Wolf graduated from the Calhoun School in Manhattan and The Culinary Institute of America, worked as a chef and caterer, and as food editor for Mademoiselle and Child for 18 years. Wolf and her husband moved from New York to Portland in 2008.

== Book writing ==
Wolf has written several children's books. Candy 1 to 20 (photography by her husband Bruce), which teaches children to read and count numbers with photographs of candy, received a Kirkus Reviews writeup that noted its "transformation of the familiar into the sweetly surprising", and a review from Publishers Weekly that called it an "especially kid-friendly approach to counting".

Her 2014 Portland, Oregon Chef's Table was described as "both as a cookbook and a restaurant guide", and a "powerful tour of Portland's current restaurant scene". The book contains a full chapter on brunch, a uniquely prominent facet of Portland's restaurant scene.

Her crowdfunded 2015 cookbook Herb: Mastering the Art of Cooking with Cannabis was coauthored with Melissa Parks, a graduate of Le Cordon Bleu in Minneapolis.

Since 2014, she has been the food writer for The Cannabist.

== Business ==
Laurie and Bruce Wolf's Portland business Laurie & MaryJane produces sweet and savory cannabis edibles.

== Personal life ==
Wolf is a member of Portland's Jewish community. Laurie and Bruce Wolf have two children.

== Bibliography ==
- Wolf, Laurie; Abrams, Pam (2008). The only bake sale cookbook you'll ever need : 201 mouthwatering, kid-pleasing treats (first ed.). HarperCollins. ISBN 978-0061233838.
- Wolf, Laurie (2010). The Do It Myself Kids' Cookbook: Nothing Hot, Nothing Sharp. Downtown Bookworks. ISBN 978-1935703099.
- Wolf, Laurie (2010). Recyclo-gami : 40 crafts to make your friends green with envy!. Running Press Teens. ISBN 9780762440528.
- Wolf, Laurie (2011). The Lonely Sock Club. Simon and Schuster. ISBN 9781935703068.
- Wolf, Laurie (2012). Boy-Made. Simon and Schuster. ISBN 9781935703280.
- Wolf, Laurie (2012). Crafty Princess. Simon and Schuster. ISBN 9781935703426.
- Wolf, Laurie (2012). Portland, Oregon Chef's Table: Extraordinary Recipes from the City of Roses. Lyons Press. ISBN 978-0762778102.
- Wolf, Laurie (2014). Food Lovers' Guide to Portland, Oregon (first ed.). Globe Pequot. ISBN 978-0762792139.
- Wolf, Laurie (2015). Food Lovers' Guide to Seattle. Globe Pequot. ISBN 978-0762796632.
- Wolf, Laurie; Parks, Melissa (2015). Herb: Mastering the Art of Cooking with Cannabis (first ed.). Inkshares. ISBN 978-1941758250.
- Wolf, Laurie (2016). Cooking With Cannabis. Quarry Books. ISBN 9781631591167.
