= Herb: Mastering the Art of Cooking with Cannabis =

2015 cannabis cookbook by Laurie Wolf with Melissa Parks

- Author: Laurie Wolf
- Subject: Cannabis cookbook
- Genre: Nonfiction - cooking
- Publisher: Inkshares
- Publication date: 2015
- Publication place: United States
- ISBN: 978-1941758250
- OCLC: 900031251

Herb: Mastering the Art of Cooking with Cannabis is a crowdfunded 2015 cannabis cookbook by American author and chef Laurie Wolf with Melissa Parks, a graduate of Le Cordon Bleu in Minneapolis. It has been noted as one of the first pertaining to cooking with cannabis after legalization in several U.S. states.

== Critical reception ==
A National Geographic review said it rose to the challenge of improving on existing edibles lore that "just doesn't taste very good", and a New Republic review, while calling it an "ambitious attempt to bring together the weed brownie set and the dinner party set" that "aims to do for weed what Julia Child did for French cuisine" was somewhat critical of its "murky positioning somewhere between 'basics' and 'cuisine'", with short headnotes and a lack of focus on kitchen fundamentals for novice chefs.

The Los Angeles Times reviewer said in 2018 the book is "one of the better books about cannabis cooking. It's both pragmatic and culinary-minded, and avoids the stoner language that can obfuscate the prose of the genre".

SF Weekly's cannabis magazine SF Evergreen said it is "a wonderfully inventive high-end cookbook" with "mind-blowing range of culinary cannabis possibilities"; "a true gourmet coffee-table cookbook that holds its own with high-end releases" and praised the "breathtaking" food photography.

== See also ==
- List of books about cannabis
