= The Captive's War =

Series of space opera novels by James S. A. Corey

- The Mercy of Gods (2024); Livesuit (novella, 2024); The Faith of Beasts (2026)
- Author: James S. A. Corey
- Genre: Science fiction, space opera
- Publisher: Orbit Books
- Published: 2024–present
- Media type: Print, audiobook, e-book

The Captive's War is a series of science fiction novels, and related novellas and short stories by James S. A. Corey, the joint pen name of authors Daniel Abraham and Ty Franck. After being announced in 2018 as a trilogy of novels, the first novel, The Mercy of Gods, was released in 2024, followed by the novella Livesuit later that year. In 2026, the second novel, The Faith of Beasts was released. Both full novels became New York Times Best Sellers.

In November 2024, it was announced that a TV series would be developed by Amazon MGM Studios and Expanding Universe.

== Development and production ==
The project was first announced in May 2018 as a new space opera trilogy. James S.A. Corey would later state the idea behind the series was "the biblical Book of Daniel as a sci-fi story".

On May 28, 2024, Polygon released an excerpt of The Mercy of Gods's first chapter ahead of the book's debut.

== Television adaptation ==
In 2024, the authors launched the production company Expanding Universe alongside The Expanse showrunner Naren Shankar and director Breck Eisner. Alongside the launch they announced that a television adaptation of The Captive's War would be developed with Amazon MGM Studios. All four serve as executive producers, with Shankar and Eisner reprising their respective roles from The Expanse as showrunner and director. Additionally, Abraham, Franck and Shankar are acting as the show's writers.

== World-building ==
The series is centered on the Carryx, an empire which expands its power by conquering other species and exploiting their usefulness, if they have any. Every subjugated moiety has to prove its worth to the Carryx to ensure their continued existence.
