= The Faith of Beasts =

2026 novel by James S.A. Corey

- Author: James S. A. Corey
- Audio read by: Jefferson Mays
- Cover artist: Daniel Dociu
- Language: English
- Series: The Captive's War
- Release number: 1
- Genre: Science fiction; Space opera
- Published: April 14, 2026
- Publisher: Orbit Books
- Publication place: United States
- Media type: Print (Hardcover), Audio, eBook
- Pages: 448
- ISBN: 978-0-316-52567-1
- OCLC: 1552085091
- Preceded by: The Mercy of Gods

The Faith of Beasts is a 2026 science fiction novel by American authors Daniel Abraham and Ty Franck, writing under the pen name James S. A. Corey. It is the second main entry in the The Captive's War trilogy. It was preceded by The Mercy of Gods and the novella Livesuit.

The novel continues the story of Dafyd Alkhor and his fellow humans as they navigate their new lives as slaves in the empire of the alien Carryx after their home planet was conquered and subjugated. As their assigned roles under Carryx rule evolve, they must navigate the risks and opportunities that these changes present. Besides Dafyd, they add alongside the points-of-views of Jessyn Kaul, Surur: A keeper-librarian, Campar, and The Swarm: A biological spy created by the Carryx’s enemies and currently in the form of Jellit.

The book was released on April 14, 2026, by Orbit Books.

== Plot ==
After the events of the first book, 500 humans have been sent off to various studies across the empire with the rest remaining in the world city. Dafyd meets with Carryx keeper-librarian Ekur-Tkalal, who tells Dafyd that humanity needs sustain their own population long-term. Dafyd makes the decision to create babies in artificial wombs.

Jessyn has been sent to a remote planet that was inhabited by the enemies of the Carryx, known as “The Deathless Ones”. A sinen named Third Gardener explains that the enemy attempts to destroy all evidence in the worlds they leave behind and that this presents a rare opportunity to learn about them. Jessyn meets up with Garral, another human researcher, and is captured by a group of humans attempting to evacuate the planet. They then realize that The Deathless Enemy is humanity.

Rickar, infected with the swarm’s communication signal at the end of the Mercy of Gods, has been sent with an expedition fleet to an unknown battlefield along with Campar and Ghati. Their warship emerges from “Asymmetric Space” into a battle with The Deathless Enemy. After weeks of fighting, the Carryx fleet is victorious with the Deathless Enemy fleet either being destroyed or fleeing. The lone exception is the Deathless Enemy's command ship, which is damaged but apparently abandoned.

Back in the World-Palace, Tonner discovers that the Soft Lothark are able to communicate through DNA exchange, which allows them to communicate without the knowledge of the Carryx. He announces this publicly but is quickly killed by the Soft Lothark. Dafyd hides this revelation from Ekur-Tkalal and surreptitiously forms a fledgling alliance with the Soft Lothark. The Swarm manages to access the archives of the Carryx.

Jessyn and Garral put the evacuation plan for the stranded humans into action, with Jessyn returning to the main camp of the Carryx expedition. Their plan appears to be a success when the shuttles fail to launch initially, and she believes Garral escaped.

Ghati and Campar meanwhile, alongside Vaudai, an alien slug, are sent to board the enemy command ship to retrieve data about the Deathless Enemy. Mid-expedition, however, The Deathless Enemy returns to the system. Campar sustains heavy injuries and the data is lost. Simultaneously, The swarm is able to send the info it has gathered to the enemy fleet, causing Rickar to violently combust.

On the World-Palace, the first generation of human babies are hatched by the embryos sparking happiness in the colony as Ghati, Campar, and Jessyn return to the colony. Meanwhile, the Carryx Queen meets, and is killed by, her daughter, who is in turn declared Queen.

Dafyd discusses with the swarm that humans are merely one part of The Deathless Enemy. The total records of the war go back millions of years. The Sovran is killed soon after, and replaced by one of their daughters, as the human moiety realizes that assassinating the Sovran would not topple the empire. Dafyd then asks the question what would happen if there were two Sovrans instead.

The novel ends with Garral, now having been rescued by The Deathless Enemy, meeting a human interrogator. They show him a photo of the World-Palace transmitted by the Swarm. After both admitted they don’t know how it was transmitted, the interrogator asks him to start at the beginning: Explaining the planet Anjiin.

== Publication ==
The Faith of Beasts was published as hardcover and e-book on April 14, 2026, by Orbit Books. An audiobook version narrated by Jefferson Mays was released on the same date. A day later, the first chapter was also released on the website Polygon. Two weeks after its release, it ranked 6th in the list of New York Times Best Sellers.
