= M. A. Rothman =

American writer of science fiction

- Born: Michael A. Rothman
- Occupations: Engineer; Writer
- Writing career
- Period: 2006–present
- Genres: Epic fantasy; Non-fiction; Science fiction; Techno thriller; Urban fantasy
- Subjects: Computer science; UEFI
- Notable works: Darwin's Cipher (2020); The Inside Man (2019); Primordial Threat (2018)
- Website: michaelarothman.com

Michael A. Rothman is an American engineer and writer of science fiction, epic fantasy, and techno thriller novels. His fiction books are generally published under the name M. A. Rothman. He has contributed to over 1000 patents worldwide, and is one of the primary architects of the UEFI standard. He has co-authored two books and six papers about the standard.

His debut novel, an epic fantasy young adult story titled Heirs of Prophecy, was published in 2012. Since then, he has written several novels in the hard science fiction, epic fantasy, techno thriller, and dystopia genres. Three of his novels have appeared on the USA Today bestseller list.

== Biography ==
Rothman has Jewish heritage and was the first in his family to be born in the United States. He is a senior engineer at Intel and is one of the primary architects of the UEFI standard as the chair of the UEFI Configuration Sub-team (UCST). As of September 2022, he has contributed to 286 utility patents registered with the United States Patent and Trademark Office, and contributed to 737 additional patents registered outside the United States.

His debut novel was the epic fantasy young adult Heirs of Prophecy, published in April 2012 through M & S Publishing, with sequels published in July that year and April 2013. A prequel, Princess Interrupted, was published in October 2013. The series was reissued in 2020 through Primordial Press, with the prequel being renamed Agent of Prophecy.

The post-apocalyptic Dispocalypse was released in June 2016 through M & S under the name Michael A. Rothman. It was later made the third in Rothman's New Beginnings series, with the prequels Running From Destiny and The Code Breaker released in October 2020 through Primordial Press. The near-future hard science fiction novel, Primordial Threat, was released in August 2018 and debuted at #128 on the USA Today best seller list on October 25, 2018.

The first book featuring Mafia fixer Levi Yoder, Perimeter, was released in October 2018. Two sequels, The Inside Man and Never Again, were released in September 2020. The Inside Man debuted at #122 on the USA Today list on July 18, 2019. Darwin's Cipher, a standalone medical thriller novel, was released in February 2019 and appeared at #88 on the USA Today best seller list on September 10, 2020. A sequel to Primordial Threat, Freedom's Last Gasp, was released in April 2020.

== Non-fiction bibliography ==
Published as "Michael A. Rothman" or "Michael Rothman" unless otherwise noted.

=== Books ===
- Beyond Bios: Implementing the Unified Extensible Firmware Interface with Intel's Framework, with Vincent Zimmer and Robert Hale (January 2006, Intel Press, ISBN 0974364908)
  - Second edition, with Vincent Zimmer and Suresh Marisetty (2011, Intel Press, ISBN 9781934053294)
  - Third edition, with Vincent Zimmer and Suresh Marisetty (January 2017, De|G Press, ISBN 9781501514784)
- Harnessing the UEFI Shell: Moving the Platform Beyond DOS, with Vincent Zimmer, Tim Lewis, and Robert Hale (January 2010, Intel Press, ISBN 978-1934053140)
  - Second edition, with Vincent Zimmer and Tim Lewis (March 2017, De|G Press, ISBN 978-1501514807)

=== Papers and articles ===
- "EFI Architecture" (May 2007, Dr. Dobb's Journal, with Vincent Zimmer and Robert Hale)
- "A Tale of Two Standards" (2009, Intel Press, with Vincent Zimmer, Mark Doran, and Dong Wei)
- "UEFI: From Reset Vector to Operating System" (chapter) in Hardware-dependent Software: Principle and Practice edited by Ecker, et al. (January 2009, Springer Dordrecht, with Vincent Zimmer and Robert Hale, ISBN 978-1-4020-9435-4)
- "The Evolution of the Unified Extensible Firmware Interface" (November 2010, Dr. Dobb's Journal, with Vincent Zimmer and Suresh Marisetty)
- "Using UEFI in embedded systems, from smartphones to in-vehicle infotainment" (May 2013, LinuxGizmos.com, with Vincent Zimmer)
- "Configuration from bare metal to the cloud-leveraging modern systems to enhance manageability" (2014, Intel Press, with Vincent Zimmer)

== Fiction bibliography ==
Published as "M. A. Rothman" unless otherwise noted.

=== Connor Sloane ===
A suspense spy thriller series about Connor Sloane, a CIA operations officer.

- Patriot (April 2021, Primordial Press, ISBN 979-8709573888)
- The Death Speech (June 2021, Primordial Press, ISBN 9798539212254)

=== The Exodus ===
A hard science fiction series set in the late 2060s.

- Primordial Threat (August 2018, ISBN 978-1-983323-00-3)
- Freedom's Last Gasp (April 2020, Primordial Press, ISBN 978-0-9976793-2-8)

=== Levi Yoder ===
A technothriller series set in the near future. It follows the adventures of Levi Yoder, a Mafia fixer.

- Perimeter (October 2018, Primordial Press, ISBN 9781087910574)
- The Inside Man (September 2020, Primordial Press, ISBN 9781087910628)
- Never Again (September 2020, Primordial Press, ISBN 9781087910635)
- The Swamp (July 2022, Primordial Press, ISBN 9798838191380)

=== New beginnings ===
A new adult urban fantasy series.

1. Running From Destiny (October 2020, Primordial Press, ISBN 9798551641919)
2. The Code Breaker (October 2020, Primordial Press, ISBN 9798553584375)
3. Dispocalypse (June 2016, M & S Publishing, ISBN 9780989089494)

=== The Plainswalker ===
A military fantasy series.

1. The Plainswalker (March 2021, Primordial Press, ISBN 979-872770439-4)
2. The Sage's Tower (December 2021, Primordial Press, ISBN 979-8784184153)

=== The Prophecies ===
An epic young adult fantasy series. Originally published as Michael A. Rothman through M & S Publishing.

1. Heirs of Prophecy (April 2012, ISBN 9780985169701)
2. Tools of Prophecy (July 2012, ISBN 9780985169756)
3. Lords of Prophecy (April 2013, ISBN 9780989089401)

Other volumes in the series:

- Princess Interrupted (prequel, October 2013, ISBN 9780989089425)
- The Trimoriad (omnibus of volumes 1–3, October 2013, ISBN 9780989089456)

The series was reissued by Primordial Press in 2020, with Princess Interrupted renamed to Agent of Prophecy, the series renumbered, and the author changed to "M. A. Rothman":

1. Agent of Prophecy (June 2020, ISBN 9798656903752)
2. Heirs of Prophecy (July 2020, ISBN 9798668349104)
3. Tools of Prophecy (August 2020, ISBN 9798679636019)
4. Lords of Prophecy (September 2020, ISBN 9798691359293)

=== Other novels ===
- Darwin's Cipher (February 2019, Primordial Press, ISBN 9780997679304)
- Multiverse (September 2022, Primordial Press ISBN 9798848453263)
- Time Trials with D. J. Butler (March 2023, Baen, ISBN 9781982192488)

=== Short fiction ===
- "Rise of the Administrator", with D. J. Butler, in Worlds Long Lost edited by Christopher Ruocchio and Sean C. W. Korsgaard (December 2022, Baen Books, ISBN 9781982192303). A prequel to Time Trials. The free sample of the book at the publisher's Web site includes the story as "Chapter 4".

== Critical reception ==
Kirkus Reviews stated that—in Perimeter—Rothman created "a first-rate introduction to energetic characters" in his Levi Yoder series. His writing in Darwin's Cipher was called a "smart, engrossing tale that entertainingly uses science." The writing in Time Trials, co-authored with D. J. Butler, was described as "highly enjoyable" and "entertaining", having well-developed characters, and praised for "refreshingly [showing] respect for ancient civilizations and their accomplishments".
