= The Mercy of Gods =

2024 novel by James S.A. Corey

- Author: James S. A. Corey
- Audio read by: Jefferson Mays
- Cover artist: Daniel Dociu
- Language: English
- Series: The Captive's War
- Release number: 1
- Genre: Science fiction; Space opera
- Published: August 6, 2024
- Publisher: Orbit Books
- Publication place: United States
- Media type: Print (Hardcover), Audio, eBook
- Pages: 432
- ISBN: 978-0-316-52557-2
- OCLC: 1417095377
- Followed by: The Faith of Beasts

The Mercy of Gods is a 2024 science fiction novel by American authors Daniel Abraham and Ty Franck, writing under the pseudonym James S. A. Corey. It is the first book in The Captive's War trilogy. The novel is set in a distant future where a human-settled planet has been conquered by an alien race called the Carryx. The story follows Dafyd Alkhor, a human research assistant, as he and his fellow captives struggle to survive under alien rule while maintaining their humanity.

The book was released on August 6, 2024, by Orbit Books. The Mercy of Gods has been praised for its world-building, character development, and exploration of themes such as resistance and individuality under authoritarian regimes.

== Plot ==
On the planet Anjiin, humans live with a native ecosystem with a different biochemical basis. Humans are believed to have arrived on Anjiin thousands of years ago, though their exact origins are unknown. Dafyd Alkhor is a low-level research assistant in Tonner Freis's celebrated workgroup, including Else Yannin, Jessyn Kaul, Campar, Rickar Daumatin, and Irinna. Freis's team has risen to preeminence in succeeding in "reconciling" the two different biochemical "trees of life" native to Anjiin, understanding and thus being able to alter their metabolisms, such that they can enter into an ecological union.

Anjiin is suddenly invaded by a vastly technologically superior alien species called the Carryx and their subservient species. After killing one-eighth of the population, the Carryx abduct many of the planet's social and scientific elite, including Dafyd's cohort. The captives are taken aboard Carryx ships and transported to a distant star system where the administrative center of the Carryx empire is located in a world-city (known as world-palace among the Carryx). In one of its ziggurats, Dafyd's team is assigned to a research project by their Carryx overseer (keeper-librarian), who reminds them that humanity's survival depends on their usefulness to the Carryx. The task requires making one alien organism (called "berries") nutritionally compatible with another (called "not-turtles").

As the collective strives to adapt to captivity, they face adversities. They must defend themselves against attacks from another captive species called Night Drinkers. Jessyn battles her psychiatric ailments without her medication. Bonds within the team become strained, especially separating Tonner, Else, and Dafyd. Meanwhile, a resistance movement forms among the human captives, led by Urrys Ostencour, who plan to create bioweapons to use against the Carryx. Some members of Tonner's team become participants.

Dafyd learns from Else that she is host to an entity called the Swarm – a spy sent by the Carryx's enemies in an ongoing interstellar warfare. Else convinces Dafyd to betray the resistance to the Carryx to protect their long-term chances of survival. Divided by devotion to his fellow humans and fear of the results, Dafyd ultimately decides to inform the Carryx librarian about the rebellion. This leads to a violent purge, causing the deaths of many humans, including Else, who dies after the Swarm exits her body. The Carryx execute one of their own, the librarian, for being "saved by an animal". A new Carryx keeper-librarian of the humans named Ekur-Tkalal is appointed, who informs the survivors that they have proven useful to the Carryx and will be assigned new duties. Dafyd is made the sole go-between humans and the Carryx. The team is likely to be separated, but Dafyd vows to find a way to defeat the Carryx in the long term. Now in Jellit's body, the Swarm contemplates its mission to transmit intelligence back to the Carryx's enemies, but finds itself split due to its expanding emotions and attachment to Dafyd.

== Background ==
The Mercy of Gods represents a new creative direction for authors Daniel Abraham and Ty Franck, following the completion of their nine-book series The Expanse. The genesis of the novel came from Franck, who found inspiration in the Book of Daniel. Intrigued by the story of Daniel being taken from "a little agrarian country" by a "gigantic military force," in the 2010s, Franck pitched the concept to Abraham as a science fiction retelling of this narrative. Abraham was drawn to the idea, viewing it as "The Book of Daniel as the biblical version of Orwell's Nineteen Eighty-Four," exploring the theme of maintaining individual identity within an authoritarian empire.

In constructing the alien Carryx consciousness, the authors drew inspiration from biological sources, particularly the social structures of termites and naked mole-rats. This approach allowed them to create an alien species where members are both highly intelligent individuals and part of a super-organism. Instead of materials, the Carryx are collecting over the galaxies a rare resource of intelligence, to have a library of unique talents and ideas of the conquered species. The authors described The Mercy of Gods as the "disappointing love child of Frank Herbert and Ursula Le Guin". The series "also has its roots in Viktor Frankl and Hannah Arendt". Unlike their previous work in The Expanse, which was human-centered and set in the near future, this new series introduces a host of different alien species, each undergoing a "plausibility check" based on Abraham's background in biology. The authors name convergent evolution as an underlying scientific principle applied both in biological context and the psychology of survival techniques.

While the authors attempted to avoid direct parallels to real-world events, they acknowledged the challenge of writing about enslaved humans without considering historical contexts, particularly the American experience of slavery. Through the new series, Abraham and Franck aim to explore themes of resistance and individuality, focusing on non-violent forms of survival and resistance rather than romanticized notions of rebellion. The novel serves as a platform for examining human resilience in the face of overwhelming odds, and how individuality can persist and hold power even in totalitarian or authoritarian settings.

== Style ==
The novel is narrated in a third-person limited, alternating between the points of view of Dafyd, Jessyn, other human characters, the Swarm and Ekur-Tkalal. Each of the book's six parts begins with an epigraph containing an excerpt from the "final statement" of a librarian Ekur-Tkalal as a narrator, revealing the fall of the Carryx empire and hinting at Dafyd's key role in it. With this flash-forward authors counterbalance the "dark" journey with a "ray of hope" and create a mystery of "how" the character will achieve the seemingly impossible.

== Reception ==
The Mercy of Gods received largely positive reviews from critics. Publishers Weekly called it a "masterful" series launch, praising the authors for creating "a dazzling new world" and describing it as "space opera at its best." They particularly commended the balance between "world-shaking events" and "nuanced and moving portraits of the people caught up in them." Andrea Dyba, writing for Library Journal, described the novel as an "impressive space opera" and an "intelligent and innovative sci-fi epic with infinite scope" and "nail-biting suspense", praising the novel's portrayal of alien species as "distinctive" and "downright chilling". Dyba noted that the book's strength lies in its ability to balance large-scale events with "small moments of human vulnerability and courage."

Zach Kram of The Ringer observed that "The Mercy of Gods" employs a "narrower narrative lens" compared to Corey's previous series The Expanse. Kram noted that while the novel "suffers from the lack of political maneuvering," its world-building "makes its universe feel unknowably gigantic." Kirkus Reviews called the novel "mind-blowing" and praised it as "the beginning of what could be Corey's most epic—and entertaining—series yet," highlighting the novel's "exceptional" character development, "breakneck" pacing and "sheer scope of the narrative", and "extraordinary" worldbuilding. Katie Fraser of The Bookseller called the novel "not only a triumphant introduction to a new galactic world that will appeal to Corey and The Expanse fans alike, but a timely depiction of human resilience in the darkest of times". AudioFile magazine awarded The Mercy of Gods with Earphones and named it among the 2024 best audiobooks.

== The Captive's War ==
=== Book trilogy ===
The Mercy of Gods starts The Captive's War series, which was first announced in 2018. The series is planned to consist of three novels and two novellas.

Preceded by the publication of the first chapter on the Polygon website in May 2024, The Mercy of Gods was released on 6 August by Orbit Books in hardcover and electronic format. An audiobook version narrated by Jefferson Mays was published by Recorded Books.

On October 1, 2024, a novella, Livesuit, was released in digital format. Its protagonist, Kirin, serves in an elite infantry unit that uses cutting-edge "livesuit" technology and is considered to be humanity's only hope for victory in a long war against a powerful intergalactic adversary.

A second novel in the series The Faith of Beasts was released on April 14, 2026.

=== Adaptation ===
In November 2024, it was announced that a TV adaptation of the trilogy under the same title is being developed for Amazon MGM Studios by Expanding Universe.
