= Tim Akers =

American author of speculative fiction (born 1972)

John Timothy Akers
- Born: December 12, 1972 (age 53); Buncombe County, North Carolina, U.S.
- Occupation: Author
- Writing career
- Pen name: Tim Akers
- Genres: Science fiction, fantasy
- Website: www.timakers.net

John Timothy Akers (born December 12, 1972) is an American author of speculative fiction. He writes as Tim Akers.

== Life ==
John Timothy Akers was born in rural Buncombe County, North Carolina, the only son of John Nance Akers, a theologian. He moved to Chicago, Illinois for college, and has resided in that area since. He is married.

== Writing career ==
Akers has been active in the speculative fiction field since 2004. His work has appeared in various periodicals and anthologies, including Apex Magazine, ChiZine, Clarkesworld Magazine, Electric Velocipede, Interzone, The Solaris Book of New Science Fiction, Volume Three, Strange Horizons, and Transmissions from Beyond.

== Bibliography ==
=== Burn Cycle ===
1. Heart of Veridon (2009)
2. Dead of Veridon (2011)
- Bones of Veridon (collection) (2013)

=== The Hallowed War ===
1. The Pagan Night (2016)
2. The Iron Hound (2017)
3. The Winter Vow (2018)

=== Knight Watch ===
1. Knight Watch (2020)
2. Valhellions (2022)

=== The Spiritbinder Saga ===
1. Wraithbound (2023)

=== Other novels ===
- The Horns of Ruin (2010)

=== Short stories ===
- "Memory Analog" (2004)
- "A Walking of Crows" (2006)
- "The Song" (2006)
- "Distro" (2006)
- "Toke" (2007)
- "The Algorithm" (2007)
- "A Soul Stitched to Iron" (2009)
- "The Quiet Front" (2013)
- "The Angel of Divine Intent" (2016)
- "A Death in the Wayward Drift" (2017)

=== Nonfiction ===
- "Faith in the Fantastic" (2012)

== Awards ==
The Pagan Night was a preliminary nominee for the 2017 Gemmell Award.
