= Susan Dennard =

American YA fantasy author

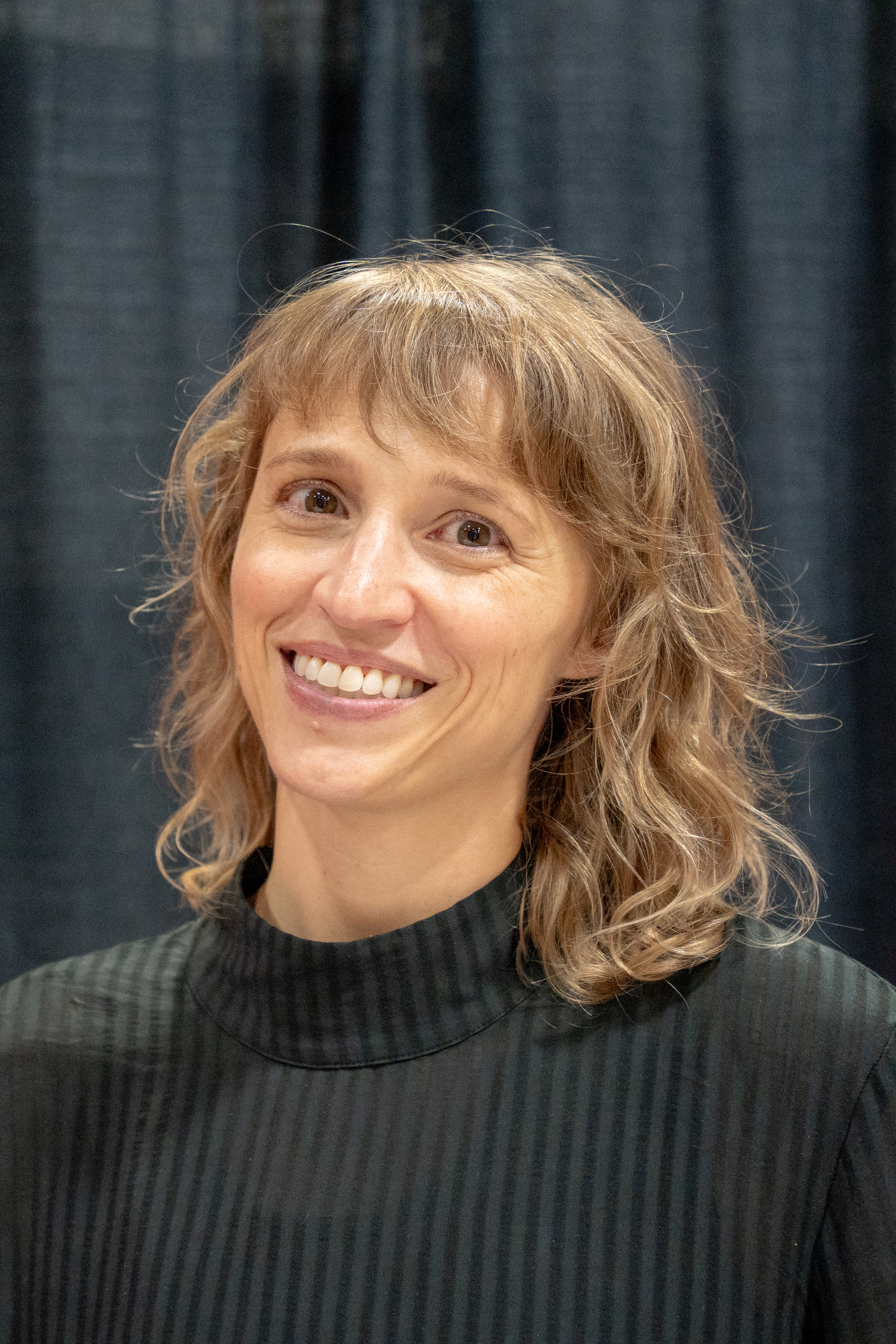
- Dennard at the 2025 National Book Festival
- Born: February 25, 1984 (age 42); Virginia, USA
- Occupation: Author
- Notable work: Something Strange and Deadly
- Website: susandennard.com

Susan Dennard (born February 25, 1984) is an American YA fantasy author. Her debut novel, Something Strange and Deadly, was published in 2012 by HarperCollins.

== Biography ==
Susan Dennard was born on February 25, 1984, in the state of Virginia, but primarily grew up in Dalton, Georgia. She originally planned to major in English at University of Georgia, but was "sidetracked by science" and obtained a bachelor's degrees in fisheries and statistics instead, and then received her master's in marine biology at the Great Lakes Institute for environmental research in Windsor, Ontario, with the intention of solving the problem of overfishing. This work led her around the world, to almost all of the seven continents, with the exception of Asia. In 2009, she chose to forego venturing a PhD and joined her husband in Germany. She currently lives in the Midwestern US.

== Career ==
Dennard focused on writing for publication upon leaving her PhD program. Her debut novel Something Strange and Deadly was released in July 2012, followed by its sequel A Darkness Strange and Lovely, released in July 2013, and Strange and Ever After in July 2014. A Dawn Most Wicked, a prequel novella to the series, was published a month before the second title of trilogy in 2013.

The Something Strange and Deadly series is set in Philadelphia during the time of the 1876 World Fair while an army of the dead is plaguing the city. Eleanor Fitt, the 16-year-old protagonist, finds out during a zombie attack that her brother has been taken hostage. She takes on the quest to get him back, enlisting the aid of the city's outcast supernatural defense force, called Spirit-Hunters.

A Darkness Strange and Lovely continues the story as Eleanor escapes to Paris, only to find that it also has been overrun with the Dead. She must dig deeper into the dark secrets of the city and its magic to keep her Spirit-Hunter friends and herself alive.

Strange and Ever After ends the series in 19th-century Egypt, where she tracks down her kidnapped friend taken by an evil necromancer, and uses her power to pay the price that will end the darkness once and for all.

The prequel, A Dawn Most Wicked, tells the story of Daniel, a future member of the Spirit-Hunters, prior to the events in book one, and how the Spirit-Hunters began. Daniel gets a new beginning working on a boat, where he meets Jie and Joseph, who become his Spirit-Hunter teammates. Ghosts give the crew horrible nightmares and threaten to put the boat out of business, and Daniel must find the cause and destroy the evil behind it to save the boat and his friends.

Her next book, Truthwitch, was bought by Tor Books and released in January 2016. It debuted at No. 4 on the New York Times' bestseller list. The protagonist Safiya, a truthwitch, along her best friend Iseult, a threadwitch who can sense the ties between other people, become caught up in a conspiracy between the empires. They take on the aid of Prince Merik, an admiral with the power to control wind, in hopes of avoiding the danger coming between the empires, while trying to elude the search of Aeduan, a bloodwitch soldier trained as a monk. The story follows these four characters as they try to find their paths and stay alive.

The second book, Windwitch, was published in January 2017. The cover for Windwitch was released online through Entertainment Weekly on May 3, 2016, along with an excerpt. It debuted at No. 2 in the New York Times Bestseller List. She also contributed to Because You Love to Hate Me, an anthology of short stories written by thirteen YA authors who were paired with thirteen BookTubers. It was published in July 2017.

A prequel novella, Sightwitch, was published on February 13, 2018. It takes place before Truthwitch and tells the story of Ryber and Kullen, two of Merik's sailors. The third book in the series, Bloodwitch, was released on February 12, 2019, followed by the fourth book, Witchshadow, in 2021. In 2025, the finale of the series, Witchlight, was released.

Between Witchshadow and Witchlight's releases, Dennard published The Luminaries, a contemporary trilogy set in the haunted town of Hemlock Falls. Prior to the publishing, Dennard hosted a "choose your own adventure" story following Winnie, the protagonist of The Luminaries, on Twitter/X.

In 2025, The Executioners Three was published, a spooky historical fiction which had begun its life as a free story on Wattpad. Dennard announced her next book would be a mystery called Four & Twenty Blackbirds, followed by Two For Joy in the Lakeside Murders series.

In the meantime, Dennard opted for the indie route to publish the reboot of her original trilogy with the first book called Strange & Deadly, re-published October 2026. The rest of the trilogy is set to follow, all under the indie umbrella. Dennard from here on out is considered a hybrid author, being both traditionally and independently published.

Dennard also runs a blog and newsletter called "Misfits & Daydreamers," offering tips for helping aspiring authors write novels, find agents, and earn publishing deals. The guide articles involve steps for planning a novel, the revising process, the steps to expect when querying for an agent, and working with that agent to sell the book.

== Adaptations ==
On September 2, 2018, at Dragon Con panel attended by Dennard, it was announced that The Jim Henson Company would adapt the Witchlands series for television.

== Bibliography ==
=== Something Strange and Deadly ===
- Something Strange and Deadly (2012)
- A Darkness Strange and Lovely (2013)
- Strange and Ever After (2014)
- A Dawn Most Wicked (novella, 2013)

=== The Witchlands ===
- Truthwitch (2016)
- Windwitch (2017)
- Sightwitch (novella, 2018)
- Bloodwitch (2019)
- Witchshadow (2021)
- Witchlight (2025)

=== The Luminaries ===
- The Luminaries (2022)
- The Hunting Moon (2023)
- The Whispering Night (2024)

=== The Murder Quartet ===
- Four & Twenty Blackbirds (2027)
- Two for Joy (2027)

=== The Strange & Deadly Series ===
- Strange & Deadly (2026), a reboot of the 2012 Something Strange and Deadly

=== Short stories ===
- "Shirley & Jim" in Because You Love to Hate Me: 13 Tales of Villainy, edited by Amerie (2017)

=== Other ===
- The Starkillers Cycle (2014, free online book posted on tumblr, co-written by Sarah J. Maas)
- The Executioners Three (2025)
