= Sean Patrick Hazlett =

American author (born 1975)

Sean Patrick Hazlett CFA
- Born: November 17, 1975 (age 50); Wilmington, Delaware
- Education: MBA, Harvard Business School MPP, Harvard Kennedy School of Government AB, History, Stanford University BS, Electrical Engineering, Stanford University
- Writing career
- Genres: Horror, science fiction, and fantasy

Sean Patrick Hazlett (born November 17, 1975) is an American horror, science fiction, and fantasy author, editor, and futurist.

== Biography ==
Sean Patrick Hazlett was born in Wilmington, Delaware on November 17, 1975. He is an Army veteran who served in the 11th Armored Cavalry Regiment at the National Training Center in Fort Irwin, California. He holds degrees in Electrical Engineering and History from Stanford, an MBA from Harvard Business School, and a Master in Public Policy from the Harvard Kennedy School of Government. His Master's thesis at the Kennedy School focused on policy options for Iran's nuclear program under the supervision of former Secretary of Defense Ashton B. Carter.

Hazlett was a winner of the Writers of the Future Contest for his short story, "Adramelech". He was honored on April 4, 2017, at the 33rd Annual L. Ron Hubbard Achievement Awards and in the company of eleven other winners of the contest (Andrew L. Roberts, Andrew Peery, Anton Rose, C. L. Kagmi, Doug C. Souza, Dustin Steinacker, Jake Marley, Sean Patrick Hazlett, Stephen Lawson, Ville Merilainen, Walter Dinjos, and Ziporah Hildebrandt) and two finalists (David VonAllmen and Molly Elizabeth Atkins).

He hosts the podcast Through a Glass Darkly about the paranormal, UAPs, parapsychology, and geopolitics where he interviewed historian Norman M. Naimark, psychologist Bernard D. Beitman, and remote viewer David Morehouse among others.

== Bibliography ==
=== Short Stories and Novellas ===
==== 2013 ====
- “Movement to First Contact“, Plasma Frequency Magazine 4 (February/March 2013)
- “Remember New Roanoke“, The Colored Lens 8 (Summer 2013)
- “Cerebral Vortex“, NewMyths.com 24 (September 2013)
- “Spirals and Starways“, Plasma Frequency Magazine 8 (October/November 2013)
- “Shooting Stars and Schadenfreude“, Mad Scientist Journal: Autumn 2013

==== 2014 ====
- “The Witchwood Whispers“, Mad Scientist Journal: Winter 2014
- “Enemy Allies”, Fictionvale Magazine: Episode Three (May 2014)
- “White Nights, Mammon’s City“, NewMyths.com 28 (September 2014)

==== 2015 ====
- “Entropic Order“, Outposts of Beyond #7 (January 2015)
- “Chandler’s Hollow“, Perihelion Online Science Fiction Magazine, (March 12, 2015)
- “Boomer Hunter“, Grimdark Magazine, Issue #5 (October 2015)
- “Hill of Souls “, Outposts of Beyond #10 (October 2015)
- “Skin “, Kasma SF Magazine, (November 15, 2015)

==== 2016 ====
- “Tunguska “, Kasma SF Magazine, (January 15, 2016)
- “Close Encounter in Coyote Canyon “, Kasma SF Magazine, (June 15, 2016)
- “The Decision“, Sci Phi Journal, (July 7, 2016)
- “Chasing A.M.I.E.“, The Overcast, Episode 36, (August 3, 2016)
- “Quantum Shadows “, Stupefying Stories Showcase, (October 3, 2016)
- “Pinned “, Kasma SF Magazine, (December 3, 2016)
- “Twinwalkers“, Unnerving Magazine, Issue #1 (December 2016)

==== 2017 ====
- “We Hit Back“, Abyss & Apex, Issue #61 (January 1, 2017)
- “Mukden ”, Weirdbook, Issue #34 (February 9, 2017)
- “Adramelech”, Writers of the Future, Volume #33 (Galaxy Press: April 2017)
- “Evolution’s Echo”, Dark Moon Digest, Issue #27 (Perpetual Motion Machine Publishing: April 2017)
- "Titan's Twins ", Speculate! (Evil Girlfriend Media: April 2017)
- "The Sultan's Cellar", Galaxy's Edge, Issue #28 (Arc Manor / Phoenix Pick: September 2017)
- "Portal in Pasadena ", Disturbed Digest #18 (September 2017)
- “Roses in Winter ", Kasma SF Magazine, (November 2, 2017)
- “SWARM", Terraform, (December 8, 2017)
- "The Post-Apocalyptic Tourist's Guide to the Mojave Desert," The Post-Apocalyptic Tourist Guide, Series #1, Episode #4 (December 13, 2017)

==== 2018 ====
- "The Godhead Grimoire," Galaxy's Edge, Issue #30 (Arc Manor / Phoenix Pick: January 2018)
- "The Ninth Circle," Bards and Sages Quarterly, Volume 10, Issue 3 (July 2018)

==== 2019 ====
- "Murder and Mayhem", Mythic Magazine , Issue #8 (Founders House Publishing LLC: January 2019)
- "Hellhold" Galaxy's Edge, Issue #37 (Arc Manor / Phoenix Pick: March 2019)
- “The Red Oleander Murders“, Abyss & Apex, Issue #71 (July 1, 2019)
- "We Who Flee the Sun", Galaxy's Edge, Issue #40 (Arc Manor / Phoenix Pick: September 2019)
- "The White", Tell-Tale Press, (October 1, 2019)
- "Radix Malorum", Vastarien, Vol. 2, Issue 3 (Grimscribe Press: Fall 2019)
- "Serpent's Wall", Curiosities, Issue #6 (December 2019)

==== 2020 ====
- "The Pogonip Fog" Galaxy's Edge, Issue #42 (Arc Manor / Phoenix Pick: January 2020)
- "My Sanctuary of Solitude ", Kasma SF Magazine, (February 8, 2020)
- "Parley", MYTHIC: A Quarterly Science Fiction & Fantasy Magazine , Issue #13 (Founders House Publishing LLC: June 2020)
- "Santa's Last Interview", Bards and Sages Quarterly, Volume 12, Issue 4 (October 2020)
- "The Demon Piper of Holy Hill", MYTHIC: A Quarterly Science Fiction & Fantasy Magazine , Issue #15 (Founders House Publishing LLC: October 2020)

==== 2021 ====
- "Scion of the Swarm" Galaxy's Edge, Issue #48 (Arc Manor / Phoenix Pick: January 2021)
- "The Killer App", MYTHIC: A Quarterly Science Fiction & Fantasy Magazine, Issue #17 (Founders House Publishing LLC: October 2021)
- "Beneath Oblivion's Black Stars", 99 Tiny Terrors (Pulse Publishing: October 2021)
- "Mandible", Tales to Terrify, Episode 512, (November 19, 2021)

==== 2022 ====
- “Manchurian", Robosoldiers: Thank You for Your Servos (Baen: June 2022)
- "Hell's Well", Systema Paradoxa, Volume #13 (NeoParadoxa: October 2022)
- "They Only Dig at Night", Worlds Long Lost (Baen: December 2022)

==== 2024 ====
- "Radioaktivität", Weird World War: China (Baen: January 2024)

==== 2025 ====
- "Fulda", Wyrd Warfare (Raconteur Press Anthologies: March 2025)

=== Reprints ===
- "Adramelech”, Year’s Best Hardcore Horror: Volume 3
- “Adramelech”, Heinous Concoction: Digital Horror Fiction at DigitalFictionPub.com
- "Adramelech", MYTHIC: A Quarterly Science Fiction & Fantasy Magazine, Issue #18 (Founders House Publishing LLC: February 2022)
- "Adramelech," Grimdark Magazine, Issue #31 (July 2022)
- “SWARM”, The Year's Best Military and Adventure SF: Volume 4 (Baen: June 2018)
- “SWARM”, Ten Years Later (Sergeant Frosty Publications: February 2023)
- “Tunguska”, Kasma Magazine: 10 Years of SF! Volume 1
- “Boomer Hunter”, Quickfic at DigitalFictionPub.com
- “Boomer Hunter”, Knee-Deep in Grit: Two Bloody Years of Grimdark Fiction
- “Boomer Hunter”, Up and Coming: Stories by the 2016 Campbell-Eligible Authors
- “The Decision”, Planetary: Mars
- "The Godhead Grimoire", Year’s Best Hardcore Horror: Volume 4
- “Chandler’s Hollow”, Up and Coming: Stories by the 2016 Campbell-Eligible Authors
- “Entropic Order”, Up and Coming: Stories by the 2016 Campbell-Eligible Authors
- "Mukden", Tales for the Camp Fire: A Charity Anthology Benefitting Wildfire Relief
- "Radix Malorum", Year’s Best Hardcore Horror: Volume 5
- “The Demon Piper of Holy Hil l“, The Best of MYTHIC: Volume One (Founders House Publishing LLC: April 2021)
- “The Pogonip Fog“, Year’s Best Hardcore Horror: Volume 6
- "Hellhold", MYTHIC: A Quarterly Science Fiction & Fantasy Magazine, Issue #20 (Founders House Publishing LLC: January / February 2023)
- “Serpent’s Wall”, Building A Better Future (Sergeant Frosty Publications: March 2022)
- "Mandible," Bullet Points 11

=== Collections ===
==== 2015 ====
- Alien Abattoir and Other Stories (Promethium Press: April 2015)

==== 2025 ====
- Necromancer: And Other Stories (Promethium Enterprises: October 2025)
- Hellhold: And Other Stories (Promethium Enterprises: October 2025)

=== Anthologies ===
==== 2020 ====
- Weird World War III (Baen: October 2020)

==== 2022 ====
- Weird World War IV (Baen: March 2022)

==== 2024 ====
- Weird World War: China (Baen: January 2024)
