= D. J. Butler =

American speculative fiction author

- Born: David John Butler
- Education: Brigham Young University; New York University School of Law (JD)
- Spouse: Emily Butler
- Children: 3
- Writing career
- Years active: 2010–present
- Genres: Fantasy; Horror; Science fiction; Steampunk
- Notable works: Witchy Eye; Witchy Winter; Witchy Kingdom
- Notable awards: AML Award (2018); Whitney Award (2018); Dragon Award (2020)
- Website: davidjohnbutler.com

David John Butler is an American speculative fiction author, editor, publisher, and podcaster. His epic flintlock fantasy novel Witchy Kingdom won the Dragon Award for Best Alternate History Novel in 2020. Witchy Winter won the 2018 AML Award for Best Novel and the 2018 Whitney Award for Best Speculative Fiction, and Witchy Eye was a preliminary nominee for the Gemmell Morningstar Award.

== Life and career ==
Butler attended the New York University School of Law, earning his Juris Doctor in 1999. He is married to Emily Butler, and has four children. He spent over a decade working as a lawyer for companies including Micron Technology before opening an independent firm in 2010. He is employed as a corporate trainer, using his skills as a storyteller to educate business people. He began pursuing his childhood dream of being an author in 2010. His steampunk Western novel, City of Saints, was a 2012 Whitney Award finalist in the speculative fiction category.

In 2017, Baen published the first of Butler's American epic flintlock fantasy series, Witchy Eye, set in an alternate 1815 America. It was a finalist for a Dragon Award in 2017 and was a preliminary nominee for a Gemmell Morningstar Award in 2018. The second book in the series, Witchy Winter, won the 2018 AML Award for Best Novel, the 2018 Whitney Award for Best Speculative Fiction, and was a finalist for the 2018 Dragon Award for Best Alternate History Novel. Witchy Kingdom won the Dragon Award for Best Alternate History Novel in 2020.

In addition to being an author, Butler is Editor-in-Chief at Plain and Precious Publishing. Previously, he served as Senior Editor at Ark Press, Consulting Editor at Baen Books, and Acquisitions Editor for WordFire Press.

In 2025, after the Grand Blanc Township church attack, in which a man burned down a meetinghouse of the Church of Jesus Christ of Latter Day Saints and shot and killed four people, Butler, who himself is a LDS member, set up a fundraising page for the man's family. In less than two weeks, three hundred eighty thousand dollars were donated from nine thousand five hundred people. He said he set up the page because "Jesus tells us that we should do this. We should love our enemies, that we should mourn with those that mourn, that we should care for the widow and the orphan"

== Bibliography ==
=== The Buza System ===
- Crecheling (February 2015, WordFire Press)
- Urbane (July 2016, WordFire Press, ISBN 9781614754268)

=== City of Saints ===
Alternate history Civil War era featuring secret agents Samuel Clemens and Edgar Allan Poe trying to obtain the plans for airship and ray gun technology.

1. Liahona (June 2012, self, ebook only, no ISBN)
2. Deseret (July 2012, self, ebook only, no ISBN)
3. Timpanogos (August 2012, self, ebook only, no ISBN)
4. Teancum (September 2012, self, ebook only, no ISBN)

An omnibus, collecting all four novels, was also published:

- City of Saints (omnibus, November 2015, WordFire Press, ISBN 978-1-61475-347-6)

=== The Extraordinary Journeys of Clockwork Charlie ===
A clockwork boy, Charlie Pondicherry, has various adventures. This is a middle grade series.

- The Kidnap Plot (June 2016, Knopf, ISBN 978-0-553-51295-3)
- The Giant's Seat (June 2017, Knopf, ISBN 978-0-553-51299-1)
- The Library Machine (September 2018, Knopf, ISBN 978-0-553-51303-5)

=== Hiram Woolley ===
- The Cunning Man with Aaron Michael Ritchey (November 2019, Baen, ISBN 9781982124168)
- The Jupiter Knife with Aaron Michael Ritchey (February 2021, Baen, ISBN 9781982125189)
- The Familiar Spirit with Aaron Michael Ritchey (October 2025, Baen, ISBN 9781668072929)
- "The Seven Nipples of Molly Kitchen", in The Chronicles of Davids edited by David Afsharirad (September 2019, Baen, ISBN 978-1-4814-8426-8)
- "The Greatest Horse Thief in History", in Straight Outta Deadwood edited by David Boop (October 2019, Baen, ISBN 978-1-4814-8432-9)
- "The Dead Who Care", in Parallel Worlds: The Heroes Within edited by L. J. Hachmeister and R.R. Virdi (October 2019, Source 7, ISBN 978-1-69839-186-1)
- "Thirsty Bones", in Twilight Tales edited by Jaleta Clegg and Joe Monson (February 2021, Hemelein Publications, ISBN 978-1-64278-004-8)
- "Upon the Bells of the Horses", in The Florilegium of Madness edited by Callie Butler and Joe Monson (July 2021, Hemelein Publications, ISBN 978-1-64278-008-6)
- "The Hearts of the Children", in The Florilegium of Madness edited by Callie Butler and Joe Monson (July 2021, Hemelein Publications, ISBN 978-1-64278-008-6)
- "The Lord Set a Mark", in And Then It Got Weird: An Anthology of Paranormal Peculiarities edited by Jamie Ibson (October 2021, Blood Moon Press, ISBN 978-1-64855-224-3)

=== Indrajit and Fix ===
- "The Path of the Hunter" in Negotiation edited by Kacey Ezell and Marisa Wolf (October 2019, Seventh Seal Press, ISBN 978-1-950420-57-5)
- "No Trade for Nice Guys" in When Valor Must Hold edited by Rob Howell and Chris Kennedy (February 2020, New Mythology Press, ISBN 978-1-950420-97-1)
- In the Palace of Shadow and Joy (July 2020, Baen, ISBN 9781982124700)
- "The Lady in the Pit" in No Game for Knights (September 2022, Baen, ISBN 978-1-982192-08-2)
- Between Princesses and Other Jobs (July 2023, Baen, ISBN 1982192690)
- Among the Gray Lords (January 2024, Baen, ISBN 1982193131)

=== Rock Band Fights Evil ===
- Hellhound on My Trail (February 2015, WordFire Press, ISBN 978-1-61475-293-6)
- Snake Handlin' Man (February 2015, WordFire Press, ISBN 978-1-61475-301-8)
- Crow Jane (February 2015, WordFire Press, ISBN 978-1-61475-299-8)
- Devil Sent the Rain (February 2015, WordFire Press, ISBN 978-1-61475-258-5)
- This World Is Not My Home (June 2016, WordFire Press, ISBN 978-1-61475-406-0)
- The Good Son (July 2016, WordFire Press, ISBN 978-1-61475-390-2)
- Earth Angel (July 2016, WordFire Press, ISBN 978-1-61475-392-6)
- All Along the Watchtower (May 2024, WordFire Press, ISBN 978-1680576160)

Two omnibuses collect the first six novels:

- Band on the Run (vol. 1–3, March 2016, WordFire Press, ISBN 978-1-61475-388-9)
- The Road to Hell (vols. 4–6, April 2017, WordFire Press, ISBN 978-1-61475-560-9)

=== The Witchy War ===
Alternate history flintlock fantasy set in the early 1800s North America.

- "Dei Britannici", a prequel short story in Free Stories 2017 (2017, Baen.com)

==== Witchy Eye series ====
- Witchy Eye (March 2017, Baen, ISBN 978-1-4767-8211-9)
- Witchy Winter (April 2018, Baen, ISBN 978-1-4814-8314-8)
- Witchy Kingdom (August 2019, Baen, ISBN 9781481484152)
- Serpent Daughter (November 2020, Baen, ISBN 9781982124977)

=== Time Trials ===
- Time Trials with M. A. Rothman (March 2023, Baen, ISBN 9781982192488)
- Ice Trials with M. A. Rothman (December 2024, Baen, ISBN 978-1982193805)

=== Other Fiction ===
- Press Forward Saints, Mormon steampunk anthology edited by Butler (March 2019, Immortal Works, ISBN 978-1-09-482572-4)
- The Wilding Probate (October 2020, Immortal Works, ISBN 978-1-953491-05-3)
- The Florilegium of Madness, collection of short fiction (July 2021, Hemelein Publications, ISBN 978-1-64278-008-6)
- Abbott in Darkness (May 2022, Baen, ISBN 9781982126094)
- The Chrestomathy of Desire, collection of short fiction (July 2025, Hemelein Publications, ISBN 978-1-64278-067-3)
- Hell on Wheels with David J. West (June 2026, Baen ISBN 9781964856667)

=== Nonfiction ===
- The Politically Incorrect Guide to Science Fiction and Fantasy, (April 2025, Regnery, ISBN 1684515416)

== Critical reception ==
The writing in Time Trials, co-authored with M. A. Rothman, was described as "highly enjoyable" and "entertaining", having well-developed characters, and praised for "refreshingly [showing] respect for ancient civilizations and their accomplishments".

== Awards and honors ==
Butler has received the following awards and honors:

Year	Organization	Award title, Category	Work	Result	Refs
2012	Storymakers	Whitney Award, Best Speculative Fiction	City of Saints	Finalist	
2016	Association for Mormon Letters	AML Award, Middle Grade Novel	The Kidnap Plot	Finalist	
2017	Dragon Con	Dragon Award, Best Alternate History Novel	Witchy Eye	Finalist	
2018	DGLA	Gemmell Award, Morningstar Award	Witchy Eye	Preliminary nominee	
2018	Association for Mormon Letters	AML Award, Novel	Witchy Winter	Won	
2018	Dragon Con	Dragon Award, Best Alternate History Novel	Witchy Winter	Finalist	
2018	Storymakers	Whitney Award, Best Speculative Fiction	Witchy Winter	Won	
2019	Association for Mormon Letters	AML Award, Novel	The Cunning Man (with Aaron Michael Ritchey)	Finalist	
2020	Dragon Con	Dragon Award, Best Alternate History Novel	Witchy Kingdom	Won	
2021	Association for Mormon Letters	AML Award, Novel	The Jupiter Knife (with Aaron Michael Ritchey)	Finalist	
