= Step By Bloody Step =

2022 comic book limited series

- Cover of Step By Bloody Step #1

Publication information
- Publisher: Image Comics
- Schedule: Monthly
- Format: Limited series
- Publication date: February – June 2022
- No. of issues: 4

Creative team
- Written by: Si Spurrier
- Artist(s): Matheus Lopes; Matias Bergara

Step By Bloody Step is a four-issue textless comic book miniseries published in 2022 by Image Comics.

== Synopsis ==
The series follows armored giant guarding a helpless child.

== Issues ==
#	Publication date	Comic Book Roundup rating
1	February 23, 2022	9.5 by 14 professional critics.
2	March 30, 2022	9.4 by 7 professional critics.
3	April 27, 2022	9.5 by 5 professional critics.
4	June 1, 2022	9.8 by 5 professional critics.

== Reception ==
Dustin Holland from Comic Book Resources, reviewing the debut, praised artist Bergar. Caitlin Rosberg from The A.V. Club gave the first issue an "A−" and emphasized the chemistry between the writer and the artist. Oliver Sava from Polygon was also pleased with the debut.
