= Brian Niemeier =

American writer

- Education: Bradley University (BA); Franciscan University of Steubenville (MA)
- Occupation: Writer
- Writing career
- Language: English
- Years active: 2012–present
- Genres: Horror, science fiction
- Notable awards: Campbell Award (nom, 2016)
- Website: www.brianniemeier.com

Brian Niemeier is an American science fiction horror author. In 2016, he was a finalist for the John W. Campbell Award for Best New Writer and won the inaugural Dragon Award for Best Horror Novel.

== Background ==
Brian Niemeier grew up in Peoria, Illinois. He attended Bradley University in Peoria for his undergraduate work, then earned an MA at the Franciscan University of Steubenville.

== Writing career ==
Niemeier was a finalist for the John W. Campbell Award for Best New Writer in 2016, which he said was a result of his having been selected by the Sad Puppies and Rabid Puppies campaigns. The award voters ranked him sixth of five nominees, below "No Award". His second novel, Souldancer, won the inaugural Dragon Award for Best Horror Novel. When Niemeier's novel The Secret Kings was nominated at the 2017 Dragon Awards, The Verge contributor Andrew Liptak cited the book's low ratings at Goodreads (numbering 11 at the time) when discussing whether or not the Dragons were actually rewarding the works most popular with fans. Niemeier has since stated that the Dragon Awards have been taken over by the "Death Cult" by which he alleges the Hugo Awards are controlled, and that this cult "took advantage of the drastically reduced voter base to pack the ballot" in 2020. Mike Glyer, of File 770, described Niemeier as negatively spinning the results of the 2020 Dragon Awards because Niemeier's friends didn't win.

== Bibliography ==
Works are listed chronologically in each section. All of his works are self-published unless otherwise noted.

=== Combat Frame Xseed series ===
1. Combat Frame Xseed (December 2018)
2. Coalition Year 40 (May 2019)
3. CY 40 Second Coming (December 2019)

Other books in this series

- Combat Frame Xseed S (October 2020)
- Combat Frame Xseed SS (November 2021)
- Combat Frame Ƶ XSeed (May 2023)

A non-fiction guide to the series was also published:

- Combat Frame Xseed Illustrated Combat Frame Tech Guide (November 2020, ISBN 9798652482589)

=== Soul Cycle series ===
1. Nethereal (June 2015, ISBN 978-1-5142-9921-0)
2. Souldancer (February 2016, ISBN 978-1-5300-2133-8)
3. The Secret Kings (December 2016, ISBN 978-1-5412-1057-8)
4. The Ophian Rising (December 2017, ISBN 978-1-9735-5797-5)

=== Nonfiction ===
- Don't Give Money to People Who Hate You (April 2020, ISBN 979-8-6386-1347-1)

=== Collections ===
- Strange Matter (April 2018, ebook only)

=== Short works ===
- "Beta Geminorum" (January 2012, Jersey Devil Press)
- "Reign of Terror" (April 2012, in Title Goes Here)
- "Strange Matter" (January 2015, in Sci Phi Journal #3, edited by Jason Rennie, Robert J. Wigard, and Peter Sean Bradley, ISBN 978-0-9941758-3-0)
- "Izcacus" (October 2015)
- "Anacyclosis" (2016, in "Sci Phi Journal")
- "Hymn of the Pearl" (novella, June 2017, ebook only)
- "Elegy for the Locust"
- "Robber Council"
- "Good Friday"

== Awards ==
Year	Organization	Award title, Category	Work	Result	Refs
2016	World Science Fiction Society	John W. Campbell Award for Best New Writer	–	Finalist	
2016	Dragon Con	Dragon Award, Best Horror Novel	Souldancer	Won	
