= Livesuit =

2024 book

- Author: James S. A. Corey
- Language: English
- Series: The Captive's War
- Genre: Military science fiction, Space opera
- Publisher: Orbit Books
- Publication date: October 1, 2024
- Publication place: United States
- Media type: E-book, Audiobook
- ISBN: 9780356526379
- Preceded by: The Mercy of Gods

Livesuit is a 2024 science fiction novella by the writing duo James S. A. Corey (Daniel Abraham and Ty Franck). It is a standalone story set in the universe of their trilogy The Captive's War, which began with the novel The Mercy of Gods.

The novella centers around a unit of soldiers equipped with livesuits, exoskeleton armor that fully encases its wearer and which can ensure combat readiness through extreme conditions, including otherwise lethal injuries. While the story is set in the same universe as the main trilogy, it depicts a human civilization that exists separately from the one featured in The Mercy of Gods. This more technologically advanced civilization is embroiled in a decades long interstellar war against an unnamed enemy.

== Plot summary ==
Livesuit follows Kirin Foss, an EMT on a relatively peaceful human world, who enlists in the interplanetary war against an unnamed enemy alongside his colleague Piotr for an eight-year tour of duty. Both are equipped with the eponymous livesuits: semibiological armor that enhances physical ability, permits operation in any environment including vacuum, and possesses remarkable regenerative properties, allowing the wearer to survive lethal injuries.

The narrative is structured nonlinearly. Over the course of several combat missions, Kirin and his unit experience significant time dilation from faster-than-light travel. A censored message from a former lover, Mina — now dead of old age while Kirin has aged less than four years — forces him to confront the true scale of his displacement from civilian life.

The story's central revelation unfolds when Kirin, examining a foot injury sustained in combat, discovers that his suit has replaced the foot and most of the leg with its own biological material. Scanning Piotr, who has communicated only by text since an early severe injury, he realizes that Piotr has long been dead — his body animated entirely by the suit. Kirin connects this with other soldiers who have undergone dramatic personality changes and realizes what Mina was attempting to warn him of: livesuits cannot be removed. They progressively incorporate themselves into the wearer's body, eventually subsuming it. The promised eight-year tour is a fabrication: no livesuit soldier ever returns home. The novella closes with Kirin wondering how long it will take for his suit to recognize that he has understood the truth and kill him.
