= Lou Antonelli =

American speculative fiction author (1957–2021)

- Antonelli in 2010
- Born: Louis Sergio Antonelli; January 6, 1957; Medford, Massachusetts, United States
- Died: October 6, 2021 (aged 64); Clarksville, Texas, United States
- Education: Columbia University
- Occupations: Author, journalist

Louis Sergio Antonelli (January 6, 1957 – October 6, 2021) was an American speculative fiction author who wrote primarily alternate history, secret history, science fiction, and fantasy. He resided in Clarksville, Texas. Antonelli's stories have been published in print publications based in the United States, the United Kingdom, Australia, and Canada, as well as e-zines based in India and Portugal.

== Early life ==
Antonelli was born in Medford, Massachusetts and grew up in Rockland. As a young man, he attended Columbia University and lived in New York City.

In 1982, at the age of 25, Antonelli ran as a Republican for the United States House of Representatives in a district including most of the West Side of Manhattan Island along with parts of The Bronx. He lost to the Democratic incumbent Ted Weiss by a margin of 85%–15%.

In 1985, Antonelli moved to Texas. In 1992, he was elected to a term as a member of the Cedar Hill ISD school board and served until 1995.

In 2020, he ran for Congress in Texas's 4th congressional district as a Libertarian, winning 1.9% of the vote.

== Writing career ==
Antonelli was a professional journalist. In January 2015, he was named managing editor of The Clarksville Times based in Clarksville, Texas.

Antonelli got a late start in his fiction writing career; his first story ("Silvern" in the June 2003 issue of RevolutionSF) was published when he was 46 years old. His first professional sale was "A Rocket for the Republic", published in Asimov's Science Fiction in September 2005. His 2012 short story "Great White Ship" was nominated for the Sidewise Award for Alternate History.

As of June October 2017, he had 112 short stories published either in print or online. His stories have appeared in Asimov's Science Fiction, Worlds of Wonder, Jim Baen's Universe, Continuum Science Fiction, Astounding Tales, Bewildering Stories, Andromeda Spaceways In-flight Magazine, Nova Science Fiction, Planetary Stories, Aphelion, Ray Gun Revival, 4 Star Stories, Drink Tank, Nova Science Fiction, Omni Reboot, the Song Stories anthology, the FenCon IV Souvenir Program Book, and other publications.

Eleven of his stories have received honorable mentions in The Year's Best Science Fiction published by St. Martin's Press for 2011, 2009, 2008, 2006, 2005 and 2004. "A Rocket for the Republic" placed third in the Asimov's Science Fiction Readers Poll for 2005 in the Short Story category. His 2012 short story "Great White Ship" was nominated for the Sidewise Award for Alternate History. "On a Spiritual Plain" (originally published in Sci-Phi Journal No. 2, November 2014) was nominated for Hugo Award for Best Short Story in 2015, as part of the Sad Puppies ballot manipulation campaign. His debut novel, "Another Girl, Another Planet", was nominated for the Dragon Award for Best Alternate History novel in 2017.

== Bibliography ==
=== Novel ===
- Another Girl, Another Planet (2016)

=== Collections ===
- Fantastic Texas (2009)
- Texas & Other Planets (2010)
- Music for Four Hands with Edward Morris (2011)
- The Clock Struck None (2014)

=== Non-Fiction ===
- Letters from Gardner (2014)

=== Anthologies ===
- The First Bewildering Stories Anthology (2006, Adventure Books, ISBN 1-4116-8538-5, paperback, 164 pages)
- Zombified: An Anthology of All Things Zombie (2011, Sky Warrior, ISBN 0-615-91027-0, paperback, 206 pages)
- Zombie Writing (2012, Create Space, ISBN 1-4699-3147-8, paperback, 160 pages)
- Song Stories: Volume 1 (2013, Song Story Press, ASIN B00BTZRVIE, e-book, 196 pages)
- Raygun Chronicles: Space Opera for a New Age (2013, Every Day Publishing, ISBN 0-9881257-5-7, hardcover, 360 pages)

== 2015 Hugo Awards controversy ==
In July 2015, in the midst of the "Sad Puppies/Rabid Puppies" controversy, Antonelli (whose nomination for the Hugo Award for Best Short Story was part of both "Puppies" slates for the Hugo ballot) wrote a letter to the Spokane Police Department telling them to be on the lookout for World science fiction convention Guest of Honor David Gerrold (who was scheduled to be master of ceremonies at the award ceremony in Spokane) as a person who may incite violence calling him "insane and a public danger and needs to be watched when the convention’s going on."

Antonelli later apologized, and Gerrold accepted the apology, saying "Let's put this one to bed, once and for all. Lou Antonelli did something dumb. People were outraged. Someone who cared about him held up a mirror and he recognized he was (in his words) turning into his own crazy uncle. He apologized. I'm satisfied that his apology was sincere. And that should be the end of it."

== Personal life ==
He was married to Patricia (Randolph) Antonelli, a Dallas native.

Antonelli died suddenly at the age of 64 at his residence in Clarksville, Texas.
