= Inkshares =

American publishing and rights management company

- Founded: 2013
- Founders: Thaddeus Woodman, Lawrence Levitsky, Adam Gomolin, and Jeremy Thomas
- Country of origin: United States
- Headquarters location: Oakland, California
- Distribution: Ingram Publisher Services
- Publication types: Books
- Official website: inkshares.com

Inkshares is a publishing and literary rights-management platform founded in 2013. It is an open platform with a community of over 100,000 authors and readers. Authors post partial manuscripts which are sorted based on reader interest. Selected manuscripts are edited by Inkshares for publishing in North America, sale into foreign territories, and development in television and film.

Inkshares investors include Ingram Ventures, Indicator Ventures, and prominent angels in the media and entertainment space. Inkshares has strategic relationships with Ingram for North American book distribution and The United Talented Agency for representation and packaging in television and film.

== Founding ==
=== Founders and founding ===
Inkshares was founded in 2013 by Thaddeus Woodman, Lawrence Levitsky, Adam Gomolin, and Jeremy Thomas. The original notion for Inkshares was developed by Woodman, whose parents founded a successful computer-book publishing company called Ventana Press in the 1990s. Spurred by the success of Kickstarter and the promise of the equity crowdfunding provisions of the JOBS Act, Woodman initially sought to create an equity crowdfunding portal for books.

Woodman discussed the concept with Levitsky, a former founding vice president of RealNetworks, who had worked at Ventana Press with Woodman's parents after running Microsoft Press. Levitsky introduced Woodman to Gomolin, a securities attorney and represented screenwriter. In late 2013, they hired Thomas as a co-founder and Chief Technical Officer.

=== Funding rounds ===
Woodman, Gomolin, and Levitsky raised a $250k friends-and-family round in late 2013. In the summer of 2014, Inkshares raised its first seed round with participation from Ingram Ventures (the venture arm of the largest book distributor in the world) and Indicator Ventures. The round also had participation from prominent publishing angels including Nion McEvoy, CEO of Chronicle Books.

Inkshares raised follow-on seed rounds in 2016 and 2017, including participation from 555 Capital and prominent Hollywood angels including Warner Brothers' President of Film and Chief Creative Officer Greg Silverman.

=== Early premise and formation ===
The original notion presented by Woodman was to create a platform akin to “Kickstarter meets Random House” but complete with the ability to sell shares in a book so that readers could participate in the revenue stream for titles. At the time, while the Jobs Act had directed the SEC to create “equity crowdfunding,” the SEC had yet to promulgate rules, ultimately doing so multiple years later. Inkshares initially launched without the equity component, receiving extensive press in outlets including Fast Company and Publishers Weekly.

== Evolution of Inkshares ==
=== Evolution of funding model ===
The original Inkshares model was premised on donations. Inkshares generated funding goals based on page length and projected design and print costs, and patrons could donate as much as they would like. Multiple successful projects were funded during this period, including The Astronaut Instruction Manual and The Show.

Beginning in 2015, Thomas, Woodman, and Gomolin moved the model from donations to pre-orders, starkly limiting the amount any one person could donate to a project. The first project to fund under this new model was Abomination, the debut novel of Gary Whitta, screenwriter of The Book of Eli and Star Wars: Rogue One. Though this “pre-order” model made it harder for books to fund, Thomas, Woodman, and Gomolin believed that it would stop the type of vanity publishing that frequently occurred on Kickstarter and help map to genuine reader interest. During this period, Levitsky left the company to pursue his own imprint.

In late 2016, Inkshares began measuring non-monetary engagement such as shares, likes, and total times spent by readers on selected manuscripts. The first book published on the basis of engagement rather than pre-orders was Devil’s Call by J. Danielle Dorn.

=== Evolution of rights management ===
By early 2016, Inkshares was experiencing significant growth in not just publishing but rights management. This had always been a significant focus for Gomolin, who had been represented in Hollywood and as Inkshares' general counsel had written rights-management contracts into Inkshares’ first contracts in 2014. In 2015, Inkshares sold the streaming television rights for Filip Syta's The Show to Blackpills in a large deal publicized by Business Insider. Immediately following this, Inkshares sold the audiobook rights to Penguin Random House in a six-figure deal that was rumoured to be the largest debut-author audio deal of the year. Later that year, Inkshares would sell Mike Mongo’s The Astronaut Instruction Manual to Legendary Entertainment and J-F Dubeau's A God in the Shed to Skydance. Inkshares would follow these deals with myriad more sales in 2017, including the seven-figure deal for Tal Klein's The Punch Escrow, now in development at Lionsgate.
