= List of award-winning graphic novels =

This is a list of graphic novels which have won a notable award.

== Pulitzer Prize winners ==
- 1992: Maus a.k.a. Maus: A Survivor's Tale — My Father Bleeds History by Art Spiegelman (Special Citation; ISBN 0-679-40641-7)
- 2025: Feeding Ghosts: A Graphic Memoir by Tessa Hulls (Memoir or Autobiography; ISBN 9780374601652)

=== Pulitzer-winning narrative comics later collected into books ===
- The 2018 Pulitzer Prize for Editorial Cartooning went to the series "Welcome to the New World" by Jake Halpern and Michael Sloan, published in the New York Times and then expanded into a 2020 book of the same name (ISBN 9781250305596)
- The 2022 Pulitzer Prize for Illustrated Reporting and Commentary went to "I Escaped a Chinese Internment Camp" by Fahmida Azim, Anthony Del Col, Josh Adams and Walt Hickey, published in Insider and later published as a 2024 book of the same name (ISBN 9781988247960).

== Hugo Award winners ==
- 1988: Watchmen by Alan Moore and Dave Gibbons (ISBN 0-930289-23-4), category "Other Forms"
- 2009: Girl Genius, Volume 8: Agatha Heterodyne and the Chapel of Bones by Kaja & Phil Foglio, art by Phil Foglio, colors by Cheyenne Wright (Airship Entertainment), Best Graphic Novel
- 2010: Girl Genius, Volume 9: Agatha Heterodyne and the Heirs of the Storm by Kaja & Phil Foglio, art by Phil Foglio, colors by Cheyenne Wright (Airship Entertainment), Best Graphic Story
- 2011: Girl Genius, Volume 10: Agatha Heterodyne and the Guardian Muse by Kaja & Phil Foglio, art by Phil Foglio, colors by Cheyenne Wright (Airship Entertainment), Best Graphic Story
- 2012: Digger by Ursula Vernon (writer, artist) (Sofawolf Press), Best Graphic Story
- 2013: Saga, Volume One by Brian K. Vaughan (writer), Fiona Staples (artist) (Image Comics), Best Graphic Story
- 2015: Ms. Marvel, Volume 1: No Normal by G. Willow Wilson (writer), Adrian Alphona (artist), Jake Wyatt (artist) (Marvel Comics), Best Graphic Story
- 2016: The Sandman: Overture by Neil Gaiman (writer), J. H. Williams III (artist) (Vertigo), Best Graphic Story
- 2017: Monstress, Volume 1: Awakening by Marjorie Liu (writer), Sana Takeda (artist) (Image Comics), Best Graphic Story
- 2018: Monstress, Volume 2: The Blood by Marjorie Liu (writer), Sana Takeda (artist) (Image Comics), Best Graphic Story
- 2019: Monstress, Volume 3: Haven by Marjorie Liu (writer), Sana Takeda (artist) (Image Comics), Best Graphic Story
- 2020: LaGuardia by Nnedi Okorafor (writer), Tana Ford (artist), James Devlin (colorist) (Berger Books/Dark Horse Comics), Best Graphic Story
- 2021: Parable of the Sower: A Graphic Novel Adaptation by Octavia E. Butler (original author), Damian Duffy (writer), John Jennings (artist), (Abrams Books), Best Graphic Story

== Bram Stoker Award winners ==
- 2000: The League of Extraordinary Gentlemen, Volume One by Alan Moore and Kevin O'Neill, category "Best Illustrated Narrative"
- 2003: The Sandman: Endless Nights by Neil Gaiman, category "Best Illustrated Narrative"
- 2011: Neonomicon by Alan Moore and Jacen Burrows, category "Best Graphic Novel"
- 2012: Witch Hunts: A Graphic History of the Burning Times by Rocky Wood and Lisa Morton, "Best Graphic Novel"
- 2013: Alabaster: Wolves by Caitlin R. Kiernan, "Best Graphic Novel"
- 2014: Bad Blood by Jonathan Maberry and Tyler Crook, "Best Graphic Novel"
- 2015: Shadow Show: Stories in Celebration of Ray Bradbury by Sam Weller, Mort Castle, Chris Ryall, and Carlos Guzman, "Best Graphic Novel"
- 2017: Kindred: A Graphic Novel Adaptation by Damian Duffy and Octavia E. Butler, "Best Graphic Novel"

== Guardian First Book Award winner ==
- 2001: Jimmy Corrigan, the Smartest Kid on Earth by Chris Ware

== Robert F. Kennedy Book Award ==
- 2014 Special Recognition: March: Book One by John Lewis, Andrew Aydin, & Nate Powell

== The Case Centre Awards & Competitions Winners ==
- 2019 Outstanding Compact Case Award Winner: Turbulence on the Tarmac, by Debapratim Purkayastha and Sid Ghosh (Non-fiction; Case Ref 519-0016-1)

== World Fantasy Award winner ==
- The Sandman: Dream Country contains a story by Neil Gaiman and Charles Vess, #19 "A Midsummer Night's Dream" that earned this award in 1991 as Best Short Fiction.
- Monstress Volume Six: The Vow by Marjorie Liu (writer) and Sana Takeda (artist), category "Special Award-- Professional"

== Sidewise Award winner ==
- 2004 Ministry of Space by Warren Ellis (writer) and Chris Weston (artist) (Image Comics), Best Short Form

== Ignatz Award winners ==
- Black Hole by Charles Burns
- Diary of a Mosquito Abatement Man by John Porcellino
- Tricked by Alex Robinson
- Persepolis 2: The Story of a Return by Marjane Satrapi
- Blankets by Craig Thompson
- Three Fingers by Rich Koslowski
- From Hell by Alan Moore and Eddie Campbell
- Cages by Dave McKean
- Ghost World by Daniel Clowes
- It's a Good Life, If You Don't Weaken by Seth
- Same Difference and Other Stories by Derek Kirk Kim

== Kirby Award for Best Graphic Album winners ==
- Beowulf (First Comics)
- The Rocketeer, by Dave Stevens (Eclipse Comics)
- Batman: The Dark Knight Returns, by Frank Miller and Klaus Janson (DC)

== Eisner Award / Harvey Award winners ==
=== Original graphic novels ===
- Acme Novelty Library #13, by Chris Ware
- Batman: The Killing Joke by Alan Moore and Brian Bolland
- Batman: War on Crime by Paul Dini and Alex Ross
- Batman & Superman Adventures: World's Finest by Paul Dini, Joe Staton and Terry Beatty
- Blankets by Craig Thompson
- The Cartoon History of the Universe III: From the Rise of Arabia to the Renaissance by Larry Gonick
- Ed the Happy Clown by Chester Brown
- Elektra Lives Again by Frank Miller
- Fairy Tales of Oscar Wilde Vol. 2, by Oscar Wilde and P. Craig Russell
- Fax from Sarajevo by Joe Kubert (ISBN 1-56971-346-4)
- Fun Home by Alison Bechdel
- Giant Days by John Allison and Max Sarin
- The Golem's Mighty Swing by James Sturm (ISBN 1-896597-71-8)
- Last Day in Vietnam by Will Eisner
- March: Book Two by John Lewis, Andrew Aydin, & Nate Powell
- The Name of the Game by Will Eisner
- One! Hundred! Demons! by Lynda Barry
- The Originals by Dave Gibbons
- Our Cancer Year by Harvey Pekar, Joyce Brabner and Frank Stack (non-fiction; ISBN 1-56858-011-8)
- Safe Area Goražde by Joe Sacco (non-fiction; ISBN 1-56097-470-2)
- Signal to Noise by Neil Gaiman and Dave McKean
- A Small Killing by Alan Moore and Oscar Zarate (ISBN 1-59291-009-2)
- Stuck Rubber Baby by Howard Cruse
- Superman: Peace on Earth by Paul Dini and Alex Ross
- Swallow Me Whole by Nate Powell
- This One Summer by Mariko Tamaki and Jillian Tamaki
- To the Heart of the Storm by Will Eisner
- Torso by Brian Michael Bendis and Marc Andreyko
- Understanding Comics by Scott McCloud (non-fiction)
- Why I Hate Saturn by Kyle Baker
- You Are Here by Kyle Baker

=== Comic-book compilations ===
- Astonishing X-Men: Gifted by Joss Whedon and John Cassaday
- Astro City: Life in the Big City by Kurt Busiek and Brent Anderson
- Batman: Black and White by various creators, ed. by Bob Kahan (ISBN 1-56389-332-0)
- Batman: Black & White, Volume Two by various creators, ed. by Mark Chiarello and Nick J. Napolitano (ISBN 1-56389-917-5)
- Batman: Dark Victory by Jeph Loeb and Tim Sale (ISBN 1-56389-868-3)
- Batman: The Long Halloween Jeph Loeb and Tim Sale (ISBN 1-56389-469-6)
- Batman Adventures: Dangerous Dames and Demons by Paul Dini, Bruce Timm, and others
- Blacksad 2 by Juanjo Guarnido and Juan Diaz Canales
- The Complete Bone Adventures (1994; ISBN 0-9636609-2-6), reissued in color as Bone: Out from Boneville (2005; ISBN 0-439-70640-8), by Jeff Smith
- Bone: One Volume Edition by Jeff Smith (ISBN 1-888963-14-X)
- Cages by Dave McKean
- Cerebus: Flight by Dave Sim and Gerhard
- From Hell by Alan Moore and Eddie Campbell
- Hellboy: Seed of Destruction by Mike Mignola
- Hellboy: The Wolves of Saint August by Mike Mignola
- Jimmy Corrigan, the Smartest Kid on Earth by Chris Ware
- Kings in Disguise by James Vance and Dan Burr. (ISBN 0-393-32848-1)
- Lone Wolf and Cub by Kazuo Koike and Goseki Kojima
- Louis Riel by Chester Brown
- Marvels by Kurt Busiek and Alex Ross
- Maus II a.k.a. Maus: A Survivor's Tale — And Here My Troubles Began by Art Spiegelman (non-fiction; ISBN 0-679-72977-1)
- Same Difference and Other Stories by Derek Kirk Kim
- Sandman: The Doll's House by Neil Gaiman and various artists
- Sin City a.k.a. Sin City: The Hard Goodbye by Frank Miller (ISBN 1-59307-293-7)
- Sin City: Family Values by Frank Miller (ISBN 1-59307-297-X)
- Sin City: That Yellow Bastard by Frank Miller (ISBN 1-59307-296-1)
- Stray Bullets: Innocence of Nihilism by David Lapham
- The Tale of One Bad Rat by Bryan Talbot
- Twentieth Century Eightball by Daniel Clowes
- Watchmen by Alan Moore and Dave Gibbons (ISBN 0-930289-23-4)
- Y: The Last Man by Brian K. Vaughan

== Kodansha Manga Award ==
- 1984: Akira by Katsuhiro Otomo
- 1986: Adolf by Osamu Tezuka and What's Michael? by Makoto Kobayashi (tie)
- 1993: Parasyte by Hitoshi Iwaaki
- 2000: Vagabond by Takehiko Inoue
- 2001: 20th Century Boys by Naoki Urasawa
- 2006: Mushishi by Yuki Urushibara
- 2009: Ah! My Goddess by Kōsuke Fujishima
- 2012: Vinland Saga by Makoto Yukimura
- 2015: Knights of Sidonia by Tsutomu Nihei

== Kirkus Prize ==
- 2019 Winner: New Kid by Jerry Craft

== National Book Award ==
=== Young People's Literature ===
- 2006 Finalist: American Born Chinese by Gene Luen Yang
- 2009 Finalist: Stitches by David Small
- 2013 Finalist: Boxers and Saints by Gene Luen Yang
- 2015 Finalist: Nimona by ND Stevenson
- 2016 Winner: March: Book Three by John Lewis, Andrew Aydin, & Nate Powell

== American Library Association Youth Media Awards ==
=== Newbery Medal ===
- 2015 Honor Book: El Deafo by Cece Bell
- 2016 Honor Book: Roller Girl by Victoria Jamieson
- 2020 Winner: New Kid by Jerry Craft

=== Caldecott Medal ===
- 2015 Honor Book: This One Summer by Mariko Tamaki and Jillian Tamaki

=== Coretta Scott King Book Award ===
- 2014 Author Honor: March: Book One by John Lewis, Andrew Aydin, & Nate Powell
- 2017 Author Winner: March: Book Three by John Lewis, Andrew Aydin, & Nate Powell
- 2020 Author Winner: New Kid by Jerry Craft

=== Michael L. Printz Award ===
- 2007 Winner: American Born Chinese by Gene Luen Yang
- 2015 Honor Book: This One Summer by Mariko Tamaki and Jillian Tamaki
- 2017 Winner: March: Book Three by John Lewis, Andrew Aydin, & Nate Powell
- 2025 Winner: Brownstone: A Graphic Novel by Samuel Teer and Mar Julia

=== Robert F. Sibert Informational Book Medal ===
- 2017 Winner: March: Book Three by John Lewis, Andrew Aydin, & Nate Powell

=== YALSA Nonfiction Award ===
- 2017 Winner: March: Book Three by John Lewis, Andrew Aydin, & Nate Powell

== See also ==
- List of graphic novels: Adapted into TV/film
- Doug Wright Awards
