= Bram Stoker Award for Best Graphic Novel =

Literary award

The Bram Stoker Award for Best Graphic Novel is an award presented by the Horror Writers Association (HWA) for "superior achievement" in horror writing for graphic novels.

== Criteria ==
Awards are given in each calendar year and books originally published between January 1 and December 31 of that year are eligible. The Horror Writers Association defines a graphic novel as "any trade paperback or hardcover book consisting of work of fiction in comic-book form; the work may be presented in an electronic form as well, provided the total length is equivalent to at least 48 printed pages." The work can be original or a collection of previously published issues, with the publication date of the collection determining eligibility not the individual issues. Only the author or authors of the work receive the award.

== Winners and nominees ==
The following are the winners and nominees. Nominees who were finalists are listed under the winner for each year, respectively.

The year of eligibility listed in the table is the year that the work was published; the ceremony when the honor was awarded happening the following year.

Bram Stoker Award for Best Graphic Novel
| Year | Recipient | Title | Result | Citation |
|---|---|---|---|---|
| 2011 | Alan Moore | Neonomicon | Winner | |
| 2011 | Vera Brosgol | Anya's Ghost | Nominee | |
| 2011 | Joe Hill | Locke & Key Volume 4 | Nominee | |
| 2011 | Jeff Jensen | Green River Killer | Nominee | |
| 2011 | Jonathan Maberry | Marvel Universe vs. Wolverine | Nominee | |
| 2011 | Christopher Golden and Mike Mignola | Baltimore Volume I: The Plague Ships | Nominee | |
| 2012 | Lisa Morton and Rocky Wood | Witch Hunts: A Graphic History of the Burning Times | Winner | |
| 2012 | Cullen Bunn | The Sixth Gun Volume 3: Bound | Nominee | |
| 2012 | Terry Moore | Rachel Rising Vol. 1: The Shadow of Death | Nominee | |
| 2012 | Ravi Thornton | The Tale of Brin and Bent and Minno Marylebone | Nominee | |
| 2012 | Guy Anthony De Marco and Peter J. Wacks | Behind These Eyes | Nominee | |
| 2013 | Caitlin R. Kiernan | Alabaster: Wolves | Winner | |
| 2013 | Ed Brubaker | Fatale Book Three: West of Hell | Nominee | |
| 2013 | Brandon Seifert | Witch Doctor, Vol. 2: Mal Practice | Nominee | |
| 2013 | Cameron Stewart | Sin Titulo | Nominee | |
| 2013 | Paul Tobin | Colder | Nominee | |
| 2014 | Tyler Crook and Jonathan Maberry | Bad Blood | Winner | |
| 2014 | Emily Carroll | Through the Woods | Nominee | |
| 2014 | Joe Hill and Gabriel Rodriguez | Locke & Key Vol. 6: Alpha and Omega | Nominee | |
| 2014 | Joe R. Lansdale an Daniele Serra | I Tell You It's Love | Nominee | |
| 2014 | Paul Tobin | The Witcher | Nominee | |
| 2015 | Mort Castle, Carlos Guzman, Chris Ryall, and Sam Weller | Shadow Show: Stories in Celebration of Ray Bradbury | Winner | |
| 2015 | Cullen Bunn | Harrow County, Vol. 1: Countless Haints | Nominee | |
| 2015 | Victor Gischler | Hellbound | Nominee | |
| 2015 | Robert Kirkman | Outcast Vol. 1: A Darkness Surrounds Him | Nominee | |
| 2015 | Scott Snyder | Wytches Vol. 1 | Nominee | |
| 2016 | James Chambers | Kolchak the Night Stalker: The Forgotten Lore of Edgar Allan Poe | Winner | |
| 2016 | Cullen Bunn | Blood Feud | Nominee | |
| 2016 | Alex de Campi | No Mercy, Vol. 2 | Nominee | |
| 2016 | Robert Kirkman | Outcast Vol. 3: This Little Light | Nominee | |
| 2016 | Joe R. Lansdale and Mark Alan Miller | The Steam Man | Nominee | |
| 2016 | Alan Moore | Providence, Act 1 | Nominee | |
| 2017 | Octavia E. Butler and Damian Duffy | Kindred: A Graphic Novel Adaptation | Winner | |
| 2017 | Ethan David Arvind and Mike Carey | Darkness Visible | Nominee | |
| 2017 | Emil Ferris | My Favourite Thing Is Monsters | Nominee | |
| 2017 | Jonathan Hickman | The Black Monday Murders | Nominee | |
| 2017 | Marjorie Liu | Monstress, Vol 2: The Blood | Nominee | |
| 2018 | Joana Lafuente, Victor LaValle, and Dietrich Smith | Victor LaValle's Destroyer | Winner | |
| 2018 | Saladin Ahmed, Sami Kivela & Jason Wordie | Abbott | Nominee | |
| 2018 | Brian Azzarello & Eduardo Risso | Moonshine Vol. 2 Misery Train | Nominee | |
| 2018 | Cullen Bunn | Bone Parish | Nominee | |
| 2018 | Marjorie Liu & Sana Takeda | Monstress Vol 3: Haven | Nominee | |
| 2019 | Colleen Doran & Neil Gaiman | Neil Gaiman's Snow, Glass, Apples | Winner | |
| 2019 | Cullen Bunn | Bone Parish Vol.2 | Nominee | |
| 2019 | Marjorie Liu | Monstress Vol.4: The Chosen | Nominee | |
| 2019 | Alessandro Mansetti | Calcutta Horror | Nominee | |
| 2019 | Gou Tanabe | H.P. Lovecraft's At the Mountains of Madness Volume I | Nominee | |
| 2020 | Chiara Di Francia (artist), Nancy Holder (author), and Amelia Woo (artist) | Mary Shelley Presents | Winner | |
| 2020 | Steven Archer (author; artist) | The Masque of the Red Death | Nominee | |
| 2020 | Jennifer Brody (author) & Jules Rivera (artist) | Spectre Deep 6 | Nominee | |
| 2020 | Stefano Cardoselli (author; artist) & Alessandro Manzetti (author) | Her Life Matters: (Or Brooklyn Frankenstein) | Nominee | |
| 2020 | Alex Cormack (artist) & Rich Douek (author) | Road of Bones | Nominee | |
| 2020 | Szymon Kudranski (artist), Steve Niles (author), and Salvatore Simeone (author) | Lonesome Days, Savage Nights | Nominee | |
| 2021 | Stefano Cardoselli (author; artist) & Alessandro Manzetti (author) | The Inhabitant of the Lake | Winner | |
| 2021 | Saladin Ahmed (author) & Sami Kivela (artist) | Abbott 1973 | Nominee | |
| 2021 | Jason Badower (artist), Kami Garcia (author), Mike Mayher (artist), and Mico Suayan (artist) | Joker/Harley: Criminal Insanity | Nominee | |
| 2021 | Alex Child (author), Naomi Franquiz (artist), and Grant Morrison (author) | Proctor Valley Road | Nominee | |
| 2021 | Marianna Ignazzi (artist) & Dan Panosian (author) | An Unkindness of Ravens | Nominee | |
| 2022 | James Aquilone (editor) | Kolchak: The Night Stalker: 50th Anniversary | Winner | |
| 2022 | Sarah Gailey (author) and Pius Bak (artist) | Eat the Rich | Nominee | |
| 2022 | Alessandro Manzetti (author) and Stefano Cardoselli (artist/author) | Kraken Inferno: The Last Hunt | Nominee | |
| 2022 | James Tynion IV (author) and Werther Dell’Edera (artist) | Something Is Killing the Children, Vol. 4 | Nominee | |
| 2022 | Skottie Young (author) and Jorge Corona (artist) | The Me You Love in the Dark | Nominee | |
| 2023 | Amy Chu (author) and Soo Lee (artist) | Carmilla: The First Vampire | Winner | |
| 2023 | Cullen Bunn (author) and Leomacs (artist) | Ghostlore, Vol. 1 | Nominee | |
| 2023 | Adam Cesare (author) and David Stoll (artist) | Dead Mall | Nominee | |
| 2023 | Junji Ito | Tombs | Nominee | |
| 2023 | Gou Tanabe | H. P. Lovecraft's The Shadow Over Innsmouth | Nominee | |
| 2024 | Gou Tanabe | H. P. Lovecraft’s The Call of Cthulhu | Winner | |
| 2024 | Robin Ha | The Fox Maidens | Nominee | |
| 2024 | Beth Hetland | Tender | Nominee | |
| 2024 | Patrick Horvath | Beneath the Trees Where Nobody Sees | Nominee | |
| 2024 | Maggie Umber | Chrysanthemum Under The Waves | Nominee | |
| 2025 | Mike Mignola | Bowling With Corpses and Other Tales from Lands Unknown | Winner | |
| 2025 | Cullen Bunn | Jumpscare | Nominee | |
| 2025 | Sandy King | John Carpenter’s Tales for a HalloweeNight, Volume 11 | Nominee | |
| 2025 | Daniel Kraus | Athanasia | Nominee | |
| 2025 | James Tynion IV, Steve Foxe | Let This One Be a Devil | Nominee | |
