= Anya's Ghost =

2011 graphic novel by Vera Brosgol

- Anya's Ghost cover
- Author: Vera Brosgol
- Language: English
- Genre: Coming-of-age; ghost story
- Set in: New England
- Published: June 7, 2011
- Publisher: First Second Books
- Media type: Graphic novel
- Pages: 221 or 224
- Awards: Cybils Award (2011); Eisner Award (2012); Harvey Award (2012)
- ISBN: 978-1-59643-552-0
- Dewey Decimal: 741.5973

Anya's Ghost is a coming-of-age ghost story in graphic novel format. The first book by cartoonist Vera Brosgol, Anya's Ghost was published on June 7, 2011.

In the novel, unpopular Anya befriends the ghost of Emily, a girl around Anya's age who died 90 years earlier. After failing to make Anya popular and happy, Emily becomes manipulative and controlling, leading Anya to discover the truth about Emily's death.

Anya's Ghost took four years from inception to publication, and is drawn predominantly in hues of violet. Well received by critics, Anya's Ghost is the recipient of Cyblis, Harvey, and Eisner awards. Production on a film adaptation of the novel was supposed to begin by the end of 2017.

== Plot ==
Annushka Borzakovskaya (Anya) is a Russian émigré living in the United States with her mother and 6-year-old brother (Sasha). Unpopular at her New England private school, Anya skips school and walks through a nearby forest. She falls into a dry well and finds herself alongside a human skeleton. The skeleton's ghost - a shy, homely girl named Emily - appears and explains that she too fell down the well and died of dehydration after breaking her neck ninety years ago. Emily wishes to befriend and help Anya, but cannot move far from her bones. Anya is soon rescued by a passerby, but Emily's skeleton remains undiscovered.

Emily later appears to Anya at school, telling Anya she had inadvertently taken a finger bone from Emily's skeleton. Anya decides to keep the bone after Emily helps her cheat on a biology exam and spy on her crush, Sean. Emily gives her full name as Emily Reilly and explains that her fiancé died fighting in World War I, and that her parents were murdered at home. She was running from the killer when she fell down the well. Anya promises to find Emily's killer, while Emily agrees to help Anya fit in at school and win over Sean. As their friendship develops, Anya drifts away from her one friend at school, Siobhan, while Emily becomes disinterested in discovering her alleged murderer's identity.

At Emily's insistence, Anya dresses up and goes to a party attended by Sean and his girlfriend Elizabeth. There, Anya discovers that Sean habitually cheats on Elizabeth with her knowledge. Distraught, Anya leaves the party, which makes Emily angry and confused as she believed Anya and Sean were destined for each other. Anya later notices Emily becoming more controlling and adjusting her appearance by straightening her hair and smoking ghostly cigarettes. Anya goes to the library without Emily to research the killer; there, with the help of the class’ nerd Dima, she learns that Emily had no fiancé, but had instead murdered a young couple in their home after her unrequited love rejected her, and then died running from the authorities.

When Anya returns home, the finger bone is missing. After being confronted with the truth, Emily shows that she is capable of moving solid objects, implying that she put her finger bone in Anya's bag. Emily begins threatening Anya's family to make Anya comply, even causing Anya's mother to fall down the stairs. After Emily appears before Sasha and haunts him, he reveals that he found the bone earlier, thinking it was a dinosaur bone from his collection. Anya retrieves it and runs to the well, pursued by Emily.

Once there, Anya confronts and accuses Emily of trying to live vicariously through her. Emily rebukes Anya, saying that she is no better, and that the two of them are more alike than she wants to admit. After Emily fails to push Anya into the well, Anya drops the bone back in. Emily then possesses her own skeleton and climbs out to give further chase. Anya stops and convinces Emily of the futility of her situation, causing the tearful ghost to dissipate, and the skeleton to fall back into the well. The next day, Anya convinces her school to fill the well and rekindles her friendship with Siobhan.

== Development ==
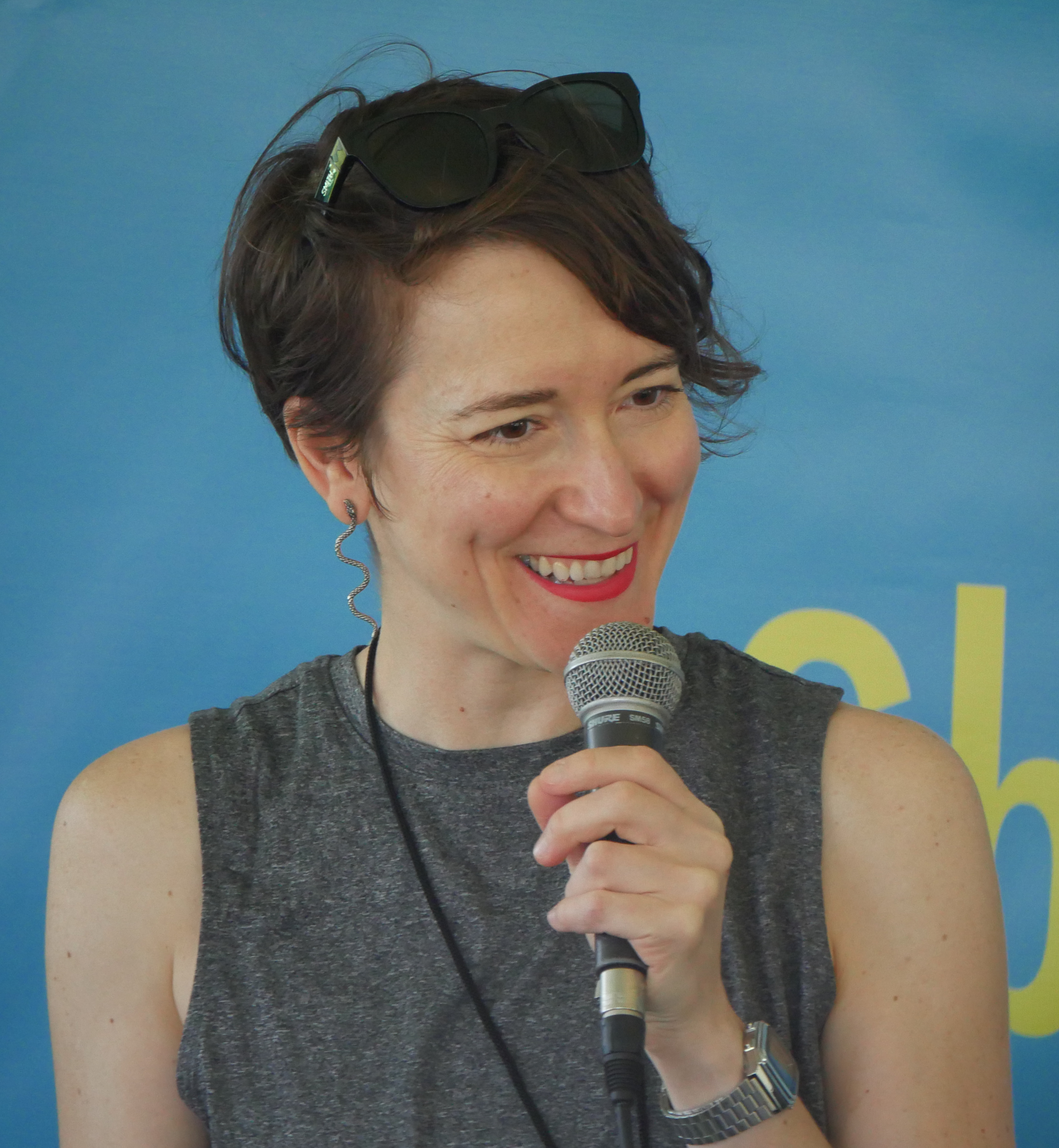
Brosgol in May 2025

=== Writing ===
Brosgol conceived the character of Anya when she was working on Put the Book Back on the Shelf (2006), a comics anthology based on the music of the Scottish indie pop band Belle and Sebastian. She wrote a short story about a disaffected schoolgirl to accompany the song "Family Tree" (from the band's 2000 album Fold Your Hands Child, You Walk Like a Peasant). Brosgol didn't finish the story, but enjoyed drawing "that character with her fat little legs and cigarettes." Then, after reading Haruki Murakami's novel The Wind-Up Bird Chronicle, she decided her unnamed character should fall down a well. The rest of the story came later, drawn from the author's own life and other inspiration. Brosgol started work on Anya's Ghost in 2007.

=== Production ===
As Anya's Ghost was her first book, Brosgol said that its production was an exercise in trial and error. Brosgol does not work from a script, saying that "the art and the dialogue come at the same time and one suggests the other". She prefers to illustrate events rather than use dialogue in her comics. Working from a detailed outline, Brosgol drew thumbnails of each panel—two to a page in a Moleskine notebook—and wrote the dialogue as she went along.

From her thumbnails, Brosgol used her Wacom Cintiq to draw a rough version of the ultimate art. This rough version of Anya's Ghost went to her editor for approval. After approval, Brosgol went back through her rough draft and "tightened the roughs up just enough so that [she] could ink them". She then used paintbrushes (being especially particular about her Winsor & Newton Series 7s) to paint on Canson translucent vellum atop her printed-out rough draft. Brosgol inked the panels and speech balloons first, adding in the lettering digitally later with a custom font developed for her by John Martz; she colored the novel in Adobe Photoshop.

Anya's Ghost is drawn in what Pamela Paul called a "deep violet palette" that Brosgol called "purpley-blue". The artist herself said she chose the colors "for no other reason than I like purpley-blue and I think it feels right for the story". Susan Carpenter of the Los Angeles Times interpreted the colors as "a subtle underscoring of Anya's bruised ego".

=== Publication ===
Having worked on Kazu Kibuishi's Flight comics, Brosgol contacted his talent agent Judith Hansen who had agreed to look at the work of anybody involved. After completing the art for Anya's Ghost in 2009, Brosgol brought it to Hansen, who agreed to represent the artist. Brosgol finished the cover art in 2010, and then "there's a full year on the end for printing, and marketing, and all of that which comes with a book publisher." The book was published on June 7, 2011 by First Second Books.

== Reception ==
Anya's Ghost won the 2011 Cybils literary award in the Young Adult category. It also won the 2012 Harvey Award for "Best Original Graphic Publication for Younger Readers" and the 2012 Eisner Award for "Best Publication for Young Adults (Ages 12–17)". Anya's Ghost was nominated for the 2011 Bram Stoker Award for Best Graphic Novel, but lost to Neonomicon by Alan Moore.

The Los Angeles Times' Susan Carpenter reviewed the graphic novel and described it as "a well-paced story that feels dynamic and also intimate." She further lauded the work, calling it "humorous" and "beautifully drawn". Pamela Paul of The New York Times compared Anya's Ghost positively to Marjane Satrapi's Persepolis, saying that the novel felt real (even with its supernatural elements) and that Anya was "a smart, funny and compassionate portrait of someone who, for all her sulking and sneering, is the kind of daughter many parents would like to have." Wired's Kathy Ceceri also noted an artistic similarity to Persepolis; she not only liked how Anya's Ghost intertwined the teenage angst and fantasy elements of the novel, but praised how Anya's desire for a boyfriend doesn't overwhelm the story. Cory Doctorow reviewed Anya's Ghost for Boing Boing, calling it "really sweet, really funny and really scary, [with] a powerful message about identity, fitting in, and the secret selfish bastard lurking in all of us and whether having such a goblin inside makes us irredeemable or merely human." Whitney Matheson with USA Today wrote that Anya's Ghost is a "funny, creepy and a delightful page-turner" and cited author Neil Gaiman who called the novel "a masterpiece". Steve Duin of The Oregonian praised the inventiveness of Brosgol's storytelling, and called her art "[a] little uneven, but ... at its best when the lights go out." Almost six years after its publication, Paste listed Anya's Ghost as a comic having "the potential to mean something special, to offer something valuable and important, whether that’s revelatory depth or escapist fun, to a young reader."

== Film adaptation ==
Andy and Barbara Muschietti, director and producer of the 2013 horror film Mama, bought the film rights to Anya's Ghost in 2015. That October, they were speaking with scriptwriter Patrick Ness for a screenplay, and in August 2017, Deadline Hollywood announced that, with a script by Ness, production of the Anya's Ghost film would "begin before year’s end." Dan Mazer would direct, Jeremy Bolt and Benedict Carver would produce, and Entertainment One was financing the film. Bolt described Ness as "passionate about the source material", having written a "fresh and distinctive" screenplay; Bolt went on to describe the film as a "classic high school comedy with a supernatural twist." According to Deadline Hollywood, Emma Roberts had been cast to star in the film.

== See also ==
- Portrayal of women in American comics
