= James Chambers (writer) =

American novelist (born 1970)

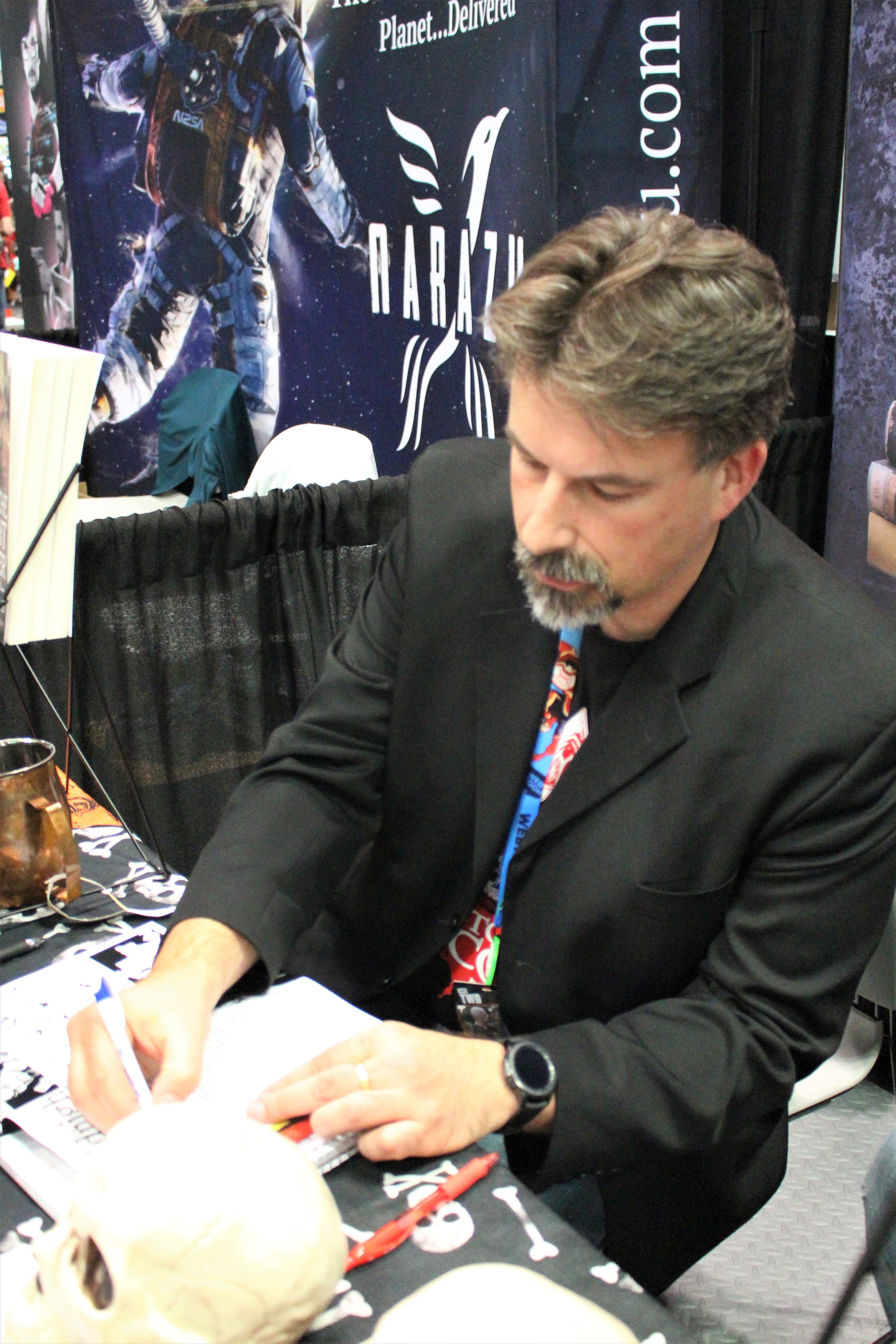
- Chambers signing books, circa 2019
- Born: December 16, 1970 (age 55); New York, U.S.
- Education: Fordham University
- Occupation: Author
- Awards: HWA Silver Hammer Award (2016), The HWA President's Richard Laymon Award (2012), Bram Stoker Award (2012)
- Website: jameschambersonline.com

James Chambers (born December 16, 1970) is an American author, comic book writer, and a member of the Horror Writers Association.

== Biography ==
Chambers is a member of and volunteer for the Horror Writers Association and recipient of the 2012 HWA President's Richard Laymon Award and the 2016 HWA Silver Hammer Award. In 2018, he chaired StokerCon, the Horror Writers Association annual conference, and taught writing workshops at the HWA Horror University.

He was awarded the Bram Stoker Award for Best Graphic Novel in 2016 for Kolchak: the Night Stalker: The Forgotten Lore of Edgar Allan Poe and has been a finalist for the Bram Stoker Award three times. In 1995 and 1996, he collaborated with Leonard Nimoy as editor on the comic book series Leonard Nimoy's Primortals and Origins and with Majel Barrett Roddenberry while editing Gene Roddenberry's Lost Universe. He also edited Isaac Asimov's I*BOTS, a posthumous comic book series based on concepts by Isaac Asimov. He lives in New York, is a member of the Horror Writers Association New York Chapter, and coordinates the Night Terror series of horror readings in New York City.

== Published works ==
=== Anthology ===
- A New York State of Fright: Horror Stories from the Empire State eds. James Chambers, April Grey, and Robert Masterson, New York: Hippocampus Press, 2018 (ISBN 978-1614982272). This fund-raising anthology benefitted Girls Write Now.

=== Collections ===
- On the Night Border, Bowie, MD: Raw Dog Screaming Press, 2019. (ISBN 978-1947879119 PB; ISBN 978-1947879157 HC)
- "The Engines of Sacrifice" – The Engines of Sacrifice. Colusa, CA: Dark Regions Press, 2011. (ISBN 978-1937128081); a collection of four Lovecraft-inspired novellas published by Dark Regions Press which Publishers Weekly described as "…chillingly evocative…" in a starred review.
- Resurrection House, Colusa, Calif.: Dark Regions Press, 2009. (ISBN 978-1888993691)
- The Midnight Hour: Saint Lawn Hill and Other Tales, Baltimore, MD: Die, Monster, Die! Books, 2005. (ISBN 09759904-2-X)

=== Comics and graphic novels ===
- "The Origin of the Primortals, Part I" – Leonard Nimoy's Primortals: ORIGINS Vol. 1, No. 1 (1995). Boca Raton, FL: Tekno Comix/Big Entertainment.
- "The Origin of the Primortals, Part II" – Leonard Nimoy's Primortals: ORIGINS Vol. 1, No. 2 (1995). Boca Raton, FL: TeknoComix/Big Entertainment.
- "Cross Country: Part I" – Leonard Nimoy's Primortals Vol. 1, No. 13 (1995). Boca Raton, FL: TeknoComix/Big Entertainment.
- "Cross Country: Part II" – Leonard Nimoy's Primortals Vol. 1, No. 14 (1995). Boca Raton, FL: TeknoComix/Big Entertainment.
- "Cross Country: Part III" – Leonard Nimoy's Primortals Vol. 1, No. 15 (1995). Boca Raton, FL: TeknoComix/Big Entertainment.
- "Cross Country: World in Flames" – Leonard Nimoy's Primortals Vol. 2, No. 0 (1996). Boca Raton, FL: TeknoComix/Big Entertainment.
- "Homecoming" – Leonard Nimoy's Primortals Vol. 2, No. 7 (1996). Boca Raton, FL: TeknoComix/Big Entertainment.
- "Lost Girl" – Shadow House Vol. 1, No. 1 (August 1997). New York: Shadow House Press.
- "Black Coffin Death" – Shadow House Vol. 1, No. 2 (October 1997). New York: Shadow House Press.
- "Swamp Thunder" – Shadow House Vol. 1, No. 3 (December 1997). New York: Shadow House Press.
- "The Mourning After" – Shadow House Vol. 1, No. 4 (February 1998). New York: Shadow House Press.
- "One Man's Nightmare, Another Man's Soul" – Shadow House Vol. 1, No. 5 (April 1997). New York: Shadow House Press.
- "The Hand of Gorlak" – The Midnight Hour Vol. 1, No. 1 (August 2004). Baltimore, MD: Die Monster Die Books.
- "The Demon Head of Harbuu Kisasi" – Negative Burn Vol. 2, No. 9 (January 2007). Image Comics/Desperado Publishing.
- Kolchak the Night Stalker: The Forgotten Lore of Edgar Allan Poe, Moonstone Books, 2016. - This Bram Stoker Award-winning graphic novel featured Carl Kolchak of the television series in all-new stories inspired by the life and works of Edgar Allan Poe.

=== Novellas ===
- The Dead Bear Witness – Pennsville, NJ: eSpec Books, 2019, paperback (ISBN 978-1942990994); MD: Cemetery Dance, 2019, e-book; Dark Quest Books, Howell, NJ, 2012. (ISBN 978-1937051204); published in an earlier version as a chapbook, Baltimore, MD: Die, Monster, Die! Books, 2002 / Reprinted, The Dead Walk. Vincent Sneed, ed. Baltimore, MD: Die, Monster, Die! Books, 2004. (ISBN 0-9759904-1-1)
- Tears of Blood – Pennsville, NJ: eSpec Books, 2020, (ISBN 978-1949691061); Dark Quest Books, Howell, NJ, 2012. (ISBN 978-1937051273); published in an earlier version as "Crying Tears of Blood, Sweet Like Honey" in Bare Bone # 9. Kevin L. Donihe, ed. Raw Dog Screaming Press, November 2006.
- "The Dead, In Their Masses" – The Dead Walk Again. Vince Sneed, ed. Farmingdale, NY: Padwolf Publishing, 2007. (ISBN 978-1890096373)
- "Investigation 37" – The Engines of Sacrifice. Colusa, CA: Dark Regions Press, 2011. (ISBN 978-1937128081)
- "The Hidden Room" – The Engines of Sacrifice. Colusa, CA: Dark Regions Press, 2011. (ISBN 978-1937128081)
- "The Ugly Birds" – The Engines of Sacrifice. Colusa, CA: Dark Regions Press, 2011. (ISBN 978-1937128081)
- Three Chords of Chaos – Pennsville, NJ: eSpec Books, 2019, (ISBN 978-1949691016); Dark Quest Books, Howell, NJ, 2013. (ISBN 978-1937051396)

=== Short fiction ===
- "The Ghost of the Bayou Pitenn" – Chiral Mad 4. Michael Bailey and Lucy A. Snyder, eds. Written Backwards, Calif., 2018. (ISBN 978-0999575499)
- "A Manifest Destiny, or the Testament of a Continental Regular" – War Fear. Bruce Gehweiller, ed. Marietta, GA: Marietta Publishing, 2002. Paperback edition, 2008. (ISBN 978-1892669117/978-1892669209)
- "A Wandering Blackness" – Lin Carter's Dr. Anton Zarnak, Occult Detective. Robert Price, ed. Marietta, GA: Marietta Publishing, 2002. (ISBN 978-1892669094) – received an honorable mention in The Year's Best Fantasy and Horror, Sixteenth Annual Collection
- "Keeper of Beasts" – Lin Carter's Dr. Anton Zarnak, Occult Detective. Robert Price, ed. Marietta, GA: Marietta Publishing, 2002. (ISBN 978-1892669094)
- Mooncat Jack – Chapbook, Baltimore, MD: Die, Monster, Die! Books, 2002. / Reprinted, Resurrection House, Colusa, Calif.: Dark Regions Press, 2009. (ISBN 978-1888993691)
- "The Last Stand of Black Danny O'Barry" – Weird Trails. Michael Szymanski, ed. Lockport, NY: Triad Entertainment, 2002. (ISBN 978-0971908109) / Reprinted, Resurrection House, Colusa, Calif.: Dark Regions Press, 2009. (ISBN 978-1888993691)
- "The Tale of the Spanish Prisoner" – WarFear. Bruce Gehweiller, ed. Marietta, GA: Marietta Publishing, 2002. Paperback edition, 2008. / Reprinted, Resurrection House, Colusa, Calif.: Dark Regions Press, 2009. (ISBN 978-1888993691)
- "Trick" – Mooncat Jack, Chapbook, Baltimore, MD: Die, Monster, Die! Books, 2002. / Reprinted, No Longer Dreams. Danielle Ackley-McPhail, Lee Hillmann, L. Jagi Lamplighter, and Jeff Lyman, eds. Baltimore, MD: Lite Circle Books, 2005 / Reprinted, Resurrection House, Colusa, Calif.: Dark Regions Press, 2009. (ISBN 978-1888993691)
- "Against the Stars Themselves" – The Black Book, January 2003.
- "The Kind Old Fellow" – Sick: An Anthology of Illness. John Edward Lawson, ed. Baltimore, MD: Raw Dog Screaming Press, 2003. (ISBN 978-0974503110)
- "Refugees" – Allen K's Inhuman. Allen Koszowski, ed. Baltimore, MD: Die, Monster, Die! Books, 2004. (w/ Vince Sneed). / Reprinted, Resurrection House, Colusa, Calif.: Dark Regions Press, 2009. (ISBN 978-1888993691)
- "Resurrection House" – The Dead Walk. Vincent Sneed, ed. Baltimore, MD: Die, Monster, Die! Books, 2004. (ISBN 0-9759904-1-1)/ Reprinted, Resurrection House, Colusa, Calif.: Dark Regions Press, 2009. (ISBN 978-1888993691)
- "Blood & Water, Fang & Sting" – The Midnight Hour: Saint Lawn Hill and Other Tales. Baltimore, MD: Die, Monster, Die! Books, 2005. (ISBN 09759904-2-X) – created in collaboration with artist Jason Whitley
- "Children of the Oneiroi" – The Midnight Hour: Saint Lawn Hill and Other Tales. Baltimore, MD: Die, Monster, Die! Books, 2005. (ISBN 09759904-2-X)
- "Danse" (as Jan Rukh) – Dark Furies. Vincent Sneed, ed. Baltimore, MD: Die, Monster, Die! Books, 2005. (ISBN 0-9759904-0-3)
- "Gray Gulls Gyre" – Dark Furies. Vincent Sneed, ed. Baltimore, MD: Die, Monster, Die! Books, 2005. (ISBN 0-9759904-0-3) / Reprinted, Resurrection House, Colusa, Calif.: Dark Regions Press, 2009. (ISBN 978-1888993691)
- "The Hand of Fate" – Chapbook, Baltimore, MD: Die, Monster, Die! Books, 2005 / Reprinted, The Midnight Hour: Saint Lawn Hill and Other Tales. Baltimore, MD: Die, Monster, Die! Books, 2005. (ISBN 09759904-2-X) / Reprinted, R. Allen Leider's The Hellfire Lounge 2, Marietta, GA: Marietta Publishing, 2011. (ISBN 978-1892669742)
- "Hot-Baked Hell" – The Midnight Hour: Saint Lawn Hill and Other Tales. Baltimore, MD: Die, Monster, Die! Books, 2005. (ISBN 09759904-2-X)
- "Law of the Kuzzi" – No Longer Dreams. Danielle Ackley-McPhail, Lee Hillmann, L. Jagi Lamplighter, and Jeff Lyman, eds. Baltimore, MD: Lite Circle Books, 2005. / Reprinted on SpaceWesterns.com, September 2007. / Reprinted in Cowboys in Space. Mike McPhail, ed., Louisville, CO: Copper Dog Publishing, 2016 (978-1943690091)
- "Picture Man" – Bare Bone # 7. Kevin L. Donihe, ed. Raw Dog Screaming Press, May 2005.
- "Saint Lawn Hill" – The Midnight Hour: Saint Lawn Hill and Other Tales. Baltimore, MD: Die, Monster, Die! Books, 2005. (ISBN 09759904-2-X)
- "The Blackburn Cairns" – The Midnight Hour: Saint Lawn Hill and Other Tales. Baltimore, MD: Die, Monster, Die! Books, 2005. (ISBN 09759904-2-X)
- "The Blood of Demons" – The Midnight Hour: Saint Lawn Hill and Other Tales. Baltimore, MD: Die, Monster, Die! Books, 2005. (ISBN 09759904-2-X)
- "Unhallowed Ground, Unholy Flesh" – Lost Worlds of Space and Time (Volume 1), Steven Lines, Ed., Calne, Wiltshire, UK: Rainfall Books, 2005.
- "Upon A Slender Stem" – Hear Them Roar. CJ Henderson and Patrick Thomas, eds. Spyre, 2006 (Reissued: Marietta, GA: Marietta Publishing, 2008); originally published in The Midnight Hour: Saint Lawn Hill and Other Tales. Baltimore, MD: Die, Monster, Die! Books, 2005. (ISBN 09759904-2-X)
- "Young Demons" – At The Midnight Hour (.com), 2005.
- "Mosqueto" – Crypt-Critters (Volume 1). Bruce Gehweiller, ed. Farmingdale, NY: Padwolf Publishing, 2006. (ISBN 978-1890096335)
- "The Feeding Things" – Cthulhu Sex # 23. Cthulhu Sex, February 2006. / Reprinted, Resurrection House, Colusa, Calif.: Dark Regions Press, 2009. (ISBN 978-1888993691)
- "The Roaches in the Walls" – Hardboiled Cthulhu. James Ambeuhl, ed. Lake Orion, MI: Elder Signs Press, 2006. (ISBN 978-0975922972)
- "An Account of Two Deaths" – Crypt-Critters (Volume 2). Bruce Gehweiller, ed. Farmingdale, NY: Padwolf Publishing, 2007. (ISBN 978-1890096380)
- "Killer Eye" – Breach the Hull. (Defending the Future, Volume 1) Mike McPhail, ed. Marietta, GA: Marietta Publishing, 2007. (ISBN 978-0979690198)
- "Sally Smiles" – Bad-Ass Faeries. Danielle Ackley-McPhail, Lee Hillmann, L. Jagi Lamplighter, and Jeff Lyman, eds. Marietta, GA: Marietta Publishing, 2007 / Reissued, Cincinnati, OH: Mundania Press, 2009. (ISBN 978-1606592045)
- "Swamp Hoppers" – Crypto-Critters (Volume 2). Bruce Gehweiller, ed. Farmingdale, NY: Padwolf Publishing, 2007. (ISBN 978-1890096380) / Reprinted, Resurrection House, Colusa, Calif.: Dark Regions Press, 2009 (Deluxe Edition hardcover only). (ISBN 978-1888993691)
- "The Way of the Bone" – Bad-Ass Faeries 2: Just Plain Bad. Danielle Ackley-McPhail, Lee Hillmann, L. Jagi Lamplighter, and Jeff Lyman, eds. Marietta, GA: Marietta Publishing, 2008 / Reissued, Cincinnati, OH: Mundania Press, 2009. (ISBN 978-1606592069)
- "Corporeal Gains" – R. Allen Leider's Hellfire Lounge, Marietta, GA: Marietta Publishing, 2009. (ISBN 978-1892669612)
- "Derelict" – Resurrection House, Colusa, Calif.: Dark Regions Press, 2009 (Deluxe Edition hardcover only). (ISBN 978-1888993691)
- "Five Points" – Resurrection House, Colusa, Calif.: Dark Regions Press, 2009. (ISBN 978-1888993691)
- "The Devil, You Know" – Domino Lady: Sex as a Weapon. Lori Gentile, ed. Moonstone Books, 2009. (ISBN 978-1933076393)
- "Vicious Swimmers" – Resurrection House, Colusa, Calif.: Dark Regions Press, 2009. (ISBN 978-1888993691)
- "War Movies" – So It Begins. (Defending the Future, Volume 2) Mike McPhail, ed. Howell, NJ: Dark Quest Books, 2009. (ISBN 978-0979690150)
- "Box Lunch" – New Blood. Diane Raetz and Patrick Thomas, eds. New York: Padwolf Publishing, 2010. (ISBN 978-1890096441)
- "Faerie Ring Blues" – Bad-Ass Faeries 3: In All Their Glory. Danielle Ackley-McPhail, Lee Hillmann, L. Jagi Lamplighter, and Jeff Lyman, eds. Cincinnati, OH: Mundania Press, 2010. (ISBN 978-1606592083)
- "Grilg Friendly" – Barbarians at the Jumpgate. Bruce Gehweiller, ed. New York: Padwolf Publishing, 2010. (ISBN 978-1890096434)
- "Henkin's Last Lies" – Bad Cop, No Donut. John L. French, ed. New York: Padwolf Publishing, 2010. (ISBN 978-1890096458)
- "He Who Burns" – Dragon's Lure. Danielle Ackley-McPhail, Jennifer Ross, and Jeffrey Lyman, eds. Howell, NJ: Dark Quest Books, 2010. (ISBN 978-0982619797)
- "Topsy Turvy" – The Green Hornet Chronicles. Joe Gentile and Win Scott Eckert, eds. Calumet City, IL: Moonstone Entertainment, Inc., 2010. (ISBN 978-1933076737)
- "House of Automatons" – In an Iron Cage. Danielle Ackley-McPhail, Elektra Hammond, and Neal Levin, eds. Howell, NJ: Dark Quest Books, 2011. (ISBN 978-0983099307)
- "Mother of Peace" – By Other Means (Defending the Future, Volume 3) Mike McPhail, ed. Howell, NJ: Dark Quest Books, 2011. (ISBN 978-0983099352)
- "Birch's Refugees" – The Dead Bear Witness (Corpse Fauna, volume 1), Dark Quest Books, Howell, NJ, 2012. (ISBN 978-1937051204)
- "Dead-End Street" – Tears of Blood (Corpse Fauna, volume 2), Dark Quest Books, Howell, NJ, 2012. (ISBN 978-1937051273)
- "I Am the Last" – Fantastic Futures 13. Robert E. Waters and James R. Stratton, ed. Farmingdale, NY: Padwolf Publishing, 2012. (ISBN 978-1890096649)
- "Meet the Tuskersons" – Walrus Tales. Kevin L. Donihe, ed. Eraserhead Press, Portland, OR, 2012. (ISBN 978-1936383542)
- "A Snowball's Chance in Purgatory" – To Hell in a Fast Car. John L. French, ed. Howell, NJ: Dark Quest Books, 2012. (ISBN 978-1937051655)
- "Trade War" – Best Laid Plans (Defending the Future, Volume 5) Mike McPhail, ed. Howell, NJ: Dark Quest Books, 2012. (ISBN 978-1937051044)
- "Upon Wave, Wind, and Tide" – Mermaids 13. John L. French, ed. Farmingdale, NY: Padwolf Publishing, 2012. (ISBN 978-1890096519)
- "A Cat's Cry in Pluto's Kitchen" – Clockwork Chaos. Neal Levin and Danielle Ackley-McPhail, eds. Howell, NJ: Dark Quest Books, 2013. (ISBN 978-1937051563)
- "Father of War" – Dogs of War (Defending the Future, Volume 6), Mike McPhail, ed. Howell, NJ: Dark Quest Books, 2013. (ISBN 978-1937051051)
- "Lost Daughters" – Deep Cuts: Mayhem, Menace, Misery. Angel Leigh McCoy, E.S. Magill, and Chris Marrs, eds. Evil Jester Press, New York, 2013. (ISBN 978-0615750897)
- "Mnemonicide" – Chiral Mad 2. Michael Bailey, ed. Written Backwards, Calif., 2013. (ISBN 978-1494239978)
- "The Blood Eaters" – The Avenger: Roaring Heart of the Crucible. Nancy Holder and Joe Gentile, eds. Calumet City, IL: Moonstone Entertainment, Inc., 2013. (ISBN 978-1-936814-41-1)
- "The Steel Tsars" – The Spider: Extreme Prejudice. Joe Gentile and Tommy Hancock, eds. Calumet City, IL: Moonstone Entertainment, Inc., 2013. (ISBN 978-1-936814-47-3/978-1-936814-46-6)
- "Marco Polo" – Truth or Dare? Max Booth III, ed. Cibolo, TX: Perpetual Motion Machine Publishing, 2014. (ISBN 978-0986059452)
- "The Price of Faces" – Qualia Nous. Michael Bailey, ed. Written Backwards, Calif., 2014. (ISBN 978-0578146461)
- "Super-Villain Showcase #53: Enter the Deep Loa" – With Great Power. John L. French and Greg Schauer, eds. Howell, NJ: Dark Quest Books, 2014. (ISBN 978-1937051891)
- "Tell It to the Judge" – TV Gods. Jeff Young and Lee C. Hillman, eds. Fortress Publishing, Inc., 2014. (ISBN 978-0988799127)
- "The Flying Rock" – Bad-Ass Faeries 4: It's Elemental. Danielle Ackley-McPhail, Lee Hillmann, L. Jagi Lamplighter, and Jeff Lyman, eds. Howell, NJ: Dark Quest Books, 2014. (ISBN 978-1937051983)
- "Eight Million Strong" – The Side of Good. Danielle Ackley-McPhail and Greg Schauer, eds. Pennsville, NJ: eSpec Books, 2015. (ISBN 978-1942990031)
- "Every Second of Every Day" – The Society for the Preservation of CJ Henderson. Danielle Ackley-McPhail and Greg Schauer, eds. Stratford, NJ: eSpec Books, 2015. (ISBN 978-1942990000)
- "Odd Quahogs" – Shadows Over Main Street. Doug Murano and D. Alexander Ward, eds. Hazardous Press, 2015. (ISBN 978-0692329733)
- "The Last Great Monologue of Evil Intent" – The Side of Evil. Danielle Ackley-McPhail and Greg Schauer, eds. Pennsville, NJ: eSpec Books, 2015. (ISBN 978-1942990031)
- "The Monster with My Fist for Its Head" – Reel Dark. L. Andrew Cooper and Pamela Turner, eds. BlackWyrm Publishing, 2015. (ISBN 978-1613181744)
- "In Wolf's Clothing" – Gaslight & Grimm: Steampunk Faerie Tales. Danielle Ackley-McPhail and Diana Bastine, eds. Stratford, NJ: eSpec Books, 2016. (ISBN 978-1942990314)
- "The Lost Boy" – Kolchak the Night Stalker: Passages of the Macabre. Dave Ulanski and Tracey Hill, eds. Lockport, IL: Moonstone Books, 2016. (ISBN 978-1936814961)
- "The Many Hands Inside the Mountain" – Dark Hallows II: Tales from the Witching Hour. Mark Parker, ed. Scarlet Galleon Publications, 2016. (ISBN 978-1537639246)
- "A Night at Odd Angels'" – Kolchak the Night Stalker: The Forgotten Lore of Edgar Allan Poe, Moonstone Books, 2016.
- "The Meth Moths of Kraken Mare" – Man and Machine (Defending the Future, Volume 7). Mike McPhail, ed. Stratford, NJ: eSpec Books, 2017. (ISBN 978-1942990093)
- "A Song Left Behind in the Aztakea Hills" – Shadows Over Main Street, Volume 2. Doug Murano and D. Alexander Ward, eds. Winchester, VA: Cutting Block Books, 2017. (ISBN 978-0996115995)
- "The Star Gazers" – If We Had Known (Beyond The Cradle). Mike McPhail, ed. Stratford, NJ: eSpec Books, 2017. (ISBN 978-1942990291)
- "A Feast for Dead Horses" – After Punk: Steampowered Tales of the After Life. Danielle Ackley-McPhail and Greg Schauer, eds. Pennsville, NJ: eSpec Books, 2018. (ISBN 978-1942990802)
- "A Beach on Nellus" – In Harm's Way, (Defending the Future, Volume 8) Pennsville, NJ: eSpec Books, 2019. (ISBN 978-1-942990-19-2)
- "Echoes from the Ice" – Mountains of Madness Revealed. Darrell Schweitzer, ed. UK: PS Publishing, 2019. (ISBN 978-1786363749)
- "The Black Box" – Footprints in the Stars. Pennsville, NJ: eSpec Books, 2019. (ISBN 978-1-949691-03-0)
- "The Chamber of Last Earthly Delights" – On the Night Border. Bowie, MD: Raw Dog Screaming Press, 2019. (ISBN 978-1947879119 PB; ISBN 978-1947879157 HC)
- "The Driver Under a Cheshire Moon" – On the Night Border. Bowie, MD: Raw Dog Screaming Press, 2019. (ISBN 978-1947879119 PB; ISBN 978-1947879157 HC)
- "Feed the Fair Folk Sweet" – Three Chords of Chaos, Pennsville, NJ: eSpec Books, 2019, (ISBN 978-1949691016)
- "Living/Dead" – On the Night Border. Bowie. MD: Raw Dog Screaming Press, 2019. (ISBN 978-1947879119 PB; ISBN 978-1947879157 HC)
- "Red Mami" – On the Night Border. Bowie, MD: Raw Dog Screaming Press, 2019. (ISBN 978-1947879119 PB; ISBN 978-1947879157 HC)
- "Right of Crossing" – The Pulp Horror Book of Phobias. MJ Sydney, ed. Tacoma, Wash.: Lycan Valley Press, 2019. (ISBN 978-1-64562-950-4)
- "Sum'bitch and the Arakadile" – On the Night Border. Bowie, MD: Raw Dog Screaming Press, 2019. (ISBN 978-1947879119 PB; ISBN 978-1947879157 HC)
- "The Fire-Proof Man Is Dead" – Realmscapes: Heroes of the Realm, ed. Danielle Ackley-McPhail, Pottstown, PA: Realm Makers Media, 2019, (ISBN 978-0996271844)
- "What's in the Bag, Dad?" – On the Night Border. Bowie, MD: Raw Dog Screaming Press, 2019. (ISBN 978-1947879119 PB; ISBN 978-1947879157 HC)

== See also ==
- List of horror fiction authors
