= Danielle Ackley-McPhail =

American author and editor (born 1970)

- Born: 1970 (age 55–56)
- Education: Kean College
- Occupations: Author; editor; publisher
- Spouse: Mike McPhail

Danielle Ackley-McPhail (born 1970) is an American author and editor, as well as publisher of fiction, and is best known for her work in speculative fiction. She was the editor for the Bad-Ass Faeries, which was a finalist for the Dream Realm Award for best anthology, and her novel Tomorrow's Memories was a finalist for the 2008 Dream Realm Award for best fantasy. Bad-Ass Faeries 3: In All Their Glory won the best anthology at the 2011 EPIC award for best eBook anthology.

She has worked in the publishing business as a production manager at Random House, and Marietta Publishing, an author for Mundania Press, and a promotions manager for Dark Quest.

As an editor and publisher Danielle has worked on more than thirty novels, and many anthologies, including works by authors Jody Lynn Nye, Keith DeCandido, Bud Sparhawk, James Chambers and L. Jagi Lamplighter.

Danielle is a regular speaker at industry and pop culture conventions, and has appeared as a guest speaker and panelist at Balticon Heliosphere, DerpyCon, DexCon, Shore Leave, Farpoint, Lunacon, the Maryland Faerie Festival, Confluence, and Shikkaricon.

Danielle and her husband Mike McPhail are founders and owners of eSpec Books a small press publisher.

== Personal life ==
Danielle is the youngest of five siblings. She is a graduate of Kean College and holds bachelor's degrees in both English and Communications.

Danielle lives in New Jersey with husband and fellow writer, Mike McPhail and four cats.

== Bibliography ==
=== Novels ===
- Yesterday's Dreams (2001) by Vivisphere Publishers ISBN 9781587761126
- Today's Promise (2008) by Mundania Press ISBN 9781594264085, 9781937051099
- The Halfling's Court: A Bad-Ass Faerie Tale (2010) by Dark Quest ISBN 9780979690167
- Tomorrow's Memories (2012) by Dark Quest ISBN 9781937051082
- A Legacy of Stars (2012) by Dark Quest ISBN 9781937051952
- The Redcaps’ Queen ISBN 9781937051068
- Baba Ali and the Clockwork Djinn (2014) by Dark Quest ISBN 9781937051907
- Consigned to the Sea ISBN 9781942990529
- Eternal Wanderings: The Continuing Journey of Kara O'Keefe (2019) by Paper Phoenix Press ISBN 9781942990024

=== Short fiction ===
- No Longer Dreams: An Anthology of Horror, Fantasy, and Science Fiction (2005) by Lite Circle Books ISBN 9780964162273
- Hear Them Roar (2006) by Wilder Publications ISBN 9780977304011
- Bad-Ass Faeries (2007) by Mundania Press ISBN ISBN 9781606592045
- Bad-Ass Faeries 2: Just Plain Bad (2009) by Mundania Press ISBN 9781606592069
- Bad-Ass Faeries 3: In All Their Glory (2010) by Mundania Press ISBN 9781606592083
- In An Iron Cage: The Magic of Steampunk (2011) by Dark Quest ISBN 9780983099307
- Dragon's Lure (Legends of a New Age Book One) (2010) by Dark Quest ISBN 978-0982619797
- Barbarians at the Jumpgate (2010) by Padwolf Publishing
- Consigned to the Sea (2014) by Dark Quest ISBN 9781937051969
- The Society for the Preservation of CJ Henderson (2015) by eSpec Books
- Were (2016) by Zombies Need Brains ISBN 1940709105
- If We Had Known (Beyond the Cradle Book 1) (2017) by eSpec Books
- Athena's Daughters, vol. 1: Women in Science Fiction and Fantasy

=== Non-fiction ===
- The Literary Handyman: Tips on Writing From Someone's Who's Been There (2011) by Dark Quest ISBN 9781942990659, 9781937051006
- The Ginger KICK! Cookbook ISBN 9781942990949 Paper Phoenix Press, 2018
- The Complete Guide to Writing the Paranormal Novel (2011) by Dragon Moon Press ISBN 978-1897492413
- The Complete Guide to Writing Fantasy, Volume 3: The Author's Grimoire ISBN 978-1896944357

=== As editor ===
- Bad-Ass Faeries (2007) by Mundania Press ISBN ISBN 9781606592045
- The Side of Good / The Side of Evil eSpec Books ISBN 978-1-942990-03-1
- The Clockwork Witch (2018) eSpec Books ISBN 978-1942990789
- The Best of Defending the Future eSpec Books ISBN 9781942990383
