= Lunacon =

American annual science fiction and fantasy convention

- Status: defunct
- Genre: Science fiction, Science fantasy, Fantasy
- Location: Tarrytown, New York
- Country: United States
- Inaugurated: May 12, 1957
- Most recent: 2017
- Organizer: New York Science Fiction Society - The Lunarians, Inc.
- Filing status: 501(c)3
- Website: http://www.lunacon.org/

Lunacon was an annual science fiction and fantasy convention organized by the New York Science Fiction Society - The Lunarians, Inc. Held from 1957 to 2017, it was the oldest science fiction convention in (usually) New York State, and was generally held on the third weekend of March.

The programming was a typical fannish convention, including panel discussions on a variety of topics, anime, filk music, crafts workshops, an art show and auction, a games room, and a large masquerade.

The logo commonly used for Lunacon is actually the logo of the New York Science Fiction Society - the Lunarians, Inc. and was illustrated by Wally Wood. It is the third, and most well known, version of the logo and is affectionately known as "The Loonie". Most years, one of the guest artists created his or her own variation on the logo for the convention.

In 1983 Lunacon was the first science fiction convention to feature an anime room, which was called the "Starblazers Video Room" and, according to the program book, was run by Michael Pinto, Moya Price, and Robert Fenelon.

== 2018 ==
Lunacon was not held in 2018. The HELIOsphere science fiction convention was held in the same town with some of the same staff.

"Lunacon has been a part of the New York area fannish community for over 60 years, but times have changed, fandom has changed and is more diverse, and, unlike years ago, there are many other events and conventions for our target audience to go to", said Stuart C. Hellinger, Lunarians (2) President.

== Lunacon 2017 ==
Lunacon 2017, was held at the Westchester Marriott Hotel in Tarrytown, New York on the weekend of April 7 - 9, 2017.

Guests of honor were writer Ben Bova, artist Bob Eggleton, fan Roberta Rogow, plus Musical Guests Boogie Knights (filk group) and Special Guest Artist Marianne Plumridge.

== Lunacon 2016 ==
Lunacon 2016, the 58th science fiction and fantasy convention held by the Lunarians, took place at the Hilton Westchester, in the New York City suburb of Rye Brook, New York on March 18–20, 2016.

The guests of honor were Robert J. Sawyer, Rick Sternbach, and Naomi Novik, with Musical Guests Murder Ballads.

This year's convention featured the World Premiere of Mission to Mongo (a fan edit of the 1940 serial Flash Gordon Conquers the Universe), a Leonard Nimoy Memorial Video Tribute, and the Books and More Exhibit to benefit the Donald A. and Elsie B. Wollheim Scholarship Fund.

== 2015 ==
Lunacon was not held in 2015.

== Lunacon 2014 ==
Lunacon 2014, the 57th science fiction and fantasy convention held by the Lunarians, took place at the Hilton Westchester, in the New York City suburb of Rye Brook, New York on March 18–20, 2016.

The Guests-of-Honor were:

- Writer Guest of Honor: Ryk Spoor
- Artist Guest of Honor: Randy Gallegos
- Special Guest: Michael F. Flynn

== Lunacon 2013 ==
Lunacon 2013, the 56th science fiction and fantasy convention held by the Lunarians, took place at the Hilton Westchester, in the New York City suburb of Rye Brook, New York on March 15–17, 2013.

The Guests-of-Honor were:

- Writer Guest of Honor: Michael F. Flynn
- Artist Guest of Honor: William O'Connor (artist)
- Filk Guest of Honor: Leslie Fish

== Lunacon 2012 ==
Lunacon 2012, the 55th science fiction and fantasy convention held by the Lunarians, took place at the Hilton Rye Town, in the New York City suburb of Rye Brook, New York on March 16–18, 2012.

The Guests-of-Honor were:

- Writer Guest of Honor: John Ringo
- Artist Guest of Honor: Howard Tayler
- YA Writer Guest of Honor: Tamora Pierce

== Lunacon 2011 ==
Lunacon 2011, the 54th science fiction and fantasy convention held by the Lunarians, took place at the Hilton Rye Town, on March 18–20, 2011.

The Guests-of-Honor were:

- Writer Guest of Honor: Lawrence M. Schoen
- Artist Guest of Honor: Rachael Mayo
- Special Guest: Eric "in the Elevator" Zuckerman
- Gaming Guests of Honor: Kristin and Andrew Looney

== Lunacon 2010 ==
Lunacon 2010, the 53rd science fiction and fantasy convention held by the Lunarians, took place at the Hilton Rye Town, on March 19–21, 2010.

The Guests-of-Honor were:

- Writer Guest of Honor: Tanya Huff
- Artist Guest of Honor: Theresa Mather
- Musical Guest of Honor: Allison Lonsdale
- Special Guest: Mercedes Lackey
- Fan Guest of Honor: Dominick Corrado

== Lunacon 2009 ==
Lunacon 2009, the 52nd science fiction and fantasy convention held by the Lunarians, took place at the Hilton Rye Town, on March 20–22, 2009.

The Guests-of-Honor were:

- Writer Guest of Honor: Dave Freer
- Artist Guest of Honor: Larry Dixon
- Special Guest: Mercedes Lackey
- Toastmaster: Eric Flint
- Fan Guest of Honor: Leigh Ronald Grossman – Erstwhile Lunacon Co-Programming Head

== Lunacon 2008 ==
Lunacon 2008, the 51st science fiction and fantasy convention held by the Lunarians, took place at the Hilton Rye Town, on March 14–16, 2008.

The Guests-of-Honor were:

- Writer Guest of Honor: Jacqueline Carey, author of the Kushiel series
- Artist Guest of Honor: Johnna Y. Klukas, sculptor extraordinaire
- Fan Guest of Honor: Joseph D. Siclari, preserver and archivist of fannish history
- Special Guest of Honor: Winston A. Howlett, author and costumer

== Lunacon 2007 ==
Lunacon 2007, a.k.a. Lunacon 50, held on March 16–18, 2007, was the 50th science fiction and fantasy convention held by the Lunarians. (1964 was skipped, so not numbered.) After two years in New Jersey, 2007 also marked the return to its long-time venue at the Hilton Rye Town, referred to by fans as "The Escher Hilton" due to its construction which includes the infamous "Transdimensional Warp Corridor" that allows attendees to walk from the fourth floor to the function areas on the seventh floor without using any stairs or elevators.

The Guests-of-Honor were:

- Writer Guest of Honor: Christopher Moore
- Artist Guest of Honor: Dave Seeley
- Fan Guest of Honor: Frank Dietz

== Lunacon 2006 ==
Lunacon 2006 occurred March 17–20, 2006 in the Hilton Hasbrouck Heights/Meadowlands, in Hasbrouck Heights, New Jersey. It was generally considered to go off well, unlike the year before, at a different hotel, considering that the hotel was still under renovation. This was the 49th Lunacon.

The Guests-of-Honor were:

- Writer GoH: Jim Butcher
- Artist GoH: David B. Mattingly
- Fan GoH: Byron Connell
- Costuming Guest of Honor: Lisa Ashton

== See also ==
- Heliosphere (science fiction convention)
