= Mike McPhail =

American novelist

- Occupation: Author
- Spouse: Danielle Ackley-McPhail

Mike McPhail is an American author, editor, and game designer as well as publisher of fiction, and is best known for his work in military fiction.

McPhail has spoken at industry and pop culture conventions, and has appeared as a guest speaker and panelist at Balticon, Confluence, Heliosphere, LunaCon, DerpyCon, DexCon, Far Point, Shikkaricon, and Shore Leave.

He is a member of the Military Writers Society of America (MWSA), and the creator of the Alliance Archives (All'Arc) series and its related Martial Role-Playing Game (MRPG)

McPhail and his wife Danielle Ackley-McPhail are founders and owners of ESpec Books. a small press publisher.

So It Begins was a finalist for Best Anthology at the 2009 Indie Book Awards.

== Personal life ==
McPhail attended the Academy of Aeronautics in New York (now the Vaughn College of Aeronautics and Technology) and served in the Air National Guard.

== Bibliography ==
=== Short fiction ===
==== Defending the Future Series ====
- Breach the Hull (2007) by Dark Quest ISBN 9780979690198
- So It Begins (2009) ISBN 978-0979690150
- By Other Means (2011) ISBN 9780983099352
- No Man's Land (2011) ISBN 9781937051020
- Best Laid Plans (2013) ISBN 9781937051044
- Dogs of War (2013) ISBN 9781937051051
- Man and Machine (2016) ISBN 9781942990093
- In Harm's Way (In Production)
- The Best of Defending the Future ISBN 9781942990390

==== Beyond the Cradle Series ====
- If We Had Known (Beyond the Cradle Book 1) (2017) by eSpec Books

==== Other Anthologies ====
- Jaelle Her Book ISBN 9781934754146
- Cowboys in Space: Tales of Byanntia
- The Die Is Cast ISBN 9781942990253
- Fallen City ISBN 9780991317110
- Barbarians at the Jumpgate ISBN 9781890096434
- The Stories in Between: A Between Books Anthology ISBN 9780971360884
