= Drain (comics) =

Publication information
- Publisher: Image Comics
- Schedule: Bi-Monthly
- Format: Limited series
- Genre: Horror
- Publication date: November 2006 - March 2008
- No. of issues: 6

Creative team
- Created by: C. B. Cebulski
- Written by: C. B. Cebulski
- Artist: Sana Takeda
- Letterer: Cory Petit
- Colorist: Sana Takeda

Collected editions
- Volume 1: ISBN 1-58240-752-5

Drain is a creator-owned comic, written by C. B. Cebulski and painted by Sana Takeda. It was published by American company Image Comics in 2006–2008, for a total of six issues, collected in a trade paperback in 2008.

== Plot ==
Chinatsu, a vampiress from Japan, looks for her family's killer, and also her vampire sire. She mercilessly searches throughout many time periods and centuries in order to exact her revenge.

Cebulski described the plot as follows, "Chinatsu was left as the sole survivor in order to recount the horror she and her clan had suffered and spread fear across the land. She was to become an immortal example of the fate that would befall those who crossed the vampires. Instead, Chinatsu has made it her mission to make them regret their actions".

== Collected editions ==
A trade paperback (ISBN 1582407525) was published in May 2008 and included the six issues, with Sana Takeda re-mastering and re-coloring the artwork. It also included an additional behind-the-scenes, Making of Drain, part.

== Sources ==
- Drain at the Grand Comics Database
- Drain at the Comic Book DB (archived from the original)
