= Throne of the Crescent Moon =

2012 novel by Saladin Ahmed

Throne of the Crescent Moon عرش الهلال
- Author: Saladin Ahmed
- Cover artist: Jason Chan
- Language: English
- Series: The Crescent Moon Kingdoms
- Genre: Fantasy
- Publisher: DAW Books
- Publication date: February 7, 2012
- Publication place: United States
- Media type: Print (hardback and paperback), audiobook, e-book
- Pages: 304
- ISBN: 978-0-7564-0711-7
- OCLC: 823141937
- Followed by: The Thousand and One

Throne of the Crescent Moon is a fantasy novel written by American writer Saladin Ahmed. It is the first book in The Crescent Moon Kingdoms series. The book was published by DAW Books in February 2012. The book was nominated for the 2013 Hugo Award for Best Novel, 2013 David Gemmell Morningstar Award for Best Fantasy Newcomer and the 2012 Nebula Award for Best Novel. It won the 2013 Locus Award for Best First Novel.

== Plot summary ==
The book follows Doctor Adoulla Makhslood, an aging ghul hunter based in the city of Dhamsawaat, who would really like to retire from having adventures and quietly drink cardamom tea. Events rapidly transpire to force the Doctor and his assistant, Raseed bas Raseed – a Dervish warrior sworn to a holy path – to face a dark sorcerer. To aid them in this, the Doctor recruits his two old friends Dawoud and Litaz. Dawoud is a mage whose spells draw upon his own life energy and Litaz (his wife) is a highly skilled alchemist. The final member of their band is Zamia, a young Badawi tribeswoman who has been gifted with the ability to take a lion's shape and whose band has been slain by the sorcerer. In addition to the magical plot, there is political trouble brewing in the city as the mysterious Falcon Prince foments revolution against the Kalif.

== Reception ==
Reviewers have praised its Middle Eastern sourced setting novel for being different from the typical Euro-centric fantasy novel. Annalee Newitz reviewing for io9 praised the characters and worldbuilding."
