= Saladin Ahmed =

American poet and writer

- Born: October 4, 1975 (age 51); Detroit, Michigan, U.S.
- Education: Rutgers University (MA); Brooklyn College (MFA); University of Michigan (BA); Henry Ford Community College
- Occupation: Writer
- Writing career
- Years active: 2000–present
- Genres: Science fiction, fantasy, superheroes, poetry

Saladin Ahmed (born October 4, 1975) is an American comic book writer and a science fiction/fantasy poetry and prose writer. His 2012 book Throne of the Crescent Moon was nominated for the Hugo Award for Best Novel and won the Locus Award for Best First Novel. Ahmed's fiction has been published in anthologies and magazines including Strange Horizons, Orson Scott Card's InterGalactic Medicine Show, Clockwork Phoenix 2 and Beneath Ceaseless Skies. He is currently writing Daredevil and has previously written other series for Marvel Comics such as Black Bolt, Exiles, Miles Morales: Spider-Man, The Magnificent Ms. Marvel, Quicksilver, and Wolverine. He is also the co-creator of the comic series Abbott and its sequels Abbott: 1973 and Abbott: 1979.

== Early life ==
Ahmed was born in 1975 in Detroit, Michigan, to parents of Lebanese, Egyptian, Irish, and Polish descent. His father, Ismael Ahmed, formerly in the merchant marine, worked both in a factory and as a community organizer. His mother was a political activist. Ahmed is Muslim.

After graduating from high school, Ahmed attended Henry Ford Community College before transferring to the University of Michigan in Ann Arbor. After receiving a BA in American Studies, Ahmed earned an MFA at Brooklyn College and an MA in English from Rutgers University.

== Career ==
=== Poetry and prose ===
Ahmed's poetry has been published in various literary journals and books and has been awarded fellowships from the University of Michigan, Brooklyn College, and the Bronx Council on the Arts. Ahmed's science fiction and fantasy stories have been published in magazines and anthologies including Strange Horizons, Orson Scott Card's InterGalactic Medicine Show, Clockwork Phoenix 2, and Beneath Ceaseless Skies. In 2010, he was a finalist for the John W. Campbell Award for Best New Writer.

Ahmed's story "Hooves and the Hovel of Abdel Jameela", originally published in Clockwork Phoenix 2, was a finalist for the 2010 Nebula Award for Best Short Story.

In February 2012, Ahmed's debut novel, Throne of the Crescent Moon, was published by DAW Books. It was announced as the first of a trilogy. The novels are fantasies inspired by One Thousand and One Nights. In 2021, The Washington Post commented that "though Saladin Ahmed may be best known for his comic book work, 'Throne of the Crescent Moon,' a Middle Eastern-inspired fantasy novel, garnered him a Locus Award in 2013".

In October 2017, Ahmed gained media attention for a Twitter post addressed to the cereal company Kellogg's: "why is literally the only brown corn pop on the whole cereal box the janitor? this is teaching kids racism." Kellogg's indicated they would change the artwork on future Corn Pops shipments.

=== Comics ===
In 2016, Ahmed was approached by Marvel Comics editor Wil Moss to write a series focusing on the character Black Bolt due to Ahmed's background in fantasy and science fiction. Ahmed, with artist Christian Ward, began writing an ongoing series titled Black Bolt in May 2017. Ahmed and Ward won the 2018 Eisner Award for Best New Series for Black Bolt while the trade paperback collection of the comic, Black Bolt, Volume 1: Hard Time, was a finalist for the 2018 Hugo Award for Best Graphic Story. The series was cancelled in 2018 after twelve issues.

In 2018, Ahmed relaunched two new ongoing series for Marvel Comics – Miles Morales: Spider-Man with artist Javier Garron and Exiles with artist Javier Rodriguez. Zack Quaintance, for The Beat, called Ahmed "a rising star at Marvel, having written the critically-acclaimed Black Bolt and currently writing Miles Morales: Spider-Man and Exiles". Also in 2018, Ahmed wrote the creator-owned limited series Abbott with artist Sami Kivela; it was published by Boom! Studios. Sequels, titled Abbott: 1973 and Abbott: 1979, were released in 2021 and 2024, respectively.

In 2019, Ahmed and artist Minkyu Jung became the creative team for the Ms. Marvel relaunch titled The Magnificent Ms. Marvel. IGN highlighted The Magnificent Ms. Marvel on its list for "Best Comic Book Series of 2019". The series was cancelled in February 2021 after eighteen issues. Charlie Ridgely, for ComicBook.com, highlighted that The Magnificent Ms. Marvel was "an incredible challenge" for Ahmed since he had to follow the character's original creator G. Willow Wilson. Ridgely commented that "Ahmed has leaned hard into the issues that plague our current lives while still making the comic uplifting" and that "every revelation that Kamala comes to is thoroughly earned and formed based on the specific experiences we see her confront. It's a master class in evolving a character while keeping them grounded in their own identity".

Ahmed was #10 on CBR's "10 Best Marvel Comics Writers of the Last Decade" list. Ahmed was nominated for "Best Comic Book Writer of 2020" by IGN — the article states that Miles Morales and Kamala Khan are "characters closely intertwined with their respective creators. It says a great deal that Saladin Ahmed has managed to take the reins of both Miles and Kamala's solo books and truly make these characters his own. Plus, he delivered a rollicking good Conan tale in Battle for the Serpent Crown".

In July 2020, Ahmed and Dave Acosta successively funded an original graphic novel, titled Dragon, through Kickstarter. SyFy Wire highlighted that the Kickstarter "blew past its initial $40,000 goal and surpassed $100,000 just 10 days into the campaign". In August 2021, Ahmed was one of the announced creators included in Substack's "major investment in the comics market in the form of new agreements with some of the biggest names in the medium at the moment". The New York Times highlighted that "the creators will be paid by Substack while keeping ownership of their work. The company will take most of the subscription revenue in the first year; after that, it will take a 10 percent cut". Ahmed stated that Substack would be the home of Copper Bottle, a "subscription-based pop-up imprint publishing original comics" written by him and featuring various illustrators.

In August 2021, Ahmed was among a group of creators with whom fellow comics writer Nick Spencer formed a deal with the subscription-based newsletter platform Substack to publish creator-owned comics stories, essays, and instructional guides on that platform. Ahmed indicated that he and artist Dave Acosta would collaborate on the science fiction comic Terrorwar, which is set in a future where people are forced to confront the physical manifestation of their fears.

In May 2023, it was announced that Ahmed would become the new writer of Daredevil, with Aaron Kuder set to illustrate and the series set to debut September later that year.

== Awards and nominations ==
Year	Award	Category	Work	Result	Ref.
2009	Harper's Pen Award	Best Sword and Sorcery/Heroic Fantasy Short Story	"Where Virtue Lives"	Finalist	
2010	Nebula Award	Best Short Story	"Hooves and the Hovel of Abdel Jameela"	Finalist	
2010	John W. Campbell Award for Best New Writer			Finalist	
2011	John W. Campbell Award for Best New Writer			Finalist (Note: Finalist in their 2nd year of eligibility)	
2012	Nebula Award	Best Novel	Throne of the Crescent Moon	Finalist	
2013	Hugo Award	Best Novel	Throne of the Crescent Moon	Finalist	
2013	Locus Award	Best First Novel	Throne of the Crescent Moon	Won	
2018	Eisner Award	Best New Series	Black Bolt (2017)	Won	
2018	Hugo Award	Best Graphic Story	Black Bolt, Volume 1: Hard Time	Finalist	
2019	Hugo Award	Best Graphic Story	Abbott	Finalist	
2020	Dragon Awards	Best Graphic Novel	Black Bolt	Finalist	
2022	Ignyte Awards	Best Comics Team	Abbott: 1973	Nominated	

== Works ==
=== Novels ===
- Throne of the Crescent Moon (DAW Books, 2012, ISBN 978-0-7564-0711-7)

=== Comics and graphic novels ===
==== Marvel Comics ====
- Black Bolt #1–12 (with Christian Ward, ongoing, 2017–2018)
  - Black Bolt Vol. 1: Hard Time (collects #1–6, trade paperback, October 2017, ISBN 978-1-302-90732-7)
  - Black Bolt Vol. 2: Home Free (collects #7–12, trade paperback, April 2018, ISBN 978-1-302-90733-4)
  - Black Bolt (collects #1–12, hardcover, January 2020, ISBN 978-1-302-92140-8)
- Exiles #1–12 (with Javier Rodriguez, ongoing, 2018–2019)
  - Exiles Vol. 1: Test of Time (collects #1–6, trade paperback, September 2018, ISBN 978-1-302-91165-2)
  - Exiles Vol. 2: The Trial Of The Exiles (collects #7–12, trade paperback, March 2019, ISBN 978-1-302-91166-9)
- Quicksilver: No Surrender #1–5 (with Eric Nguyen, limited series, 2018)
  - Quicksilver: No Surrender (collects #1–5, trade paperback, November 2018, ISBN 978-1-302-91295-6)
- Amazing Spider-Man Annual #1 (with Garry Brown, one-shot, September 2018)
- Miles Morales: Spider-Man #1–42 (with various artists, ongoing, 2018–2022)
  - Miles Morales Vol. 1: Straight Out Of Brooklyn (with Javier Garrón, collects #1–6, trade paperback, July 2019, ISBN 978-1-302-91478-3)
  - Miles Morales Vol. 2: Bring On The Bad Guys (with writer Tom Taylor and artists Alitha E. Martinez, Javier Garrón, Vanesa Del Rey, Ron Ackins, Cory Smith, collects #7–10 and Free Comic Book Day 2019 Spider-Man/Venom #1, trade paperback, July 2019, ISBN 978-1-302-91478-3)
  - Miles Morales: Spider-Man Vol. 3: Family Business (with Ray-Anthony Height, Kevin Libranda, Belen Ortega, Javier Garrón, Ze Carlos, Alitha E. Martinez, Ig Guara, collects #11–15, trade paperback, July 2020, ISBN 978-1-302-92016-6)
  - Miles Morales Vol. 4: Ultimatum (with Carmen Carnero, Cory Smith, Marcelo Ferreira, collects #16–21, trade paperback, February 2021, ISBN 978-1-302-92017-3)
  - Miles Morales Vol. 5: The Clone Saga (with writer Cody Ziglar and artists Natacha Bustos, Carmen Carnero, collects #22–28, trade paperback, September 2021, ISBN 978-1-302-92601-4)
  - Miles Morales Vol. 6: All Eyes On Me (with Christopher Allen, Carmen Carnero, collects #29–32, trade paperback, January 2022, ISBN 978-1-302-92602-1)
  - Miles Morales Vol. 7: Beyond (with Christopher Allen, Michele Bandini, collects #33–36 and Miles Morales: Spider-Man Annual #1, trade paperback, June 2022, ISBN 9781302932657)
  - Miles Morales Vol 8 : Empire of the Spider (with Christopher Allen, Alberto Foche, collects #37–42, trade paperback, December 2022, ISBN 978-1302933128)
- The Magnificent Ms. Marvel #1-18 (with various artists, ongoing, 2019–2021)
  - Ms. Marvel by Saladin Ahmed Vol. 1: Destined (with Minkyu Jung, collects #1-6, trade paperback, October 2019, ISBN 978-1-302-91829-3)
  - Ms. Marvel By Saladin Ahmed Vol. 2: Stormranger (with Minkyu Jung, Joey Vazquez, collects #7–12, trade paperback, April 2020, ISBN 978-1-302-91830-9)
  - Ms. Marvel by Saladin Ahmed Vol. 3: Outlawed (with Joey Vazquez, Minkyu Jung, collects #13–18, trade paperback, May 2021, ISBN 978-1-302-92500-0)
- Absolute Carnage: Miles Morales #1–3 (with Federico Vicentini, limited series, 2019)
  - Absolute Carnage: Miles Morales (with writer Jed MacKay and artists Stefano Raffaele, Federico Vicentini, collects #1–3 and Absolute Carnage: Weapon Plus #1, trade paperback, September 2021, ISBN 978-1-302-92014-2)
- Conan: Battle For The Serpent Crown #1–5 (with Luke Ross, limited series, 2019)
  - Conan: Battle For The Serpent Crown (collects #1–5, trade paperback, November 2020, ISBN 978-1-302-92446-1)
- Wolverine: Black, White & Blood #2 (with writers Chris Claremont, Vita Ayala and artists Salvador Larroca, Greg Land, Kev Walker, limited series, 2020)
- Wolverine #1–current (with Martin Coccolo, ongoing, 2024–)
  - Wolverine by Saladin Ahmed Vol. 1: In The Bones (collects #1–5, trade paperback, May 2025, ISBN 978-1-302-95803-9)

==== Creator-owned ====
- Abbott #1–5 (with Sami Kivela, limited series, 2018)
  - Abbott (collects #1–5, trade paperback, October 2018, ISBN 978-1-68415-245-2)
- Abbott: 1973 #1-5 (with Sami Kivela, limited series, 2021)
  - Abbott: 1973 (collects #1–5, trade paperback, October 2021, ISBN 978-1-68415-651-1)
- Dragon (with Dave Acosta, self-published graphic novel, 2022)

==== DC Comics ====
- Harley Quinn: Black + White + Red #3 (with Javier Rodriguez, single issue in anthology series, 2020)

=== Collections ===
- Engraved on the Eye (Ridan Publishing, 2012)

=== Short stories ===
- "The Plan" from From a Certain Point of View: Return of the Jedi, (Del Rey, August 2023)
- "Rules of the Game" from Star Wars: Canto Bight (Del Rey, December 2017)
- "Without Faith, Without Law, Without Joy" – Rags & Bones, ed. By Melissa Marr, Tim Pratt (Little, Brown Books for Young Readers, October 2013)
- "Amethyst, Shadow, and Light" – Fearsome Journeys, ed. Jonathan Strahan (Solaris, May 2013)
- "The Faithful Soldier, Prompted" – Apex Magazine 18, November 2010

podcast by StarShipSofa

- "Mister Hadj's Sunset Ride" – Beneath Ceaseless Skies, May 2010
- "General Akmed's Revenge?" – Expanded Horizons 16, March 2010
- "Doctor Diablo Goes Through The Motions" – Strange Horizons, February 2010

podcast by DrabbleCast

- "Judgment of Swords and Souls" – Orson Scott Card's InterGalactic Medicine Show
- "Hooves and the Hovel of Abdel Jameela" – Clockwork Phoenix 2, ed. by Mike Allen (Norilana Books, July 2009)

podcast by PodCastle

- "Where Virtue Lives – Beneath Ceaseless Skies, April 2009

=== Poetry ===
Ahmed's poetry has appeared in the following journals and anthologies:

- Callaloo Volume 32, Issue 4 (2009)
- Against Agamemnon: War Poetry (WaterWood Press 2009)
- Inclined to Speak: An Anthology of Contemporary Arab American Poetry (University of Arkansas Press 2008)
- Margie: The American Journal of Poetry Volume 6 (2007)
- We Begin Here: Poems for Palestine and Lebanon (Interlink Books 2007)
- The Brooklyn Review #19 (2002)
- The Brooklyn Review #18 (2001)
- Big City Lit (2001)
- Mizna Volume 3, Issue 1 (2001)
- Abandon Automobile: Detroit City Poetry (Wayne State University Press 2001)
- Post Gibran: Anthology of New Arab American Writing (Kitab/Syracuse University Press 2000)
- Arab Detroit: From Margin to Mainstream (Wayne State University Press 2000)
