= Undone by Blood =

American comic book series

Publication information
- Publisher: AfterShock Comics
- Schedule: Monthly, with gaps between arcs
- Format: Ongoing series
- Genre: Western
- Publication date: February 2020 – present
- No. of issues: 5

Creative team
- Written by: Lonnie Nadler; Zac Thompson
- Artist(s): Sami Kivelä
- Letterer(s): Hassan Otsmane-Elhaou
- Colorist(s): Jason Wordie

Undone by Blood is an ongoing American comic book series written by Lonnie Nadler and Zac Thompson and drawn by artist Sami Kivelä. The series largely focuses on the exploits and adventures of Solomon Eaton, a famous gunslinger, through various time periods. Nadler has described the series as "a look at how the myth of the cowboy has permeated our culture, and remains ingrained in our narratives of violence and retribution."

The comic's first arc, entitled Undone by Blood: Or the Shadow of a Wanted Man and composed of five issues, was released by AfterShock Comics from February to August 2020. A second arc, Undone by Blood: Or the Other Side of Eden, is scheduled to release in 2021.

A television adaptation is currently in production.

== Synopsis ==
=== Shadow of a Wanted Man ===
The first arc is set during the early 1970s in the United States and focuses primarily on two characters: Ethel Grady Lane, a woman seeking revenge for the murder of her family, and Solomon Eaton, a famed gunslinger. Lacking a concrete identity of the killer but aware that he must be someone in her hometown of Sweetheart, Arizona, Ethel approaches Solomon for assistance. This places not only themselves in mortal danger, but also Solomon's son.

=== The Other Side of Eden ===
The second arc is set during the Great Depression, many years prior to the events in Shadow of a Wanted Man. It features Solomon as well as Silvano Luna Del Rio, a postman turned robber.

== Publication history ==
AfterShock Comics released the first issue of Shadow of a Wanted Man in February 2020. Four additional issues comprising the first story arc of the Undone by Blood series were released on a monthly basis through August of the same year. These issues were collected in a single volume that was released in November 2020 and featured a foreword from Norman Reedus.

In August 2020, AfterShock Comics announced plans for a second story arc, The Other Side of Eden, which will be released at an as of yet undetermined time in 2021.

== Adaptation ==
In September 2020, AMC announced that it was developing a television series adaptation of Undone by Blood with Norman Reedus, who would serve as executive producer through his new company Bigbaldhead Productions. JoAnne Colonna and Amanda Verdon will also serve as producers alongside Lonnie Nadler and Zac Thompson, as well as AfterShock’s Lee and Jon Kramer. In a press statement, Thompson voiced his endorsement of Reedus portraying Solomon Eaton.

== Reception ==
The first issue of Shadow of a Wanted Man was reviewed by Monkeys Fighting Robots and Multiversity Comics, the latter of which rated it a 9.4/10 and wrote that it was "A satisfying gritty neo-Western that sets the lawless, brutal, and nasty human condition against the backdrop of a hauntingly desolate and beautiful desert town."
