= Susan Carpenter =

American writer

- Born: Susan Carpenter
- Occupations: Writer, pirate radio personality
- Writing career
- Language: English
- Genre: Non-fiction
- Notable works: 40 Watts from Nowhere, A Journey into Pirate Radio, New York: Scribner, 2004
- Website: www.girlonamotorcycle.la/home/

Susan Carpenter is co-host of The Ride, a series about modern mobility on the Southern California Public Radio station KPCC-FM. In broadcast radio segments and a weekly podcast, she reports on everything from autonomous cars and ride sharing to motorcycles, bicycles and public transit.

Before joining KPCC, Carpenter was the car and motorcycle critic for the Los Angeles Times and the Orange County Register. She is also known for operating two illegal pirate-radio stations and writing about unconventional adventures for the women's magazine Jane which she undertook in order to experience them firsthand.

A University of Wisconsin–Madison graduate, Carpenter was working as a legal secretary in San Francisco, California, in 1995, when she began pseudonymously running an illegal all-music pirate-radio station, which she named "KPBJ", after the sandwich. The station operated for three-and-a-half years before the FCC shut it down. During those years, KPBJ grew from interviewing relatively unknown guests to hosting live performances by such bands as the Red Hot Chili Peppers and Jane's Addiction.

In 1998, Carpenter took a job as editor of the niche culture magazine UHF and moved to Los Angeles, where, under the alias "Paige Jarrett", she founded a new pirate station, "KBLT", also named after the sandwich, in the hipster Los Angeles community of Silver Lake. KBLT's deejays included Bob Forrest, Mike Watt and Keith Morris., performers included Mazzy Star, who played a benefit to help pay her legal fees, and the station featured bootleg world premieres of songs by Beck, Madonna, and Jesus and Mary Chain.

Carpenter's writing has also appeared in George, Marie Claire, and Cosmopolitan. She has written about topics as diverse as working as a Hooters girl, posing nude for Playboy magazine, joining the Army, working on a chain gang, competing in a Hawaiian Tropic tanning contest, and trying out for the Los Angeles Lakers dance squad, the Laker Girls, and has provided insider commentary about pirate radio happenings. In October 2012, Carpenter moved to the Orange County Register as automobile and motorcycle columnist.

In 2004, Carpenter wrote a book about her experiences as a pirate-radio operator which has been described as "sine qua non for anyone who aspires to run any kind of community-style radio station" due to the details it provides about the college, community, and pirate scene.
