= Kathy Ceceri =

American author and educator

Kathy Ceceri is an American author and educator who has written young adult books on technology and STEM subjects. She wrote for the Wired blog, and lives in upstate New York. She travels as a presenter at schools and workshops.

Her books have been published by Nomad Press in Vermont.

== Writing ==
- Ceceri, Kathy (March 1, 2010). World Myths and Legends: 25 Projects You Can Build Yourself. Nomad Press. ISBN 978-1-61930-054-5 – via Google Books.
- The Silk Road; Explore the World's Most Famous Trade Route with 20 Projects (2011)
- Ceceri, Kathy (October 4, 2012). Robotics: Discover the Science and Technology of the Future with 20 Projects. Nomad Press. ISBN 978-1-936749-76-8 – via Google Books.
- Geek Mom; Projects, Tips, and Adventures for Moms and Their 21st-Century Families (2012), co-author
- Ceceri, Kathy (May 12, 2014). MICRONATIONS: Invent Your Own Country and Culture with 25 Projects. Nomad Press. ISBN 978-1-61930-220-4 – via Google Books.
- Ceceri, Kathy (February 19, 2015). Making Simple Robots: Exploring Cutting-Edge Robotics with Everyday Stuff. Maker Media, Inc. ISBN 978-1-4571-8359-1 – via Google Books.
- Ceceri, Kathy (September 8, 2015). Make: Paper Inventions: Machines that Move, Drawings that Light Up, and Wearables and Structures You Can Cut, Fold, and Roll. Maker Media, Inc. ISBN 978-1-4571-8748-3 – via Google Books.
- Ceceri, Kathy (April 27, 2017). Musical Inventions. Maker Media. ISBN 978-1-68045-229-7 – via books.google.com.
- Video Games; Design and Code Your Own Adventure (2015)
- Fabric and Fiber Inventions: Sew, Knit, Print, and Electrify Your Own Designs to Wear, Use, and Play With (2017)
- Ceceri, Kathy (October 4, 2019). "Bots!: Robotic Engineering : with Hands-on Makerspace Activities". Nomad Press – via Google Books.
- Ceceri, Kathy (September 2, 2016). Edible Inventions: Cooking Hacks and Yummy Recipes You Can Build, Mix, Bake, and Grow. Maker Media, Inc. ISBN 9781680452051 – via Google Books.
- Discover the Desert

=== Articles ===
- "Growing Crystals for Power"
