= Sana Takeda =

Japanese illustrator and comic book artist (born 1977)

- Born: 1977 (age 48–49) Niigata, Japan
- Areas: Manga artist, Letterer, Colourist
- Notable works: Monstress
- Awards: Hugo Award, Eisner Award

Sana Takeda (タケダサナ, Takeda Sana) (born 1977) is a Japanese illustrator and comic book artist known for her work on the Hugo Award winning series Monstress.

== Biography ==
Takeda was born in Niigata, and now resides in Tokyo, Japan. At age 20 Takeda started working as a 3D CGI designer for Sega, creating pictures of soccer and NBA athletes. She became a freelance artist when she was 25. After sending her portfolio to C. B. Cebulski, she began working on several projects for Marvel Comics, including X-Men, Venom, Civil War II and Ms. Marvel. From 2006 to 2008 she worked with C. B. Cebulski on their creator-owned series Drain. In 2010 she started to work with Marjorie Liu on X-23 for Marvel Comics and in 2013 the two started to work on their creator-owned series Monstress.

The artists identified by Takeda as major influences include: Kuniyoshi Utagawa's ukiyo-e woodblock prints, Shigeru Mizuki's yōkai (Japanese spirits) art, and illustrations of Ishihara Gōjin.

== Bibliography ==
=== Interior art ===
- X-Men Fairy Tales #1 (Marvel, 2006)
- Drain (Image Comics, 2006-2008)
- X-Men Divided We Stand #1, part 2 (Marvel, 2008)
- Ms. Marvel Vol. 2 #39, 40, 42, 44, 46, 48-50 (Marvel, 2009-2010)
- Web of Spider-man Vol. 2 #9-11 (Marvel, 2010)-
- X-Men Forever Annual (with colorist Simone Peruzzi, Marvel, 2010)
- What If? Dark Reign (Marvel, 2010)
- X-23 Vol. 3 #3, 7, 10-12, 17-19 (Marvel, 2010-2011)
- Incredible Hulks #621, part 2 (Marvel, 2011)
- Venom Vol. 2 #13.2 (Marvel, 2012)
- Soulfire: Shadow Magic Volume 1 (Aspen Comics, 2013)
- Civil War II: Choosing Sides #6, part 2 (Marvel, 2016)
- Monstress (Image Comics, 2015-present)
- The Night Eaters (Abrams, 2022-2025)
