= Monstress (comics) =

Comics book series by Marjorie Liu and Sana Takeda

- Monstress #1 cover

Publication information
- Publisher: Image Comics
- Format: Ongoing series
- Genre: Dark fantasy; Steampunk
- Publication date: November 2015 – present
- No. of issues: 64 (plus 2 Talk Stories issues)
- Main characters: Maika Halfwolf; Kippa; Ren Mormorian; Zinn the Monstrum; Corvin D'Oro

Creative team
- Created by: Marjorie Liu & Sana Takeda
- Written by: Marjorie Liu
- Artist: Sana Takeda
- Letterer: Rus Wooton
- Editor(s): Jennifer M. Smith, Ceri Riley

Collected editions
- 1. Awakening: ISBN 9781632157096
- 2. The Blood: ISBN 9781534300415
- 3. Haven: ISBN 9781534306912
- 4. The Chosen: ISBN 9781534313361
- 5. Warchild: ISBN 9781534316614
- 6. The Vow: ISBN 9781534319158
- 7. Devourer: ISBN 9781534323193
- 8. Inferno: ISBN 9781534399525
- 9. The Possessed: ISBN 9781534392618
- 10. Hollow Gods: ISBN 9781534332690

Monstress is an ongoing epic fantasy comics series written by Marjorie Liu and drawn by Sana Takeda, published since November 2015 by the American publisher Image Comics.

The series has earned many awards, including seven Eisner Awards, four Hugo Awards, and the Harvey Awards Book of the Year in 2018.

== Summary ==
The series is set in a matriarchal world inspired by early 20th-century Asia, and tells the story of Maika Halfwolf, a teenage girl who shares a mysterious psychic link with a powerful monster. The background to the story is a war between the Arcanics, magical creatures who sometimes can pass for human, and the human Federation, led by the Cumaea, an order of sorceresses who consume Arcanics to fuel their power. Maika is an Arcanic who looks human, and who is set on learning about and avenging her dead mother. Maika's left arm has been severed and a "monster", Zinn, occasionally emerges from its stub. The demon, who takes over her body and mind, is a source of great power, but challenging for Maika to understand and control. The story unfolds as Maika navigates through the power games of humans and Arcanics while learning truths about the "Ancients" and her family.

== Publication history ==
Liu first introduced the story to Takeda in 2013. The two started working together a year later, and the first issue was published in November 2015; the trade paperback first volume in July 2016, the second in July 2017, the third in September 2018, and the fourth in September 2019.

Liu has said that she struggled with depression before writing Monstress. She had taken a hiatus from writing before returning to the industry with Image Comics.

She has described the comic as "a huge epic fantasy." As such, the story required world-building. The first issue was triple-sized (70 pages) in order to properly introduce the various characters and factions.

Liu and Takeda first worked together on Liu's run of X-23 for Marvel. Liu would later describe her work with Takeda as "a wonderful process; it felt like she was reading my mind." A native of Japan, Takeda's art takes inspiration from manga.

== Themes ==
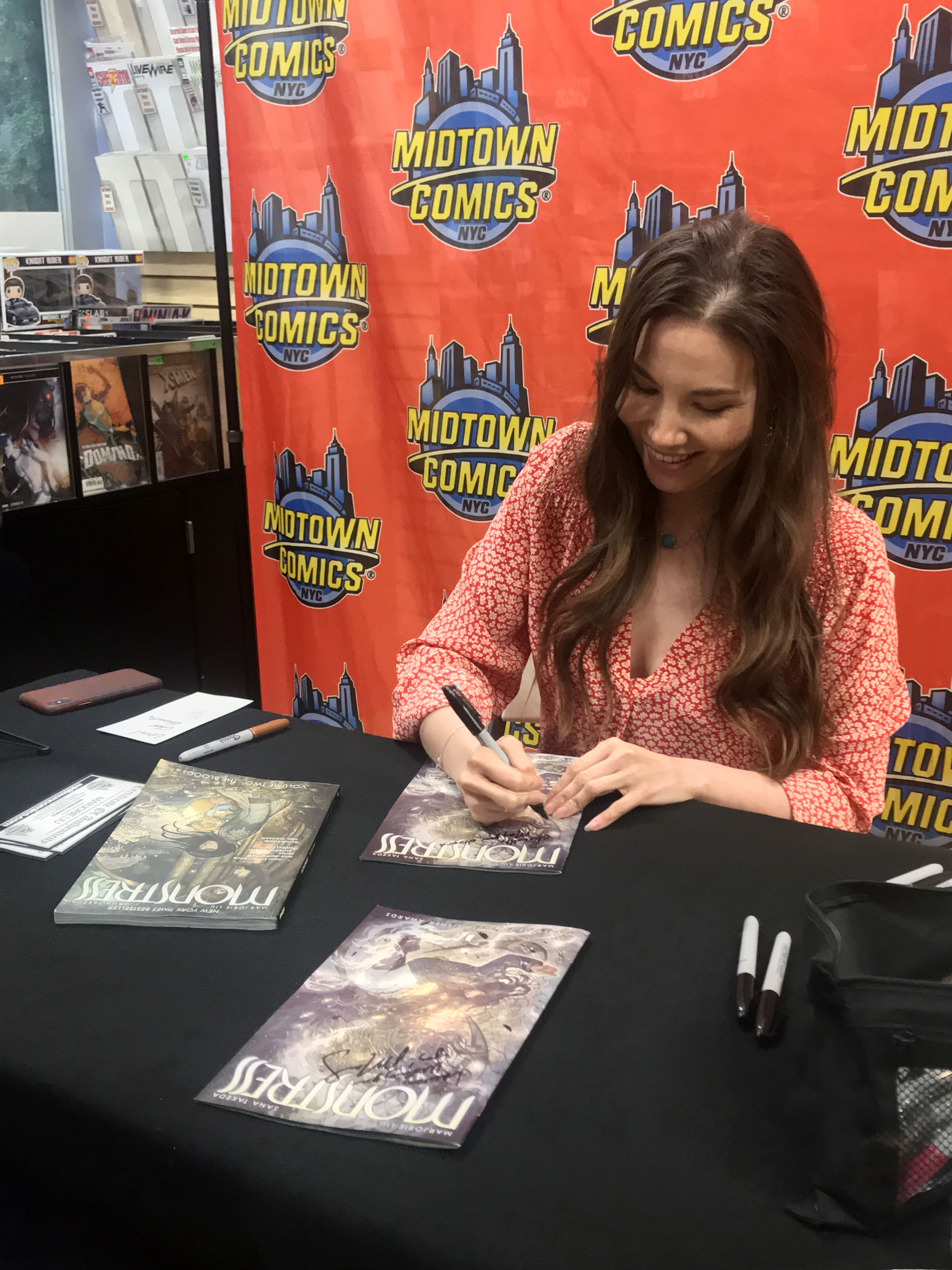
Liu at a 2019 signing for Monstress #24 at Midtown Comics in Manhattan.

Min Hyoung Song with the LA Book Review states that Monstress is a "political narrative" as the violence has intention. Women holding positions of power and influence in society is normalized within the narrative with no explicit statements being made on the matriarchal order within the story, allowing readers to draw their own conclusions to any feminist themes.

Race plays a large role in the series through enslavement. The Arcanics, a race of magical creatures, have been at war with humans for decades, and they are now at a stalemate; however the humans are taking Arcanics and selling them as slaves to other humans. Racial identity is also a crucial theme in Monstress, in its depictions of rebellion Maika takes part in. Derek Lee writes in his research article, "Instead, the comic charts an alternative path focused on progressive protest. What emerges is a bildungsroman in form that refuses to integrate the individual with the polis, resists the dominant racial ideologies of its era, and rejects social stability. Ironically, social justice and revolution are its ultimate goals."

== Reception ==
At the review aggregator website Comic Book Roundup, the series received an average score of 9.0 out of 10 based on 233 critic reviews and an average score of 8.3 from 406 readers.

The first, triple-sized issue of Monstress received critical praise. Writing for Kotaku, Evan Narcisse called it "a gorgeous comic book about racism, war and slavery", noting the intricate detail of Takeda's manga-inspired art. Reviewing the book for The A.V. Club, Caitlin Rosberg described the leading characters, all women, as "deeply flawed and showing layers of nuanced characterization that you don’t often see in comic books", and appreciated the "sense of in-between-ness—(...) neither traditionally Western nor manga, paced like a novel but drawn like a comic". The comic was described by the Los Angeles Review of Books as "ambitious as George R. R. Martin or J. R. R. Tolkien" for its high fantasy concepts and heavy world-building.

=== Awards and nominations ===
Award	Year	Category	Nominee	Result	Ref.
Bram Stoker Award	2018	Best Graphic Novel	Monstress – Volume 2: The Blood	Nominated	
Bram Stoker Award	2019	Best Graphic Novel	Monstress – Volume 3: Haven	Nominated	
Bram Stoker Award	2020	Best Graphic Novel	Monstress – Volume 4: The Chosen	Nominated	
British Fantasy Award	2017	Best Comic / Graphic Novel	Monstress – Volume 1: Awakening	Won	
British Fantasy Award	2018	Best Comic / Graphic Novel	Monstress – Volume 2: The Blood	Won	
British Fantasy Award	2018	Best Artist	Sana Takeda	Nominated	
Eisner Awards	2016	Best Writer	Marjorie Liu	Nominated	
Eisner Awards	2016	Best New Series	Monstress	Nominated	
Eisner Awards	2017	Best Publication for Teens	Monstress	Nominated	
Eisner Awards	2017	Best Painter/Multimedia Artist (interior art)	Sana Takeda	Nominated	
Eisner Awards	2017	Best Cover Artist	Sana Takeda	Nominated	
Eisner Awards	2018	Best Continuing Series	Monstress	Won	
Eisner Awards	2018	Best Publication for Teens	Monstress	Won	
Eisner Awards	2018	Best Writer	Marjorie Liu	Won	
Eisner Awards	2018	Best Painter/Multimedia Artist (interior art)	Sana Takeda	Won	
Eisner Awards	2018	Best Cover Artist	Sana Takeda	Won	
Eisner Awards	2022	Best Painter/Multimedia Artist (interior art)	Sana Takeda	Won	
Eisner Awards	2023	Best Painter/Multimedia Artist (interior art)	Sana Takeda	Won	
Harvey Awards	2018	Book of the Year Award	Monstress	Won	
Hugo Awards	2017	Best Graphic Story	Monstress – Volume 1: Awakening	Won	
Hugo Awards	2017	Best Professional Artist	Sana Takeda	Nominated	
Hugo Awards	2018	Best Graphic Story	Monstress – Volume 2: The Blood	Won	
Hugo Awards	2018	Best Professional Artist	Sana Takeda	Won	
Hugo Awards	2019	Best Graphic Story	Monstress – Volume 3: Haven	Won	
Hugo Awards	2020	Best Graphic Story	Monstress – Volume 4: The Chosen	Nominated	
Hugo Awards	2021	Best Graphic Story	Monstress – Volume 5: Warchild	Nominated	
Hugo Awards	2022	Best Graphic Story	Monstress – Volume 6: The Vow	Nominated	
Hugo Awards	2023	Best Graphic Story	Monstress – Volume 7: Devourer	Nominated	
Hugo Awards	2025	Best Graphic Story	Monstress – Volume 9: The Possessed	Nominated	
World Fantasy Awards	2022	Special Award, Professional	Monstress – Volume 6: The Vow	Won	

== Collected editions ==
Title	Material collected	Publication date	Format	ISBN
Monstress – Volume 1: Awakening	Monstress #1–6	July 19, 2016	Trade paperback	9781632157096
Monstress – Volume 2: The Blood	Monstress #7–12	July 5, 2017	Trade paperback	9781534300415
Monstress – Volume 3: Haven	Monstress #13–18	September 5, 2018	Trade paperback	9781534306912
Monstress – Volume 4: The Chosen	Monstress #19–24	September 25, 2019	Trade paperback	9781534313361
Monstress – Volume 5: Warchild	Monstress #25–30	October 6, 2020	Trade paperback	9781534316614
Monstress – Volume 6: The Vow	Monstress: Talk-Stories #1–2; Monstress #31–35	September 8, 2021	Trade paperback	9781534319158
Monstress – Volume 7: Devourer	Monstress #36–41	September 7, 2022	Trade paperback	9781534323193
Monstress – Volume 8: Inferno	Monstress #42–48	November 22, 2023	Trade paperback	9781534399525
Monstress – Volume 9: The Possessed	Monstress #49–54	November 13, 2024	Trade paperback	9781534392618
Monstress – Volume 10: Hollow Gods	Monstress #55–60	December 2, 2025	Trade paperback	9781534332690
Monstress – Book One	Monstress #1–18	July 3, 2019	Hardcover	9781534312326
Monstress – Book Two	Monstress #19–35; Monstress: Talk-Stories #1–2	December 7, 2022	Hardcover	9781534323148
Monstress – Book Three	Monstress #36–54	August 5, 2025	Hardcover	9781534335240
Monstress – Compendium One: Enter the Halfwolf	Monstress #1–48; Monstress: Talk-Stories #1–2	October 7, 2025	Trade paperback compendium	9781534328334
