= Sam Weller (journalist) =

American journalist and author

- Born: Lake Forest, Illinois
- Occupations: Author, journalist, lecturer
- Writing career
- Genres: Biography, journalism, essays, fiction, arts criticism
- Website: www.samweller.net

Sam Weller is an American journalist and author, best known as writer Ray Bradbury's authorized biographer.

== Early life and education ==
Weller was born in Lake Forest, Illinois. He was raised in Malibu, California and in Long Lake Minnesota.

== Career ==
Weller's 2005 book, The Bradbury Chronicles: The Life of Ray Bradbury was a Los Angeles Times best-seller, winner of the 2005 Society of Midland Authors Award for Best Biography, and a Bram Stoker Award nominee. Weller's 2010 book, Listen to the Echoes, The Ray Bradbury Interviews is a collection of interviews, photos, mementos, and artifacts and a companion book to The Bradbury Chronicles. It was also a Bram Stoker Award nominee. Listen to the Echoes, The Ray Bradbury Interviews was rereleased in 2017 by Hat & Beard Press and included color photographs and new editorial content, including an afterword by author Margaret Atwood. With Mort Castle, Weller co-edited the anthology Shadow Show: All-New Stories in Celebration of Ray Bradbury. The anthology was a Shirley Jackson Award nominee.

In 2014, Weller edited Ray Bradbury: The Last Interview (Melville House), which features Weller's last interview with Bradbury, and recounts Bradbury's influences, creative processes, and love for writing and reading. The book also included several previously unpublished rough draft essays by Bradbury, dictated to Weller. Also in 2014, IDW Comics released a five-issue Shadow Show comic book series curated and largely scripted by Weller and Mort Castle. The graphic novel compendium of this series was the recipient of the Bram Stoker Award for Best Graphic Novel in 2015.

In September 2020, Weller's collection of short stories, Dark Black, was published by Hat & Beard Press. Newcity said: "With this collection, Weller is making an argument that he's more than Bradbury's chronicler. Weller is arguing he's Bradbury's literary heir. By sheer story quality alone, Weller makes a good damn argument."

Weller's short fiction has appeared in books, literary journals and magazines, including the Chicago Reader, Printers Row Journal, and Rosebud. His pop-cultural essays have appeared in publications including Post Road, Huffington Post Annalemma, and PopMatters. In 2025, Weller's story "Creepy Crawly" was published in the anthology Costs of Living (Whisper House Press) and was mentioned in a review of the anthology published in Kirkus Reviews.

Weller is the former Midwest correspondent for Publishers Weekly magazine. He has written for The Paris Review, Playboy, All Things Considered, Slate Magazine, The Huffington Post, National Public Radio, LitHub, and The Los Angeles Review of Books. Weller has written a series of scholarly essays about author Ray Bradbury and his writing.

Weller was a professor at Columbia College Chicago in its English Department from 2005 to 2022. On July 8, 2022, the college terminated him for violating its sexual harassment policies after investigating allegations by a faculty colleague.

Weller announced on a live webcast through the Philadelphia Public Library in December 2025 that he was working on a new book of critical essays on the life, legacy and writings of Ray Bradbury.

== Bibliography ==
- Secret Chicago: The Unique Guidebook to Chicago's Hidden Sites, Sounds & Tastes (2000)
- The Bradbury Chronicles: The Life of Ray Bradbury (2005)
- Listen to the Echoes: The Ray Bradbury Interviews (2010)
- Shadow Show: All New Stories in Celebration of Ray Bradbury (2012, editor with Mort Castle)
- Ray Bradbury: The Last Interview: And Other Conversations (2014)
- "Shadow Show: Stories in Celebration of Ray Bradbury" Graphic Novel (2015)
- Dark Black (2020)
