= Sami Kivelä =

Finnish comic book artist

- Born: 1979 (age 46–47)
- Known for: Comic book artist
- Notable work: Machine Gun Wizards
- Website: Sami Kivelä’s blog

Sami Kivelä (born 1979) is a Finnish comic book artist. He is best known for titles such as Undone by Blood (AfterShock Comics), Abbott (Boom! Studios) and Machine Gun Wizards (Dark Horse Comics).

Kivelä has also illustrated several comic books for Zenescope Entertainment, including Hit List and the Realm War: Age of Darkness series, which is a part of the Grimm Fairy Tales Universe. His other work includes Beautiful Canvas (Black Mask Studios), Chum (ComixTribe), Deer Editor (Kickstarter-funded and published by Mad Cave Studios), Dark Lies, Darker Truths (Markosia), The Heap (Moonstone Books), Zeroids (Moonstone Books) and Lordi comics (Arktinen Banaani).

Furthermore, he has been published by Ape Entertainment, Egmont, Otava, Heske Horror etc. Kivelä has also self-published a number of comics.

In the past, Kivelä has designed and illustrated CD and DVD covers.
