= Marjorie Liu =

American writer

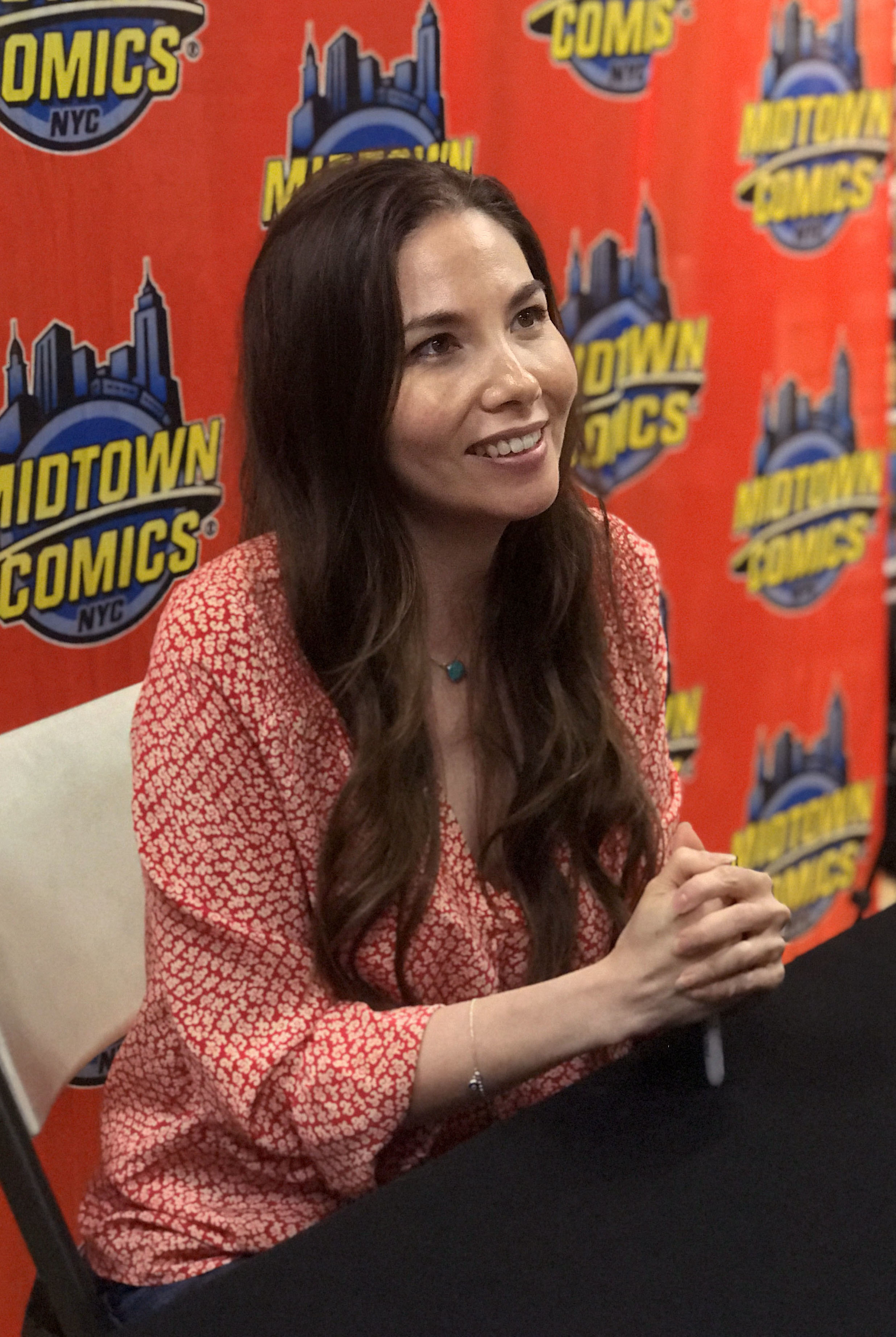
- Liu in 2019 at Midtown Comics in Manhattan
- Born: Philadelphia, Pennsylvania, U.S.
- Education: Lawrence University (BA); University of Wisconsin–Madison (JD)
- Occupations: Novelist; poet; comic book writer; lawyer
- Writing career
- Language: English, Chinese
- Period: 2007–present
- Genres: Adventure, urban fantasy, romance, superhero fantasy
- Notable works: Monstress; Tiger Eye; NYX; X-23; Dark Wolverine
- Website: marjoriemliu.com

Marjorie M. Liu is an American New York Times best-selling author and comic book writer. She is acclaimed for her horror fantasy comic Monstress, and her paranormal romance and urban fantasy novels including The Hunter Kiss and Tiger Eye series. Her work for Marvel Comics includes NYX, X-23, Dark Wolverine, and Astonishing X-Men. In 2015 Image Comics debuted her creator-owned series Monstress, for which she was nominated for an Eisner Award for Best New Series. In 2017 she won a Hugo Award for the first Monstress trade paperback collection. In July 2018 she became the first woman in the 30-year history of the Eisner Awards to win the Eisner Award for Best Writer for her work on Monstress.

== Early life ==
Liu was born in Philadelphia, and grew up in Seattle, Washington. Her father is Taiwanese, while her mother is an American of French, Scottish and Irish descent. She developed an early love of reading, from books such as Laura Ingalls Wilder's Little House on the Prairie books, and the works of Robert Louis Stevenson, Joseph Campbell, Charles de Lint and Jorge Luis Borges.

Liu graduated from Lawrence University with a bachelor's degree in East Asian studies and biomedical ethics in 2000. As an undergraduate, she designed a fan site called The Wolverine and Jubilee page, after her discovery of numerous X-Men fan sites that she admired. Although she had never read comic books as a child, she was familiar with the X-Men through the animated TV series and via fan fiction. She first purchased X-Men and Wolverine comics for reference for her fanfic from Powerhouse Comics in Appleton, Wisconsin. Writing fanfic helped her improve her storytelling skills.

After graduating, she attended the University of Wisconsin Law School. As a law student, she interned in Beijing working at the Foreign Agriculture Service at the U.S. Embassy, which at the time, was dealing with the Chinese government's new rules regarding the import of genetically modified food. She graduated in May 2003, and was soon admitted to the bar.

== Career ==
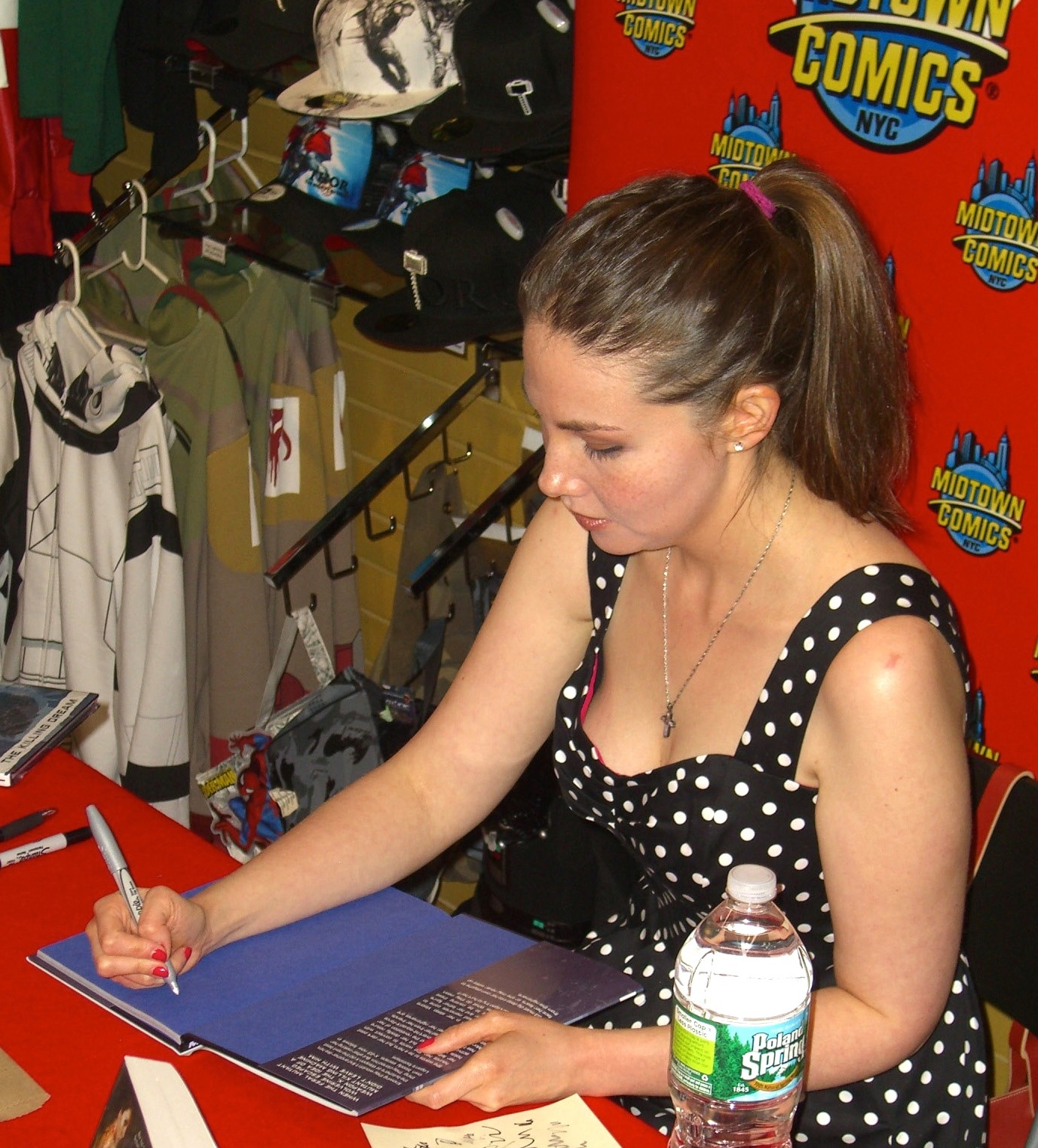
Liu at a 2011 book signing at Midtown Comics Times Square in Manhattan

Despite enjoying law school, Liu was disillusioned with the life of a lawyer. Instead she decided to become a writer. She published poetry, short stories, and non-fiction pieces, then submitted her first novel, a paranormal romantic adventure set in China and the United States entitled Tiger Eye. She wrote it in one month. She submitted it to several publishers before it was acquired by Dorchester, and published in November 2007. She wrote a sequel to Tiger Eye, then produced A Taste of Crimson, the sequel to Liz Maverick's Crimson City, which was published in August 2005.

After seeing a little boy dressed as Spider-Man at a book convention in Tucson, Arizona, Liu told her former literary agent Lucienne Diver that she would enjoy writing for Marvel Comics. Diver, who knew a Marvel acquisition editor seeking authors for Marvel tie-in novels at Pocket Books, made inquiries. Pocket had already hired enough authors for the Spider-Man books, but they had not hired anyone to write tie-in novels for the X-Men.

Liu produced the X-Men novel Dark Mirror for Pocket in 2005, but it was three years before that she landed her first comics assignment at Marvel, the X-Men spin-off NYX. She served as co-writer on Marvel's Daken: Dark Wolverine with Daniel Way, and wrote the X-23 series, which ended with #21.

Liu wrote the final 21 issues for Marvel's Astonishing X-Men series with artist Mike Perkins from 2012 to 2013. The series received media attention for featuring Marvel Comics' first gay wedding between Northstar and longterm partner Kyle in issue #51 (August 2012). According to Marvel Comics editor-in-chief Axel Alonso, the issue comes as a response to real-world legalization of same sex marriage in New York. Liu was nominated for a GLAAD Media Award in 2013.

In 2015, Liu taught a course at MIT on comic book writing and participated at the VONA/VOICES Workshop as guest lecturer at UC Berkeley for popular fiction.

In 2015 Image Comics debuted Liu's comics series, Monstress, which gained wide publicity for its exploration of racism, the effects of war, and feminism.

In July 2018 Liu became the first woman in the 30-year history of the Eisner Awards to win the Eisner Award for Best Writer for her work on Monstress. She shared the award with writer Tom King, who received it for his work on Batman books and Mister Miracle.

== Personal life ==
As of December 2012, Liu had been in a relationship with author Junot Díaz and living with him in Cambridge, Massachusetts.

== Writings ==
=== Novels ===
==== Dirk & Steele series ====
#	Title	Also In	Publication Date	Comments
1	Tiger Eye		2005	
2	Shadow Touch		2006	
3	The Red Heart of Jade		2006	
3.5	A Dream of Stone and Shadows	Dark Dreamers	Sep 2006	NYT Best Seller
4	Eye of Heaven		2006	
5	Soul Song		2007	
6	The Last Twilight		2008	
7	The Wild Road		2008	
8	The Fire King		2009	
9	In the Dark of Dreams		2010	
10	Within the Flames		2011	
11	Where the Heart Lives		Aug 2012	

==== Hunter Kiss ====
#	Title	Also In	Publication Date
1	The Iron Hunt		2008
2	Darkness Calls		2008
2.5	Hunter Kiss	Wild Thing	May 2007
2.6	Armor of Roses	Inked Armor of Roses and the Silver Voice	Jan 2010
3	A Wild Light		Jul 2010
3.5	The Silver Voice	Armor of Roses and the Silver Voice'	Dec 2011
4	The Mortal Bone		2011
5	Labyrinth of Stars		2014

===== Other novels =====
- A Taste of Crimson: Crimson City, Book 2 (2005)
- X-Men: Dark Mirror (2005)

==== Short fiction ====
Anthology or Collection	Contents	Publication Date
Dark Dreamers	"A Dream of Stone and Shadows" (Dirk & Steele noella)	Sep 2006
Holidays are Hell	"Six"	Jan 2007
Wild Thing	"Hunter Kiss"	May 2007
My Big Fat Supernatural Honeymoon	"Where the Heart Lives"	Dec 2007
Hotter than Hell (edited by Martin H. Greenberg and Kim Harrison)	"Minotaur in Stone"	Jun 2008
Huntress	The Robber Bride	Jun 2009
Never After	"The Tangleroot Palace"	Nov 2009
Inked	"Armor of Roses"	Jan 2010
Masked (edited by Lou Anders)	"Call Her Savage" (a.k.a. "The Light and the Fury")	Jul 2010
Songs of Love and Death (edited by Gardner Dozois and George R. R. Martin)	"After the Blood"	Nov 2010
Armor of Roses and The Silver Voice	"Armor of Roses" The Silver Voice	Dec 2011
An Apple for the Creature (edited by Charlaine Harris and Toni Kelner)	Sympathy for the Bones	Sep 2012
The Mad Scientist's Guide to World Domination (edited by John Joseph Adams)	"The Last Dignity of Man"	Feb 2013
The Starlit Wood (edited by Dominick Perisen and Navah Wolfe)	"Briar and Rose"	Oct 2016

=== Comics ===
- NYX: No Way Home #1 - 6 (Marvel Comics, 2008–2009)
- Dark Wolverine #75 - 90 (co-written with Daniel Way, Marvel Comics, 2009–2010)
- X-23 Vol. 2 #1- Women of Marvel one-shot (Marvel Comics, 2010)
- Black Widow Vol. 4 #1 - 5 (Marvel Comics, 2010)
- Girl Comics #3 (Wolverine & Jubilee story only, Marvel Comics, 2010)
- Wolverine: Road to Hell - one-shot (Marvel Comics, 2010)
- Daken: Dark Wolverine #1 - 9 (co-written with Daniel Way, Marvel Comics, 2010–2011) (continuation of Dark Wolverine)
- X-23 Vol. 3 #1 - 21 (Marvel Comics, 2010–2012)
- Jim Henson's Storyteller ("Puss in Boots", Archaia, 2013)
- Astonishing X-Men Vol. 3 #48 - #68, (Marvel Comics, 2012–2013)
- X-Termination #1 (Marvel Comics, 2013)
- X-Treme X-Men Vol. 2 #13 (Marvel Comics, 2013)
- Legends of Red Sonja #4 (Dynamite, 2014)
- Monstress (Image Comics, 2015-present)
- Star Wars: Han Solo (Marvel Comics, 2016)
- The Night Eaters (Abrams, 2022-2025)

=== Nonfiction ===
- "Ghost" in The Secret Lives of Geek Girls (2015) edited by Hope Nicholson

== Awards and nominations ==
Year	Work	Award Name	Category	Result	Ref
2005	A Taste of Crimson	PEARL Award	Best Futuristic	Won	
2005	n/a	PEARL Award	Best New Author	Won	
2005	Tiger Eye	Romantic Times Reviewers' Choice Award	Best Contemporary Paranormal Romance	Won	
2008	The Last Twilight	Romantic Times Reviewers' Choice Award	Best Shapeshifter Romance	Nominated	
2008	The Iron Hunt	Romantic Times Reviewers' Choice Award	Best Urban Fantasy	Nominated	
2011	The Mortal Bone	Romantic Times Reviewers' Choice Nominee	Paranormal Romance	Nominated	
2011	Within the Flames	Romantic Times Book of the Year	Editor's Choice	Nominated	
2012	The Mortal Bone	Romantic Times Reviewers' Choice Award	Urban Fantasy Worldbuilding	Won	
2013	Astonishing X-Men	GLAAD Media Award	Outstanding Comic Book	Nominated	
2016	Monstress	Eisner Awards	Best Writer	Nominated	
2017	Han Solo	Eisner Awards	Best Limited Series	Nominated	
2017	Monstress	Eisner Awards	Best Publication for Teens	Nominated	
2017	Monstress, Volume 1: Awakening	Hugo Award	Best Graphic Story	Won	
2018	Monstress, Volume 2: The Blood	Hugo Award	Best Graphic Story	Won	
2018	Monstress	Eisner Awards	Best Writer	Won (Note: Tied with Tom King)	
2019	Monstress, Volume 3: Haven	Bram Stoker Award	Best Graphic Novel	Nominated	
2019	Monstress, Volume 3: Haven	Hugo Award	Best Graphic Story	Won	
2019	Monstress, Volume 4: The Chosen	Bram Stoker Award	Best Graphic Novel	Nominated	
2020	Monstress, Volume 4: The Chosen	Hugo Award	Best Graphic Story	Nominated	
2022	Monstress, Volume 6: The Vow	Hugo Award	Best Graphic Story	Nominated	
2023	Monstress, Volume 7: Devourer	Hugo Award	Best Graphic Story	Nominated	
