= DexCon =

DEXCON
- Status: Defunct
- Genre: board games, roleplaying games, video games
- Locations: Morristown, New Jersey
- Country: United States
- Inaugurated: 1992
- Attendance: over 2200
- Organizer: Double Exposure, Inc.
- Website: http://www.dexposure.com/home.html

DEXCON is a five-day gaming convention, held annually every July in Morristown, New Jersey, run by Double Exposure, Inc. It includes a number of different departments hosting multiple types of gaming, including board gaming, Larping, video gaming, and wargaming. It also hosts a number of special events and new game releases.

DEXCONs 1 through 6 were held yearly from 1992 to 1997. After a seven-year hiatus, the convention returned to an annual schedule in 2004.

Event	Date	Location
DEXCON 1	1992	
DEXCON 2	1993	
DEXCON 3	1994	
DEXCON 4	July 16–20, 1995	Somerset, NJ
DEXCON 5	July 10–14, 1996	Somerset, NJ
DEXCON 6	July 2–6, 1997	Rutherford, NJ
	Seven Year Hiatus	
DEXCON 7	July 14–18, 2004	East Brunswick, NJ
DEXCON 8	July 13–17, 2005	East Brunswick, NJ
DEXCON 9	July 12–16, 2006	East Brunswick, NJ
DEXCON 10	July 18–22, 2007	East Brunswick, NJ
DEXCON 11	July 16–20, 2008	East Brunswick, NJ
DEXCON 12	July 8–12, 2009	Morristown, NJ
DEXCON 13	July 7–11, 2010	Morristown, NJ
DEXCON 14	July 6–10, 2011	Morristown, NJ
DEXCON 15	July 4–8, 2012	Morristown, NJ
DEXCON 16	July 3–7, 2013	Morristown, NJ
DEXCON 17	July 2–6, 2014	Morristown, NJ
DEXCON 18	July 1–5, 2015	Morristown, NJ
DEXCON 19	June 29-July 3, 2016	Morristown, NJ
DEXCON 20	July 5–9, 2017	Morristown, NJ
DEXCON 21	July 4–8, 2018	Morristown, NJ
DEXCON 22	July 3–7, 2019	Morristown, NJ
