= Mort Castle =

American novelist

- Born: 1946 (age 79–80)
- Occupations: Novelist; short story writer; comic book writer
- Writing career
- Period: 1967–present
- Genres: Horror, drama, gothic, genre fiction
- Notable works: Cursed Be the Child; The Strangers
- Website: www.mortwrites.freeservers.com

Mort Castle (born 1946) is an American author of horror fiction, and has more 17 books and 500 short stories to his credit, including Cursed Be the Child (Leisure Books, 1994) and The Strangers (1984). Castle began publishing short stories in 1967, with his debut novel The Deadly Election (1976). He has had pieces published in all sorts of places ranging from traditional literary magazines to more off-the-wall or risqué markets. He has been nominated eleven times for the Bram Stoker Award for Short Fiction and was winner three times.

A dedicated writing teacher, Castle has been a working musician, a standup comic, a stage hypnotist, a high school English teacher, and a magazine and comic book editor. He was a writer-in-residence for two high schools, and taught "Researching and Writing Historical Fiction" and "Story In Graphic Form" and other classes at Columbia College Chicago.

He is a frequent keynote speaker at writing conferences, and has given over 1000 presentations to writers, would-be writers, and teachers of writing.

He edited the book Writing Horror, first published in 1997, which has become a "bible" for aspiring horror authors and includes interviews with some of horror's top authors.

Mort Castle is also the Executive Editor of Thorby Comics, and currently fiction editor for Doorways Magazine.

Mort Castle has been a regular contributor to Eureka Productions' Graphic Classics series since 2006, with work in Graphic Classics: Jack London, (second edition), Graphic Classics: Ambrose Bierce (second edition), Graphic Classics: Bram Stoker (second edition), Graphic Classics: Robert Louis Stevenson (second edition), Graphic Classics: O. Henry, and Graphic Classics: Halloween Classics.

In August 2013, it was announced that Mort Castle will be scripting the Red Giant Entertainment comic book Darchon, an ongoing feature of their Giant-Size Comics series of free print comic book titles set to debut on May 3, 2014, as part of Free Comic Book Day. Darchon will appear monthly in Giant-Size Thrills, their horror-focused title.

Mort Castle's short story, Oval Portrait, was published in 3Elements Literary Review's fall issue no. 8, in October 2015.

== Awards ==
Castle has been nominated for various awards, including the Pushcart Prize, the Bram Stoker Award (which he won three times), the DeMarco Prize, and the Emerson Fiction Award, Leaders in the Arts for Chicago. He was presented the 2023 Bram Stoker Award for Lifetime Achievement.

== Bibliography ==
=== Novels ===
- In Memoriam: Papa, Blake and HPL
- The Deadly Election (1976)
- The Strangers (1984)
- Cursed Be the Child (1990)

=== Collections ===
- So Many Tomorrows: Three Stories About Children
- Moon on the Water (2000)
- Nations of the Living, Nations of the Dead (2002)
- New Moon on the Water (announced by the now defunct Full Moon Press for 2010, currently being published by DarK Regions Press)
- Knowing When to Die (2018)

=== Anthologies edited ===
- Nukes: Four Horror Writers on the Ultimate Horror : Stories (1986)
- Shadow Show: All-New Stories in Celebration of Ray Bradbury with Sam Weller (2012)
- "All American Horror of the 21st Century"

=== Short Fiction ===
- "Teachers" from the anthology Miskatonic University edited by Martin H. Greenberg and Robert Weinberg (1996)

=== Non-fiction ===
- Writing Horror: A Handbook by the Horror Writers Association (1997)
- "Writer's Digest Annotated Classics: Dracula"

== See also ==
- List of horror fiction authors
