= Heliosphere (science fiction convention) =

- Status: active
- Genre: Science fiction, Fantasy
- Locations: Tarrytown, New York, Piscataway, New Jersey
- Country: United States
- Inaugurated: 2017
- Organizer: New Amsterdam Science Fiction and Fantasy Fandom, Inc
- Filing status: 501(c)3
- Website: www.heliosphereny.org

HELIOsphere was an annual science fiction and fantasy convention organized by the New Amsterdam Science Fiction and Fantasy Fandom, Inc. first held in March, 2017. It was initially held in Tarrytown, New York, moving to Piscataway, NJ for 2023 and 2024. The 2025 convention was cancelled; the organizers “fully expect[ed] to return in 2026” in January 2025, but by June 2026 the convention had not occurred and the committee had made no announcements.

The programming is a typical fan convention, including panel discussions on writing, science, fantasy, gaming, and craft workshops, a games room, and a dance event.

== HELIOsphere 2017 ==
The HELIOsphere 2017 Guests of Honor were writers Jacqueline Carey, David Gerrold, and Danielle Ackley McPhail.

Special Guests were author Dr. Charles E. Gannon, and artist Heidi Hooper.

It was held at the DoubleTree Hotel in Tarrytown, New York on the weekend of March 10–12, 2017

Notable Guests and Panelists

- Alex Shvartsman science fiction and fantasy writer and editor, and former professional American Magic: The Gathering player
- Paul Levinson a writer and professor of communications and media studies at Fordham
- Keith DeCandido science fiction, fantasy, and comic book writer
- Laura Antoniou a writer and editor known for her work in erotic fiction

== HELIOsphere 2018 ==
HELIOsphere 2018 took place at the DoubleTree Hotel in Tarrytown, New York March 9–11, 2018.

Guests of Honor were Eric Flint, Charles Gannon, Cecilia Tan, and Mark Oshiro. The featured artist was Tom Kidd.

== HELIOsphere 2019 ==
HELIOsphere 2019 took place April 5–7, 2019 at the DoubleTree by Hilton hotel in Tarrytown, New York.

Guests of honor were Charlie Jane Anders, Laura Antoniou, and Tom Smith, with featured artist Alan F. Beck.
