= Wyrmspan =

2024 board game

- Designers: Connie Vogelmann
- Illustrators: Clémentine Campardou
- Publishers: Stonemaier Games
- Publication: 2024
- Players: 1-5
- Playing time: 90 minutes
- Website: www.stonemaiergames.com

Wyrmspan is a board game for one to five players designed by Connie Vogelmann and published by Stonemaier Games in 2024. It is a card-driven, engine-building board game in which players compete to excavate labyrinths and entice dragons to the sanctuary of their caves. Based on the acclaimed board game Wingspan, Wyrmspan is themed around dragons instead of birds and hosts slightly more complex game mechanics. Upon its release Wyrmspan received widespread positive reviews and achieved the largest single-day product sale quantity in Stonemaier Games history.

== Gameplay ==
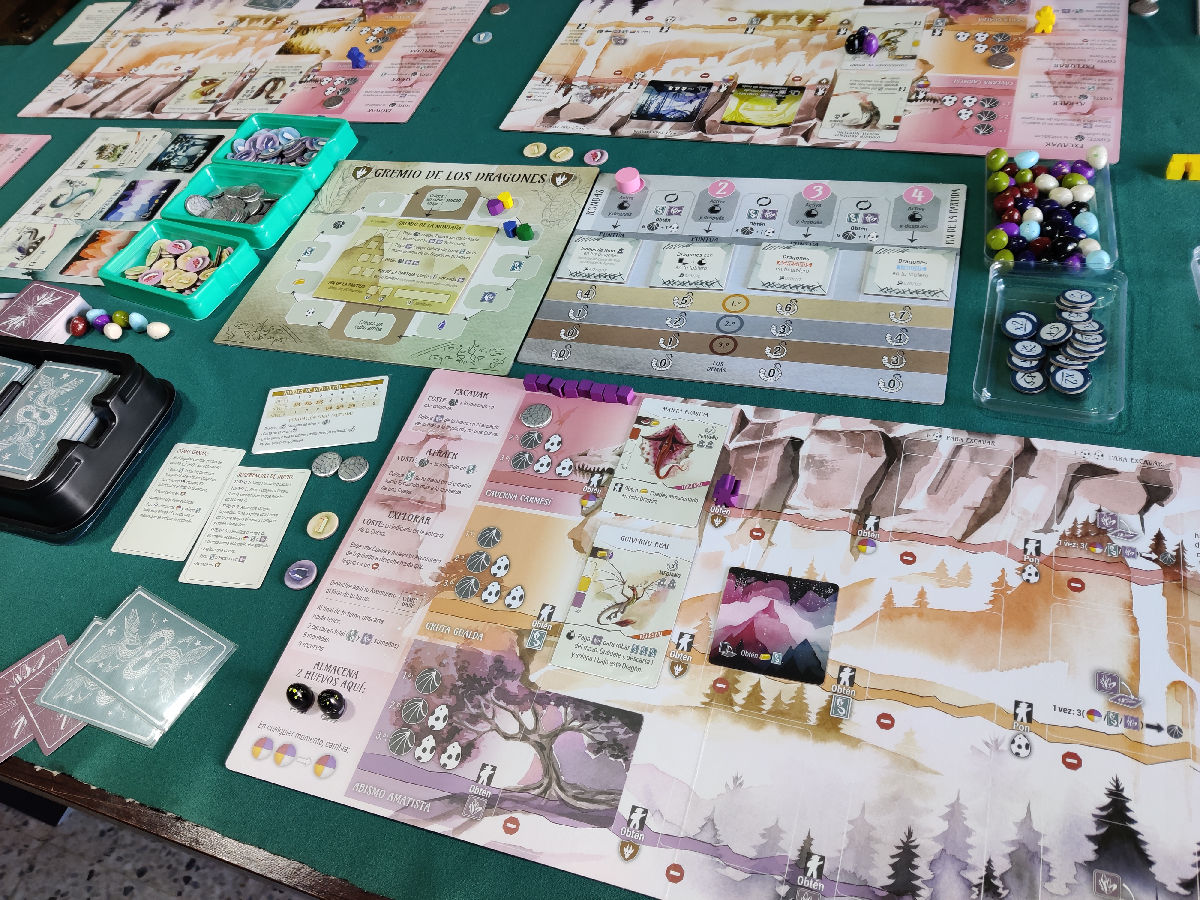
Playing

In Wyrmspan players excavate caves and entice dragons, represented by 183 uniquely illustrated cards, before using their adventurer to explore for resources and victory points. Inspired by Wingspan, Wyrmspan is a card-driven, engine-building game that increases the complexity of Wingspan. On their turn, players can take one of three actions. They can excavate by playing cave cards in the Crimson Cavern, Golden Grotto or Amethyst Abyss in the leftmost available space, each triggering a when-played ability. They may also entice a dragon, but only on spaces where a cave has already been played, placing the dragon on top of the cave card. The first column in each of the three rows starts already excavated. Players can also explore by sending their adventurer to one of the three caves and receiving resources, collecting what is printed on the mat and from any dragons with an adventurer icon until they reach a stop sign. The more dragons that are played, the better the explore action will be. Besides when-activated powers represented by the adventurer icon, other dragon power types include when-played, once-per-round, and end-game. Each of the three action options will use an action coin and the adventure action will also cost eggs if you explore each cave more than once. Throughout the game players will also be working towards public objectives at the end of each round and advancement on the guild track, which will give players rewards as they gain more esteem.

At the end of the game players score points for the dragon cards on their board, the dragon guild, end game abilities on dragons, public objectives, accumulated eggs, cached resources, tucked cards, and remaining coins and items in certain combinations. The player with the most points wins.

== Development ==
Wyrmspan was designed by Connie Vogelmann, an attorney in Washington, DC, who released her first board game Apiary in 2023. The game is a spiritual successor to Wingspan, a hugely successful board game by Elizabeth Hargrave, who worked as a developer for Wyrmspan. Unlike Wingspan, whose theme revolves around birds, Wyrmspan’s theme is dragons, as proposed by Jamey Stegmaier. This is a theme that both Vogelmann and Clémentine Campardou, the artist for Wyrmspan, researched heavily to create diverse dragons and cohesive categorizations. Jamey Stegmaier, president of Stonemaier Games, recruited Connie to design Wyrmspan after seeing a market for it and receiving fan requests for other creature themes. Stonemaier games is a company based in St. Louis which previously published Scythe, Apiary, and Wingspan.

While working on Wyrmspan Connie Vogelmann described her first change from Wingspan as the addition of cave cards and excavating spaces for the dragons to live in, which felt very thematic. The team wanted Wyrmspan to retain the engine building and friendly feeling of Wingspan while upping the complexity slightly. This also included the addition of hatchlings, which activate in three steps unlike normal dragon cards and have big payoffs. Some mechanics that Vogelmann tested but didn’t use in Wyrmspan include bag building and market mechanics for drafting resources, but a mechanic that did get added to the final game, the Guild Track, was actually added to fix a resource problem that turned into a “happy accident."

=== Accessibility ===
Stonemaier Games has begun working towards making their board games more accessible, as seen in some of the additional purchase options for Wingspan like vision-friendly cards, and this effort carried over into the design of Wyrmspan. This work includes increasing accessibility for colorblind and low-vision players, which they have done in several ways including hiring freelance proofreaders and an accessibility reviewer. Some of the accessibility features in Wyrmspan include large font sizes, no flavor text or visual noise, double-coded attributes through both text and color, and positional double-coding.

== Awards and nominations ==
Year	Game	Award	Category	Result
2024	Wyrmspan	Guldbrikken	Best Adult Game	Nominated
2024	Wyrmspan	Golden Geek Award	Medium Game of the Year	Nominated
2024	Wyrmspan	Golden Geek Award	Best Board Game Artwork & Presentation	Nominated

== Reception ==
=== Critical reviews ===
Wyrmspan received widespread positive reviews upon release, with many noting that the mechanics are a step up from Wingspan. Dicetower stated that the guild mat and resource gathering were an excellent addition, and that removing the dice tower from the game was one of the best possible choices that could have been made. Mechanically, they said, Wyrmspan is "if not at least as good, better than Wingspan." However, they were not huge fans of the theme and aesthetic, noting that they did not like how the art looked in practice and that the Dragon information book was unnecessary fluff. 3 Minute Board Games said that Wyrmspan is a tight engine building game where you are trying to get as many points and moves as possible, and an all around upgrade to Wingspan. Meeple University listed Wyrmspan in their Top Games in January 2024 list, noting that the pace was completely different, with it being slower to get going but leading to huge combos at the end. They said it was a step up from Wingspan and they appreciate the change to resource gathering.

Rahdo stated in their review that Wyrmspan achieved a "perfect balance" between keeping the heart and joy of Wingspan alive while also creating a game that feels new and unique. They like that it adds an extra element of timing due to the sequence of actions that build off of each other, like needing to excavate to entice, and the addition of drawing two different sets of cards into your hand. They also enjoyed the tension of an exploration action costing more each time you use it so that there is no game breaking engine runs with eggs, and that the game felt less random, especially with the birdfeeder being cut. Before You Play said that they love the diverse art in Wyrmspan but found some minor frustrations with stacking dragon cards on top of cave cards, making the game more fiddly. They also said they enjoyed the harder and tighter play that built off of the base of Wingspan, the easier to get food resources, the removal of the egg spamming problem, and the new dragon guild board. They appreciated that the game felt more flexible and eliminated a lot of sources of frustration found in Wingspan.

=== Sales ===
Wyrmspan was the largest single-day product sale quantity of Stonemaier Games ever as of February 2024, with a little over 16,000 copies sold in the first 24 hours. The game had sold around 300,000 copies worldwide by the end of 2024.

== Expansions ==
Wyrmspan Dragon Academy, the first expansion for Wyrmspan, was published in 2025 and added 80 new dragon cards, 25 new cave cards, Dragon Guild tiles, and objective tiles. This expansion also included new mechanisms and dragon powers, such as new Fledgling dragon types and collecting income when you pass out of a round.
