= Expeditions (board game) =

Board game set in an alternative history version of 1920s Europe

- Designers: Jamey Stegmaier
- Illustrators: Jakub Różalski
- Publishers: Stonemaier Games
- Publication: 2023; 3 years ago
- Players: 1–5
- Playing time: 60–90 minutes
- Age range: 14+

Expeditions is a board game designed by Jamey Stegmaier and published in 2023 by Stonemaier Games. It is a standalone sequel to the 2016 board game Scythe. Set in an alternative history version of 1920s Europe, players explore the lands around a meteor crash site in Siberia and defeat the corruption that has appeared using dieselpunk combat mechs and animal companions in order to gain the most profit by the expedition's end.

== Publishing history ==
Expeditions was announced February 1, 2023, and published in August 2023, with Scythe's designer, Jamey Stegmaier, and illustrator, Jakub Różalski, returning for the project. Różalski credits growing up on Sienkiewicz Street in Poland, the Indiana Jones franchise, and The Thing as influences on the art for Expeditions, describing the project as "escape from the sad and tragic reality" of the Russian invasion of Ukraine.

An expansion, Gears of Corruption was released on July 26, 2024, which added new mechs and characters, and the ability to play with six players.

== Gameplay ==
Expeditions takes place in an alternative history version of 1920s Europe in the relative peace of the Great War's aftermath. Players represent heroes of the Great War on an expedition to Siberia, where a meteor has crashed and corrupted the nearby land with monstrous effects. Each player has a character, an animal companion, and a mech with unique abilities. A grid of upside-down hex tiles is laid out, and they are flipped over as the area is explored, revealing tasks to be accomplished, corruption level, and the resources that can be gathered at that location. On their turn, players can take two of three potential actions (move to a different hex tile, play a card from their hand, and gather the benefit from their current tile) or refresh to perform all three actions on their next turn and regain all played cards and workers.

If a player moves to a face-down location, they draw corruption tokens summing to the tile's corruption level, which must be removed by paying Power and Guile (resources gained from playing cards) in order to progress. Cards played give an instant benefit, an ongoing ability, and an ability if a worker is placed on the card. The quests on quest cards under a player's control can be completed to gain important rewards. There are many possible benefits that can be gained from gathering, including gaining cards or workers, upgrading their mech, melding meteorite cards for a permanent bonus, or gaining glory tokens in various glory categories.

The game ends when a player gains a fourth glory token. Gained corruption and glory tokens can be turned in for money, and the player with the most money at the end of the game is the winner.

== Reception ==
IGN rated Expeditions 8/10, with Samantha Nelson praising the game's replayability, gameplay, and design, and concluding "A worthy successor to Scythe, Expeditions is a complex and highly strategic game with excellent, disturbing art and well designed components". Alex Meehan, writing for Dicebreaker, described the game as "the least interesting direction for the Scythe series to go in", criticizing the game's focus on strategic, rather than narrative, gameplay, lack of unique game elements, and its "monster/parasite/alien themes [which] push the worldbuilding too far into the surreal".
