= Tapestry (disambiguation) =

Tapestry is a form of woven textile art.

Tapestry or tapestries may also refer to:

== Computing ==
- Tapestry (DHT), a distributed hash table protocol first described in 2001
- Apache Tapestry, a Java web application framework adopted by the Apache Software Foundation as a top-level project in 2006
- A holographic storage product by InPhase Technologies in 2008

== Literature and comics ==
- The Tapestry, a fantasy fiction series by Henry H. Neff introduced in 2007
- Tapestry (Wildstorm), a comic book villainess introduced in 1994

== Music ==
- Tapestry (Don McLean album), 1970, or the title track
- Tapestry (Carole King album), 1971, or the title track
- Tapestry Revisited: A Tribute to Carole King, a multi-artist tribute album honoring Carole King, 1995
- Tapestry, an album by Bob Belden, 1997
- Tapestry, an album by Keith Getty, 2002
- "Tapestry", a song by Protest the Hero from the 2011 album Scurrilous
- "Tapestry", a song by Hillsong United from the 2013 album Zion
- "Tapestry", a song by Nightmares on Wax from the 2013 album Feelin' Good

== Radio and television ==
- Tapestry (CBC radio), a Canadian documentary/interview program on spirituality, produced since 1994
- Tapestry (CHFI), a Canadian syndicated FM radio program of the late 1970s and early to mid-1980s with music, commentary, and literary readings
- "Tapestry" (Star Trek: The Next Generation), a 1993 sixth-season episode of Star Trek: The Next Generation

== Other uses ==
- Needlepoint, a form of canvaswork, also called tapestry
- Tapestry (horse), an Irish-breed Thoroughbred racehorse foaled in 2011
- Tapestries (novel), 1995 novel by Wizards of the Coast
- Tapestry, Inc., formerly Coach, Inc, an American multinational luxury fashion company based in New York City, founded in 1941
- Tapestry (board game), a 2019 board game created by Jamey Stegmaier
