= Children of the Sun (role-playing game) =

Science fiction tabletop role-playing game

- Designers: Dan Ross, Joe Carl, Lewis Pollak
- Publishers: Misguided Games
- Publication: 2002
- Genres: Dieselpunk fantasy
- Systems: Token System

Children of the Sun is a dieselpunk tabletop role-playing game created by the now defunct Misguided Games, Inc. in 2002. Set on Krace, an island of giant, supernaturally tough trees, it was part of a generation of dieselpunk settings that appeared beginning in the late 1990s. Most notable about the game was its original Token System, which allowed the player to use a token to determine initiative and to interrupt other character's turns.

== Reviews ==
- Syfy
- Realms of Fantasy
