= Paul Hargrave =

American biochemist (1938–2025)

Paul A. Hargrave
- Born: 1938; Palmyra, New York, U.S.
- Died: February 10, 2025 (aged 86); Gainesville, Florida, U.S.
- Education: Colgate University; University of Minnesota
- Known for: Rhodopsin
- Children: Elizabeth Hargrave
- Scientific career
- Fields: Biochemistry
- Workplaces: California Institute of Technology; Southern Illinois University; University of Florida

Paul Hargrave (1938 – February 10, 2025) was an American biochemist whose laboratory work established key features of the structure of rhodopsin.

== Career ==
In 1970, Hargrave received a PhD from the University of Minnesota, where he studied with protein chemist Finn Wold. After post-doctoral work under William J. Dreyer at the California Institute of Technology, Hargrave joined the faculty at Southern Illinois University in 1973.

In 1983, Hargrave and colleagues in his laboratory published the full amino acid sequence for rhodopsin, a photoreceptor protein, after having previously published partial sequences. The sequencing of rhodopsin was later described as a "monumental step" toward understanding the structure of rhodopsin. At the time, the purification of water-insoluble peptides was a challenge, and the Hargrave lab published several discoveries about how to manage them.

Hargrave came to the University of Florida in 1984 as a Jules and Doris Stein Research to Prevent Blindness Professor and in 1990 was named the Francis N. Bullard Professor and Eminent Scholar of Ophthalmology and Biochemistry at the University of Florida. His work continued to explore the structure of rhodopsin, including developing a topographic model. He also pursued further research into the function of rhodopsin, including its role in visual disease such as retinitis pigmentosa and retinoblastoma.

In 1985, Hargrave chaired and secured funding for the first FASEB Science Research Conference on Biology and Chemistry of Vision, which has become a biennial conference.

== Personal life and death ==
Hargrave was a member of the 50 States Marathon Club, having completed a marathon in every state in the United States.

He was the father of board game designer Elizabeth Hargrave.

Hargrave died from pancreatic cancer on February 10, 2025, at the age of 86.

== Awards ==
In 2000, he received the Friedenwald Award of the Association for Research in Vision and Ophthalmology, which honors "outstanding research in the basic or clinical sciences as applied to ophthalmology."

== Selected works ==
- Hargrave, P. A., K. P. Hofmann, and U. B. Kaupp. Signal Transduction in Photoreceptor Cells: Proceedings of an International Workshop, Held at the Research Centre Jülich, Jülich, Fed. Rep. of Germany, 8–11 August 1990. Berlin: Springer-Verlag, 1992. ISBN 3540537651 OCLC 24794897
- Hargrave, P. A. Photoreceptor Cells. San Diego: Academic Press, 1993. ISBN 9780121852795 OCLC 28740269
