= Jakub Różalski =

Polish painter and illustrator

- Born: 1981 (age 44–45); Koszalin, Poland
- Education: Wyższa Szkoła Sztuki Stosowanej
- Known for: Paintings; illustrations
- Notable work: Scythe
- Style: Fantasy; dieselpunk; steampunk
- Website: jrozalski.com

Jakub Różalski (born 1981), also known as Mr. Werewolf, is a Polish artist. He is best known as the illustrator of the board game Scythe and related paintings, commonly featuring mythical, fantastical beasts, robots and similar concepts. His style combines the classic art style of late 18th and early 19th century paintings with modern fantasy and science fiction concepts.

== Biography ==
Różalski was born in Koszalin, Poland, in 1981. He graduated from the Wyższa Szkoła Sztuki Stosowanej in Poznań, and resides in Kraków.

== Works ==
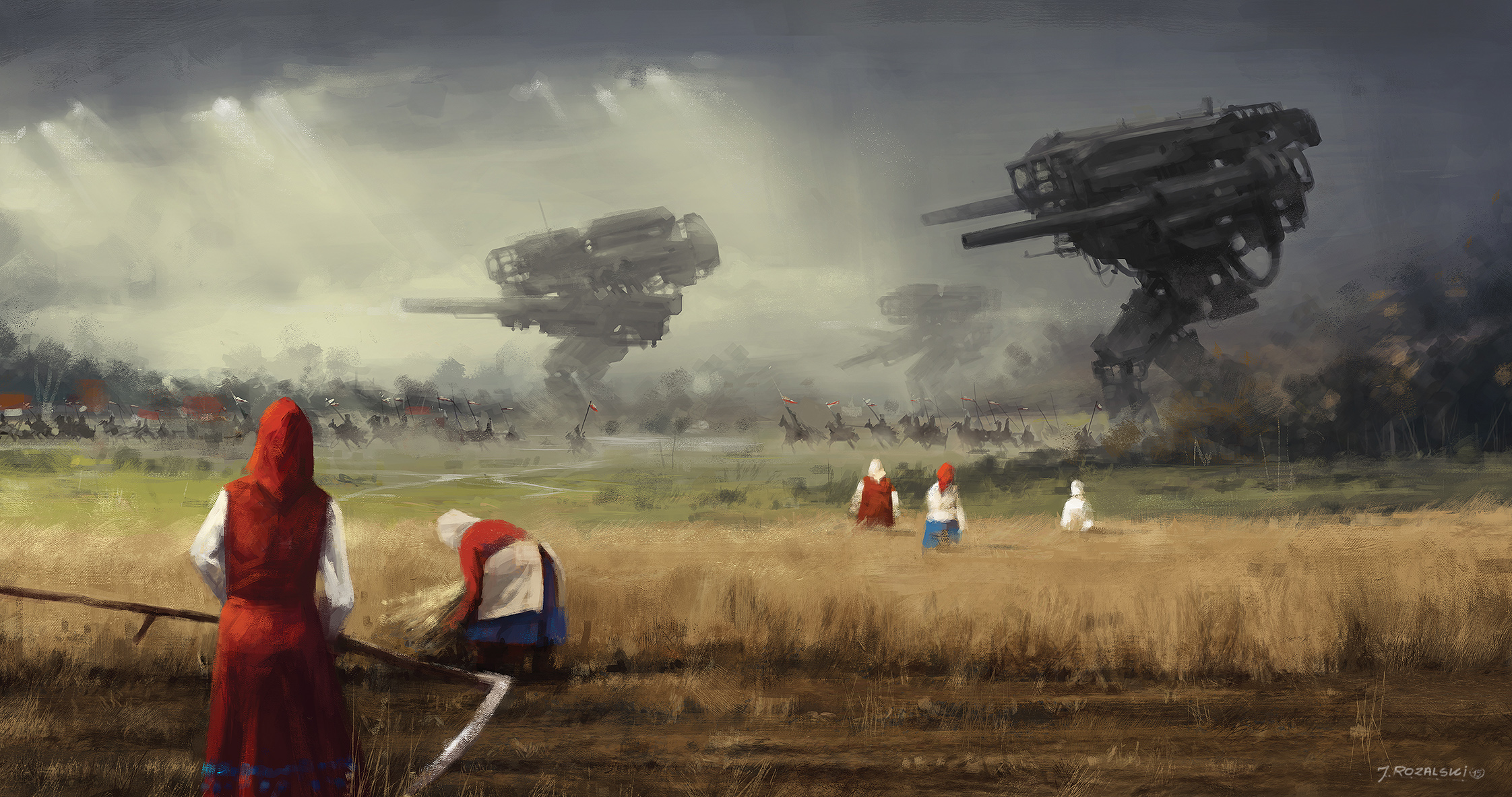
Painting by Różalski, 1920 – Before the Storm, used as the cover for the board game Scythe

Różalski created concept art illustrations for the 2017 Kong: Skull Island film. In 2018, an artbook featuring his works, titled Howling at the Moon, was published.

The 2016 board game Scythe was inspired by his art; Różalski has contributed dozens of illustrations for the game. It is the first major work in what Różalski calls the 1920+ universe, set in an alternative history universe, around the time of the Polish–Soviet War, but incorporating science fiction elements like dieselpunk or steampunk airships and mecha. This style has also been described as inspired by classic works by Józef Chełmoński, but updated for the new century; as "The Witcher meets mecha". The next major installment in the 1920+ series is the Iron Harvest real-time strategy video game, in development by King Art Games, announced in 2016. The game had a successful crowdfunding phase in 2018 and has been released in September 2020.

== Influences ==
In 2017 a short film by Neill Blomkamp, based on Różalski's works and showing an alternate 15th century era around the time of the Battle of Grunwald, was announced.

In 2018, a Polish science-fiction short story anthology, inspired by his art, titled Inne światy Jakuba Różalskiego (Other Worlds of Jakub Różalski) was published. Writers who published stories in the anthology were Sylwia Chutnik, Jacek Dukaj, Aneta Jadowska, Anna Kańtoch, Jakub Małecki, Remigiusz Mróz, Łukasz Orbitowski, Robert J. Szmidt, Aleksandra Zielińska, and Jakub Żulczyk.

Jamey Stegmaier noted that Różalski "[...] used some references [...] and photos from the internet, in several [works] (maybe 10, maybe more) [by] track[ing] photo[s] in 1:1, for some elements like: horses or pigs, cow[s], or specific parts, even some characters."

== Artistic style ==
Różalski's style combines the classic art style of painters like Ivan Shishkin, Isaac Levitan, Józef Brandt, Aleksander Gierymski, and Józef Chełmoński, whom he cites as highly influential on his style, with modern fantasy and science fiction concepts.

== Recognition ==
Since 2018 his works have been part of the permanent exhibition in the Museum of Magical Realism "Ochorowiczówka" in Wisła, Poland. That same year, Różalski received the Annual Award of the Ministry of Culture and National Heritage in the field of "digital culture".
