= RPM Orchestra =

- Origin: Phoenix, Arizona, United States
- Genres: Experimental; Industrial; Americana; Dieselpunk; Avant-Garde; Psychedelic
- Years active: 2008–2022
- Members: Pete Petrisko (conductor, acoustic Foley effects, shortwave radios, typewriter; filmmaker); Jim Dustan (analog synth, banjo, bass, guitar, harmonica, zither; studio production & live sound engineering); Jocelyn Ruiz (clarinet, flute, found objects, glockenspiel, keyboards, melodica, vocals); Erik Hunter (drums, percussion, digital samples); Vic VOID (salvaged-material instruments, granular synthesis)
- Past members: Kathleen D. Cone; Dan Montes; Jenna Moody; Omar AKA WildBill; Rocky Yazzie
- Website: http://rpmorchestra.com/

RPM Orchestra was a proto-Industrial Americana music quintet based in Phoenix, Arizona.

The orchestra composed and performed original film scores to accompany films of the Silent Era (era of films from 1894—1931, which had no sound), provided musical scores in collaborative multidisciplinary performances, recorded soundtrack music for contemporary films, and regularly performed at various music venues.

== Origins and history ==
Started in late 2008 as a studio project by Pete Petrisko, the orchestra transformed into a live multiple-member ensemble in 2009. Its line-up varied, between three and seven musicians, until 2012, when group membership solidified with Petrisko, Jim Dustan, Jocelyn Ruiz, and Vic Void playing together regularly. Erik Hunter joined in 2014, officially making the ensemble a quintet.

Cited as a "band staffed by futurists and dadaists who take the sounds of the past and filter them into the heads of today's audiences", the orchestra is most identified with dieselpunk music - combining elements of Jazz, Swing, and Bluegrass commonly found during the Diesel Era, with its own unique instrumentation and avant-garde composition. Additionally, it draws from the "noise" aesthetic of Proto-Industrial music harkening back to the Russian avant-garde period.

The orchestra favors Electroacoustic music and Acousmatic sound techniques, and the use of contact microphones, in addition to traditional instruments, when creating elements of its music. Its eclectic sound has not gone unnoticed, RPM Orchestra holds distinction as the "Oddest Band in Phoenix".

Best known for composing original scores to accompany films of the Silent Era, performed in front of a theater audience during screenings, RPM Orchestra was awarded Best of Phoenix 2018 - Best Live Accompaniment by Phoenix New Times, which wrote, "Combining old-timey instrumentation with radio sounds, haunting samples, and modern noise, RPM creates compelling and timeless soundscapes."

RPM Orchestra disbanded in late 2022, ending after a 14 year run.

== Discography ==
=== Albums ===
- Afterglow (2009, Onewordlong)
- Roundabout (2010, suRRism-Phonoethics)
- Blossoms (2012, Absence of Wax)
- Three Uses of the Knife (2013, Sirona Records)
- Hit on all Sixes (2015, 56th Street Records)
- Canary (2015, suRRism-Phonoethics)
- Stepwise (2017, Onus Records)

=== EPs ===
- Singles and Tenfold (2019, two EPs simultaneously released)
- Revved Up (2022, independently released)

=== Compilations ===
- The Sepiachord Almanac (2012)
- When in AZ Vol. 2 (2018)

== Film scores ==
RPM Orchestra is listed in the Silent Film Musicians Directory, a comprehensive worldwide compendium of modern-day silent film musicians and composers.

=== Silent Era feature film scores ===
- Tod Browning's The Unknown (1927), premiered 2011, 2nd performance in 2021.
- D.W. Griffith's Broken Blossoms (1919), premiered 2012.
- W.W. Young's Alice in Wonderland (1915), premiered 2012, 2nd performance in 2018.
- F.W. Murnau's Faust (1926), premiered 2013, multidisciplinary performance with Dulce Dance, poets Jack Evans and E. Moncada.
- Robert Wiene's The Cabinet of Dr. Caligari (1920), premiered 2014, with two additional performances in 2017.
- Buster Keaton's Go West (1925), premiered 2015.
- Paul Leni's The Cat and the Canary (1927), premiered 2015.
- J. Searle Dawley's Snow White (1916), premiered 2016.
- F.W. Murnau's Nosferatu (1922), premiered 2016, 2nd performance in 2019, 3rd performance in 2022.
- Holger-Madsen's A Trip to Mars (1918), premiered 2017.
- Wallace Worsley's The Penalty (1920), premiered 2018.
- Rupert Julian's The Phantom of the Opera (1925), premiered 2018.
- Fred C. Newmeyer and Sam Taylor's Safety Last! (1923), premiered 2019.
- Mario Roncoroni's Filibus (1915), premiered 2022.

=== Silent Era short film scores ===
- Luis Buñuel and Salvador Dalí's Un Chien Andalou (1929), premiered 2012.
- Hal Roach's It's A Gift (1923) starring Snub Pollard, premiered 2018.
- Georges Méliès' A Trip to the Moon (1902), premiered 2019.
- Edwin S. Porter and Wallace McCutcheon's Dream of a Rarebit Fiend (1906), premiered 2019.
- Edwin S. Porter's The Great Train Robbery (1903), premiered 2019.
- Hans Richter's Ghosts Before Breakfast (1928), premiered 2020.
- J. Searle Dawley's Frankenstein (1910), premiered 2021.

=== Contemporary film scores ===
- Deserted (2014) - Bandersnatch Media
- Unspoken (2018) - a film short by Pete Petrisko
- Fever Broke at Five Past the Hour (2019) - a film short by Pete Petrisko
- Shine Turn (2020) - a film short by Pete Petrisko

== Multidisciplinary performances ==
- BUTOH + MUSIC (Premiered 2012). A Butoh dance and music collaboration with choreographer/dancer Debra Minghi, performed live as part of Phoenix's Art Detour 24. The performance was recorded by several cameras, including audience cellphones, and edited into a stand-alone film .
- Faust (Premiered 2013) A multidisciplinary silent film performance with Dulce Dance, and poets Jack Evans and Ernesto Moncada.
- Animalogue (Premiered 2013) A performance choreographed by Debra Minghi, three dancers combining elements of classical ballet, animal posturing, and folklorico dance, with a live musical score by RPM Orchestra. Multicultural in scope and primal by nature; it examined animal hierarchy (i.e. the food chain), social status control issues, gender politics (from role reversal to androgyny) with elements of our analog past transformed into our digital future. This performance was funded via the National Endowment for the Arts' Our Town grant program, as part of Roosevelt Row CDC's A.R.T.S. project series.
- Marching In Circles Marching Band (2015) A multi-location marching performance, in which the band (with four additional musicians) visited & played in three distinct districts in Phoenix (Roosevelt Row, Lower Grand Ave, and Midtown) on the same night.
