= Finn Wold =

Norwegian-American biochemist (1928–1997)

- Born: February 3, 1928; Stavanger, Norway
- Died: April 14, 1997 (aged 69); Houston, Texas, U.S.
- Education: University of Oslo; University of California, Berkeley
- Known for: Rhodopsin
- Scientific career
- Fields: Biochemistry
- Workplaces: University of Illinois, Urbana; University of Minnesota; University of Texas Medical School
- Doctoral advisor: Clinton Ballou
- Doctoral students: Paul Hargrave

Finn Wold (February 3, 1928 – April 14, 1997) was a Norwegian-American biochemist known for the elucidation of structure-function relationships of proteins. Wold was a pioneer in the use of reagents to measure and decipher the structures of proteins. He reported one of the first examples of a transition state analogue, and was at the forefront of the design and use of affinity labels.

== Education ==
Wold received a B.S. in chemistry from the University of Oslo in 1950, then received a Fulbright Fellowship for graduate studies at Oklahoma State University, where he earned an M.S. in chemistry in 1953. He went on to receive a Ph.D. in biochemistry from the University of California, Berkeley, in 1956, studying under Clinton E. Ballou.

== Career ==
After postdoctoral work at Berkeley, Wold joined the Chemistry Department at the University of Illinois, Urbana, in 1957. He received a Guggenheim Fellowship in 1960. In 1966. he moved to the University of Minnesota Medical School in Minneapolis, and served as head of the Department of Biochemistry in the College of Biomedical Sciences at the University of Minnesota from 1974 to 1979. In 1982, he was appointed Robert A. Welch Professor of Chemistry in the Department of Biochemistry and Molecular Biology at the University of Texas Medical School in Houston, a position which he held until his death in 1997.

Wold helped to found the Protein Society, a not-for-profit scholarly society for scientists involved in the study of protein structure, function, and design. He served as the organization's second president from 1989-1991, and helped launch the journal Protein Science. He also served as an elected officer or councilor for the American Society of Biochemistry and Molecular Biology, the Biological Chemistry Division of the American Chemical Society, and the Journal of Biological Chemistry and Biochemistry.

== Death ==
Wold died of cancer on April 14, 1997.
