= Stonemaier Games =

American board game publisher

- Type: Board game publisher
- Founded: 2012
- Founders: Jamey Stegmaier; Alan Stone
- Headquarters: St. Louis, Missouri, U.S.
- Number of employees: 8
- Website: https://stonemaiergames.com

Stonemaier Games is an American board game publishing company founded in 2012 by Jamey Stegmaier and Alan Stone. It is known for the games Viticulture, Wingspan, and Scythe.

== History ==
Stonemaier Games was founded in St. Louis, Missouri, by Jamey Stegmaier, a student at Washington University in St. Louis, and Alan Stone. In 2012, Stegmaier and Stone crowdfunded funds for the publication of their first game,Viticulture, on Kickstarter, earning about $65,000 from supporters. For legal reasons, they formed a limited liability company titled "Stonemaier Inc.", which would allow them both to self-publish games that they designed and games from other designers. According to Stegmaier, early ownership of the company was split evenly between himself, Stone, and two other partners, but this was later restructured such that Stegmaier and Stone were the sole owners, with former as the majority partner. Stonemaier Games hired additional staff in 2023, and as of then employs one part-time and seven full-time employees.

In 2019, Stonemaier Games published Wingspan, which was featured in publications such as The New York Times, The Guardian, and Vox, receiving widespread acclaim. Demand for the game upon release was far greater than expected, and Stonemaier Games issued an apology for initial supply issues. Wingspan is the company's largest selling game to date, with 1.9 million copies sold as of March 2024 and overall sales at the company largely related to those of the game. The successor to the game, Wyrmspan, published in 2024, is themed around mythical dragons. In Finspan, released in 2025, players explore aquatic life.

In February 2024, Stonemaier Games acquired the publishing rights for all Tokaido brand board games, including Namiji and Tokaido Duo, from Funforge. On April 24, 2024, Stonemaier Games announced their next game Vantage, to be published in 2025.

Following the introduction of tariffs by the second Trump administration which included 145% tariffs on goods imported from China, Stonemaier announced its intention to join a lawsuit against United States President Donald Trump, handled by Pacific Legal Foundation. It stated that its tariff payments alone would amount to nearly $1.5 million and impact its imports of Vantage to the US; Stegmaier wrote that "We will not stand idly by while our livelihoods–and the livelihoods of thousands of small business owners and contractors in the US, along with the customers whose pursuit of happiness we hold dear–are treated like pawns in a political game."

== Published games ==
- Apiary
- Between Two Castles of Mad King Ludwig
- Between Two Cities
- Charterstone
- Euphoria
- Expeditions
- Finspan
- Libertalia: Winds of Galecrest (adapted from the Asterion Press version)
- My Little Scythe
- Origin Story
- Pendulum
- Red Rising
- Rolling Realms
- Scythe
- Smitten
- Smitten 2
- Stamp Swap
- Tapestry
- Tokaido (acquired from Funforge)
- Tokaido Duo (acquired from Funforge)
- Vantage
- Viticulture
- Wingspan
- Wyrmspan
