= Tapestry (board game) =

2019 strategy board game

- Publishers: Stonemaier Games
- Genres: Strategy game Board game Civilization game
- Players: 1-5
- Setup time: 5 minutes
- Playing time: 90-120 minutes
- Age range: 12+
- Skills: Strategy

Tapestry is a 2019 strategy board game designed by Jamey Stegmaier and published by Stonemaier Games.

== Gameplay ==
At the beginning of the game, each player is given a choice between two civilizations that they will use throughout the whole game. Unlike most other games of the same genre, the civilizations are not based on historical civilizations, and the game does not attempt to closely simulate the progression of real-world history. Each civilization has unique advantages and characteristics. Players are also given an income mat and a capital city mat. The income mat has 4 income tracks, each with 6 spaces, 5 of which are filled with income buildings at the start of the game. Income mats also have a resource track and a tapestry card row. There are 4 resources in tapestry: coins, workers, food, and culture. Uncovered spaces on income tracks provide victory points, resources, tapestry cards, and territory tiles whenever a player takes an income turn. Whenever income buildings and landmarks are gained, they are placed on a space in the player's capital city mat. All of the capital city mats are divided into 9 districts of 9 squares each. Whenever a district is completed by filling in its squares with income buildings or landmarks, the player gains a resource of their choice. Completed rows and columns score victory points during income turns. Capital city mats have impassable plots, which buildings and landmarks cannot be placed on, but do count towards district, row, and column completion. However, buildings and landmarks can be placed outside of the mat's grid.

On a player's turn, they can either take an income turn or an advancement turn. An income turn denotes the start of a new era. Players will first use their civilization's ability if applicable. Second, they will play a tapestry card onto their income mat. Tapestry cards provide either an immediate benefit or a benefit which contains throughout the era. Third, they may upgrade a technology card. Technology cards have a 'circle' and a 'square' benefit. Rows for tech cards are shown on the right of a player's capital city mat. When a player gains a tech card, it is placed in the bottom 'cross' row. Whenever it is upgraded, it moves up to a higher row and the player gains the benefit listed on the tech card for that row. Next, they gain victory points for exposed victory point icons on their income tracks. Finally, they gain resources for exposed resource icons on their income tracks, as well as a tapestry card and a territory tile.

If the player chooses to take an advancement turn, they pay a resource cost to move one space down an advancement track. They then gain the benefit of the space they are now on and may pay an additional cost to gain a bonus benefit. Tapestry has 4 advancement tracks: Technology, Science, Exploration, and Military. Each track is split into 4 tiers, numbered I - IV, each with an increasing resource cost. The first player into tiers II-IV on each advancement track gains a unique landmark to place in their capital city.

The game ends for a player after their fifth income turn. Thus, the game ends at different times for each player. The winner of the game is the player with the most victory points.

== Reception ==
Among game reviewers, Tapestry has been "divisive". Dicebreaker noted the many possible routes to victory as a positive element. Abram Towle also praised this aspect of the game and gave it an overall positive review, stating, "Put another one up in the 'win' category for Stonemaier Games." Writing for Ars Technica, Dan Thurot praised the game's simplicity relative to other "civilization" games, stating, "In a genre packed with over-complicated (and over-long) entries, Tapestry fulfills its promise of a two-hour civilization game with minimal rules." He noted, however, that it does not allow for the "narrative" element common to most civilization games. Additionally, both Thurot and Dicebreaker expressed some disappointment that the building miniatures ultimately did nothing more than take up space on the player's capital city board.

== See also ==
- Scythe, a 2016 board game also designed by Jamey Stegmaier
