= Elizabeth Hargrave =

American game designer

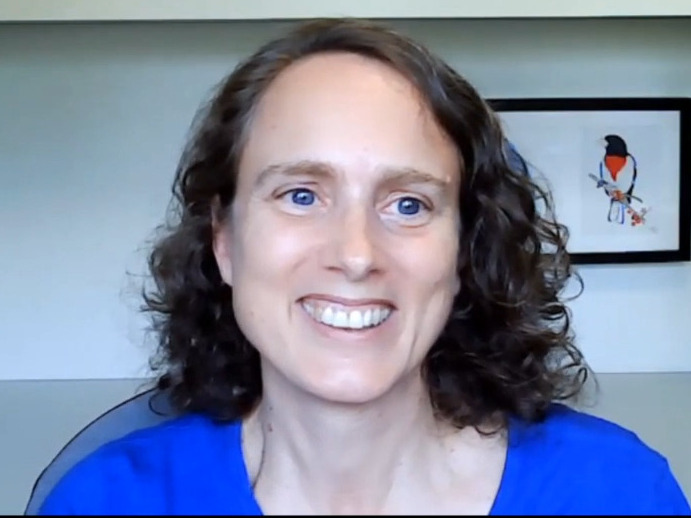
- Education: LBJ School of Public Affairs Brown University
- Occupation: Game designer
- Years active: 2014–present
- Known for: 2019 Kennerspiel des Jahres for Wingspan
- Notable work: Wingspan
- Father: Paul Hargrave

Elizabeth Hargrave is an American game designer. She has designed several games, including Wingspan, which won the 2019 Kennerspiel des Jahres for best connoisseur game of the year, Tussie-Mussie and Mariposas.

== Early life, education and early career ==
Hargrave grew up in Florida. Her father, Paul Hargrave, was a biochemist. Growing up, she played games with her family, particularly Scrabble and hearts, and played gin rummy in high school. In 1994, she graduated from Brown University, and she went on to earn her Master's in Public Affairs from the Lyndon B. Johnson School of Public Affairs. Following this, Hargrave worked for many years in Washington, DC, first at the Department of Health and Human Services, then for US Senator Tom Daschle, and later as a public policy analyst at the University of Chicago's National Opinion Research Center. Her policy research included prescription drug policy, and work for the Medicare Payment Advisory Commission. Hargrave was featured in a US News Money article discussing the U.S. 2012 Medicare Part D Plan. She was described by The New York Times as "a spreadsheet geek".

== Board game design ==
Meeting regularly with others from the Washington, DC area to play board games, Hargrave got the idea to start designing games based on themes from nature in 2014 at one such event, according to Audubon: To another interviewer, Hargrave explained she felt "there were too many games about castles and space, and not enough games about things I’m interested in. So I decided to make a game about something I cared about." Hargrave designed Wingspan using online data from the Cornell Lab of Ornithology and from the National Audubon Society. She describes the game as "a card-based engine-building game about bringing birds into a nature preserve." Hargrave pitched the game (then called "Bring in the Birds") to three different publishers at Gen Con in 2016; it was bought by Stonemaier Games. Published in 2019, the game sold 44,000 copies worldwide over three printings in its first two months of release, with the publisher issuing a public apology for not having more copies available. Wingspan received critical acclaim for its theme, component quality, accessibility, and gameplay. It also won the 2019 Kennerspiel des Jahres for best connoisseur game of the year.

Hargrave created the game Tussie Mussie in 2018 during the month leading up to the 2018 Game Design contest of Gen Can't. Each game card shows a different flower, together with text describing its secret meaning in the Victorian "language of flowers." After winning the Gen Can't contest, the game was published in 2019 by Button Shy Games, funded by a Kickstarter campaign with a $1000 goal that instead brought in more than $80,000.

Hargrave had begun work on Mariposas (Spanish for "butterflies"), a game about migrating monarch butterflies in 2018, and she sold it to game publisher Alderac Entertainment Group (AEG), who had put out a call for women game designers, in 2019. Hargrave told an interviewer the project was inspired partly by visiting a Mexican butterfly sanctuary in 2003 and partly by reading Barbara Kingsolver's 2012 novel Flight Behavior. It was published in 2020 and was described as family-friendly game aimed at a broader audience than Wingspan. The game's components and its environmental message also earned praise.

Hargrave published a game about domestication of foxes, The Fox Experiment, in 2023. In November 2023 she published Undergrove, a game about mycorrhizal networks. She has stated that a commonality in her games is “something cool in the world that I want people to know about, that I think maybe a lot of people don’t pay attention to.”

== Political activism ==
Hargrave has mentored and tried to push forward women, nonbinary people and people of color as game designers. In 2023, after she pointed out the lack of female representation in the board game industry, she was the target of sexist comments from Ryan Dancey, then-COO of AEG.

== Personal life ==
Hargrave lives in Silver Spring, Maryland with her husband, landscape designer and forager Matt Cohen. A New York Times article about their garden described it as "brimming with food for insect pollinators, birds and people."

She travelled to Belize in 2019 to volunteer her time supporting research scientists who track shark and stingray populations. She assisted with the catching, tagging and measurement of stingrays and sharks.
