= Apiary (board game) =

Board game

- Designers: Connie Vogelmann
- Illustrators: Kwanchai Moriya
- Publishers: Stonemaier Games
- Publication: 2023; 3 years ago
- Genres: Strategy game; Tile-based game
- Players: 1–5
- Playing time: 60–90 minutes
- Age range: 14+

Apiary is a tile-based strategy game designed by Connie Vogelmann and published in 2023 by Stonemaier Games. Players control a faction of spacefaring bees as they explore, gather resources, and advance their hive before hibernation.

== Publishing history ==
Apiary was the design debut of Connie Vogelmann and was illustrated by Kwanchai Moriya. It was first available for digital purchase from the Stonemaier Games website and at the 2023 Essen Spiel before its retail release in November of 2023.

== Gameplay ==
Apiary is played on one shared board with sections such as an exploration map where the "QueenShip" token can be moved around through space, the "Hibernation Comb" where advanced bees are placed into hibernation, and locations for advancement tiles, carving tiles, and Seed Cards, representing the different actions a player can take on their turn. Each player receives a hive mat where their individual faction of bees will build their civilization, and a docking mat which has two sections: the landing area where their non-active bee tokens are stored, and the active pool where bee tokens which are ready to be put into play are kept. Worker bees each have a Strength value from 1 to 4 which can be increased during play.

On their turn, a player chooses to either place a worker bee from their docking mat into play or retrieve all their in-play pieces, collect income, and increase each bee's Strength by 1. If a worker bee is placed on an occupied tile, the piece there is replaced and "bumped" back to either its hive's landing area with no Strength increase or its active pool with a Strength increase of one. Income is collected from farm tiles when a worker moves into its landing area. A bee placed on a tile performs the action depicted on it:

- Explore: Move the QueenShip spaces equal to the sum Strength of the workers on Explore tiles, reveal the ending planet if unexplored, and gain the planet's depicted Resource Tokens.
- Advance: Pay the resource cost on an unused tile to place it in the player's hive, then gain that tile's benefit.
- Grow: Add a Strength-1 worker to the player's active pool and choose whether to pay resources to add additional spaces for building to the hive.
- Convert: Pay basic resources (pollen, fiber, water) to gain other basic resources or more advanced ones (wax, honey).
- Research: Draw a Seed Card, which can be discarded at the end of any turn to gain the one-time reward or resources.
- Carve: Pay honey to claim an unused carving tile and place it in the player's hive.

Strength-4 workers gain additional benefits when they take an action, can plant Seed Cards for end-game victory points instead of discarding them, and are the only pieces that can be placed on Carve spaces; if one of these pieces would ever move back to its hive or increase level, the player instead places a Hibernation Token in the Hibernation Comb, receives the listed reward, and discards the worker.

Various action bonuses and excess resources discarded at the end of each player's turn earn Queen's Favor points, which are tracked along the Queen's Favor Track on the main board. The game ends one final turn after either the Hibernation Comb becomes full or a player uses all of their Hibernation Tokens, and the winner is the player with the most victory points. Victory points are awarded both during and after the game for hive size, Seed Cards, action bonuses, position along the Queen's Favor track, and more.

== Reception ==
IGN rated Apiary 8/10, with Matt Thrower noting that "it has enough interaction to interest those who like to engage directly with their fellow players" but "perhaps leans too often on the comfortable conventions of its straight-laced genre" and that "despite its appealing theme, and it really needs repeat plays to get to grips with its rich systems". Charlie Hall, writing for Polygon, praised the gameplay and illustrations, writing that "The game is excellent, easy to teach, and rewards multiple playthroughs" but heavily criticizing that the game's art is largely obscured by tokens and pieces when playing. In a review for Paste, Keith Law praised Apiary's game design and illustrations, reservedly recommending the game but concluding that "I just couldn’t connect with it like I thought I would after the first play".
