= Scythe (board game) =

Board game set in an alternative history version of 1920s Europe

- Designers: Jamey Stegmaier
- Illustrators: Jakub Różalski
- Publishers: Stonemaier Games (2016)
- Players: 1–5
- Playing time: 90–115 minutes
- Age range: 14+
- Skills: Strategy, tactics, logic

Scythe is a board game for one to five players designed by Jamey Stegmaier and published by Stonemaier Games in 2016. Set in an alternative history version of 1920s Europe, players control factions that produce resources, develop economic infrastructure, and use dieselpunk combat mechs to engage in combat and control territories. Players take up to two actions per turn using individual player boards, and the game proceeds until one player has earned six achievements. At this point, the players receive coins for the achievements they have attained and the territories they control, and the player with the most coins is declared the winner.

Stonemaier Games crowdfunded the development of Scythe, raising over $1.8 million through a Kickstarter campaign. Scythe was released to critical and commercial praise for its gameplay, combination of Eurogame and combat mechanics, theme, and the game artwork, which was produced by Polish painter Jakub Różalski under the name World of 1920+. Three major expansions, a spin-off, and a digital version have been released for the game.

Expeditions, a standalone sequel to Scythe, was released September 2023.

== Gameplay ==
Scythe gameplay

Scythe takes place in an alternative history version of 1920s Europe that is recovering from the effects of the Great War. Players represent different factions seeking their fortune in the redeveloping landscape. Players build an economic engine by selecting one of four main actions each turn. Each action is listed on the top of a personal player board, and players cannot take the same action in consecutive turns. They may also take a corresponding second action as listed on their player board. Actions allow players to move units on the board, trade for or produce goods, bolster their military for combat, deploy mechs, enlist recruits for continuous bonuses, or build structures. The actions themselves may also be upgraded, making them either less costly to enact or stronger when deployed.

Each player is given six stars, which are placed on the board when they complete specific goals, such as deploying all four of their mechs. The game immediately ends when one player has placed 6 stars. Players then tally the money that they receive from achievements earned, territory controlled, and gathered resources based on their in-game popularity achieved; the player who finishes the game with the most money wins.

== Development and release ==
Scythe was designed by Jamey Stegmaier, the CEO of Stonemaier Games, and was revealed as a Kickstarter campaign on October 13, 2015. Backers contributed over $1.8 million to the campaign. Physical copies of the game were delivered to backers in July 2016; it was later released in Gen Con and other retail stores the following month.

Approximately 130 alternate history artworks were illustrated by the Polish artist Jakub Różalski. The game's theme is set in the 1920+ alternate history universe, which was inspired by the Polish–Soviet War of 1919–1921, and also later used in Iron Harvest. The plot focuses on the conflict between several nations in Central and Eastern Europe that occurred in the aftermath of World War I. The factions are Polania, Rusviet, Saxony, Crimea, Nordic (based on Poland, Soviet Russia, Imperial Germany, Crimean Khanate, and Scandinavia, respectively). The video gaming website Polygon also stated that the artwork also was "the inspiration for dozens of objective and narrative cards".

During playtesting, Stegmaier asked players to quantitatively rate the game with a maximum score of ten, and described that "when I start to see those ratings creep over 8, I know we’re getting really close". Scythe also includes the Automa, a solo-player mode designed by Morten Monrad Pedersen, who also contributed to other Stonemaier Games products including Wingspan and Viticulture. He stated the difficulty in designing one-player games was for the Automas to resemble human players while being streamlined, which required "a purging of unnecessary mechanics" to reduce the downtime.

=== Expansions ===
Scythe has received three major expansions and several promotional packages. The first expansion, Scythe: Invaders from Afar, was released in 2016. It added new player mats and two new factions into the game, increasing the player count from five to seven. The new factions are Albion and Togawa (based on United Kingdom and Japan, respectively). The second expansion, Scythe: The Wind Gambit, was released in 2017, featuring airships and adding variable end-game conditions to the base game. The Wind Gambit was met with praise for its new victory conditions and components, but the airships were critiqued for providing only limited appeal as the game progressed. In 2017, The Wind Gambit won the Golden Geek Award for Best Game Expansion.

Scythe: The Rise of Fenris was published in 2018 as the third expansion of Scythe. It introduced 11 modules, featuring an eight-episode campaign, two factions (Fenris and Vesna), a cooperative mode, and a multiplayer Automa variant. The Rise of Fenris was met with positive reviews, winning the 2018 Golden Geek Award for Best Game Expansion. Hall praised the storyline, art, and enhancements to replayability provided by the expansion, while Williams described each module as "mind-blowing" and the campaign as "flavorful, exciting, memorable and, most importantly, extremely fun".

Outside of traditional expansions, Stonemaier Games has released several promotional packages for Scythe. Scythe Encounters, published in December 2018, included a set of 32 promotional encounter cards designed primarily from fan submissions. Scythe Modular Board, which alters the in-game map, was released in July 2019. In late 2020, Scythe Complete Rulebook was released. It was compiled by Matt Griepp and Brittany Griepp, and combined rulebooks for the base game and expansions.

=== Alternate versions ===
In 2017, Stonemaier Games published a stand-alone spin-off to Scythe. Titled My Little Scythe, the game was initially a fan project that was later developed into a print and play designed by Hoby and Vienna Chou, which received the 2017 Golden Geek Award for Best Print and Play game. The game was inspired by Scythe and featured similar mechanisms, but was re-themed and simplified for a more casual, family-friendly experience. Initially, the designer wanted to incorporate the My Little Pony franchise, although due to problems with licensing, the board game is not directly connected to that franchise. An expansion adding two new factions and airships, titled My Little Scythe: Pie in the Sky, was released in June 2020.

In a Techraptor review, Travis Williams praised the game’s accessibility, engagement, mechanics, playtime, and components. This sentiment was echoed by Polygon, which also praised the game's accessibility and mechanics. Michał Szewczyk from Rebel Times concluded that the game is a well-executed if simplified version of Scythe, bridging the world of serious board games and family games.

In 2018, Scythe: Digital Edition, a video game, was released by Asmodee Digital as a digital adaptation of Scythe. The game was released on 5 September 2018 on Steam for PC, including both Mac and Windows. In 2020, a mobile version was subsequently released and available to download on iOS and Android. Iron Harvest, a real-time strategy game inspired by Scythe's 1920s setting, was also released in September 2020, and was positively received for its artwork and thematic setting.

=== Sequel ===
A standalone sequel to Scythe, called Expeditions, was announced February 2023. The game was released September 29, 2023, featuring design by Stegmaier, with Rozalski providing art and worldbuilding. In Expeditions, players have to explore and gather resources. It is a competitive game, but does not feature warfare like Scythe. Instead, the players gain points by performing various feats, such as collecting cards, completing quests, and upgrading their mechs.

Expeditions was met with positive feedback. Samantha Nelson of IGN gave the game a score of eight out of ten, calling it "a worthy successor to Scythe," also praising its art and compononents. Kristoffer Hamborg of Avisen Danmark gave it five out of six stars, praising its game mechanics and rhythm, saying that "if one is a fan of worker placement, Expeditions is worth checking out."

A digital demo version of Expeditions is available through Tabletopia.

== Reception ==
Scythe was released to acclaim from board game critics, who praised its mechanism, gameplay, and art. It was listed as one of the best games of 2016 by several reviewers, including William Herkewitz from Popular Mechanics, Aaron Zimmerman from Ars Technica, Tomasz Sokoluk from Rebel Times, and Peter Jenkinson from the Telegraph. The reviewer Aaron Zimmerman described it as a "deep, puzzly, interactive Euro-style board game". Zimmerman also praised the complementary nature of the simple turn structure and the "many complex, interlocking parts" of the engine building mechanics. This sentiment was echoed by Matt Jarvis from Tabletop Gaming, who praised the game's balance of depth and accessibility, the "cleverly designed" player mats, and as the encounter mechanism, which he believed "round[s] out Scythe's in-game universe and offer[s] a more micro-level human edge". Several years after its release, Scythe appeared on a list from Wirecutter of the best board games. The reviewers praised the game's "immense strategic depth" and "beautiful, steampunk-meets-pastoral idyll world-building aesthetic".

Reviewers particularly highlighted Scythe's use of Eurogame-style resource management and combat mechanics found in American-style board games. Zimmerman compared the simplicity of combat to the systems in Kemet and Dune, describing it as a "tense exercise", but also noted the relative infrequency of combat within the game world. Jarvis praised the "quick and highly strategic" combat system but found that resource production was instrumental for victory. Luke Plunkett from Kotaku also observed that resource management and construction were more significant for in-game success than combat. Różalski's artwork also received significant praise from reviewers, with Charlie Hall of Polygon acknowledging the game's use of artwork as a thematic core for objective and encounter cards and stating that each card "is a treasure". PC Gamer editor Jonathan Bolding also commended the art quality, noting that "[t]he cards have fascinating scenes of agrarian life juxtaposed with smoking dieselpunk mechs and war machines". Reviewing for the Dicebreaker, Alex Meehan praised the artwork displaying both the war setting and its "consequences on the ordinary people". She concluded that it was "a huge draw for players looking for a game with an arresting setting". Sokoluk also stated that the most distinctive element of the game is Różalski's art style, which has helped to create hype for the game even before its debut. Zimmerman was additionally complimentary, writing that the game is "tied together through the stunning art".

The single-player artificial opponent, the Automa, was also well-received. Plunkett praised the functionality of the Automa as "a great way to learn the ropes before getting a crew together", but noted that there were major differences between the game's single- and multiplayer modes. Travis Williams from TechRaptor agreed, saying that the Automa was "slickly designed" and praising its suitability as a non-player faction in multiplayer games.

Scythe received four Golden Geek Awards from BoardGameGeek in 2016, for Board Game of the Year, Artwork & Presentation, Strategy Game, and Solo Game, while also placing as a runner-up for Most Innovative. The game was also well received commercially: as of April 2021, Stonemaier Games had sold over 382,000 copies. Scythe had the highest sales of any Stonemaier Game until 2021, when it was surpassed by Wingspan.

Reception

Review scores
Publication	Score
Destructoid	7/10
CD-Action	6.5/10

Upon its release, Scythe: Digital Edition received mostly positive reviews upon its release on Steam. Calvin Wong Tze Loon from PC Gamer commended the "slick tutorial", the mechanisms, visuals, and the soundtrack; concluding that it was "evocative, clever, and rewarding". Keith Law from Ars Technica also praised the visuals of the adaptation and engagement but criticized the price of 20 dollars and complexity of the tutorial. In a mixed review, CD-Action noted the game's similarity with the original board game, stating that "Its biggest merit in the eyes of purists is arguably also its biggest flaw – Scythe: Digital Edition offers nothing that the original board game wouldn't".
