= Viticulture (board game) =

Board game published by Stonemaier Games

- Designers: Jamey Stegmaier, Alan Stone
- Illustrators: Jacqui Davis, David Montgomery, Beth Sobel
- Publishers: Stonemaier Games
- Publication: 2013; 13 years ago
- Players: 2-6
- Playing time: 90 minutes
- Age range: 13+
- Website: stonemaiergames.com/games/viticulture/

Viticulture is a worker placement board game published by Stonemaier Games in 2013. The game's design was crowdfunded via a campaign on Kickstarter, with the concept of players building an Italian vineyard. Upon its release, Viticulture received praise for its engagement, but its luck was critiqued. Several expansions and reprints were later released.

== Gameplay ==
In Viticulture, players operate a traditional Tuscan vineyard. Each round of the game represents one year of operation divided into four seasons.

Rounds begin with a spring season when the player chooses a location in the wake-up track that provides various benefits and determines turn order for the year. This is followed by summer, during which players place workers on the summer action spaces on the shared board, which enables a player to plant vines, sell grapes, gain money through tours, play a summer visitor card, draw a vine card, and erect structures. In the autumn season, players draw either a summer visitor or a winter visitor card. These cards have rule-breaking powers to help grow a player's vineyard and additional ways to earn victory points. The winter season also allows each player to place unused workers from the summer season on the winter action spaces. The spaces allow the player to harvest a field, process grapes into wine, fill wine orders, hire an additional worker, or play a winter visitor card. A round is completed when players have used all their workers. Then players age their grape and wine tokens, collect their workers, and collect any residual income from wine orders.

When a grape is planted on one of the player's fields on their personal boards, it could subsequently be harvested as grape tokens. These tokens can be processed into wine tokens during the winter season, which awards victory points through filling orders. When a player reaches at least twenty points, the game ends after the year is completed. The player with the most victory points is the winner.

== Expansions and versions ==
The first expansion set, released in May 2013 with the original version of the game, is called Arboriculture. The expansion set Tuscany was also funded via Kickstarter. The latter introduced a greater breadth of options for players to score victory points. It also created an asymmetric start to the game providing players with different options to establish their wine-making business.

An app version of the game was created by Digidiced.

=== Tuscany ===
The Tuscany expansion set includes numerous modular additions to the base game. The Grande Worker module allows a player to place a worker on any action even if that move is not available at the time, eliminating the possibility that players miss necessary actions. It was later incorporated into the base game. The Mamas and Papas module varies the resources with which players start the game. The Properties module enables a player to sell a parcel of land for cash, which is difficult to acquire in the early phases of the base game.

Other modules in the expansion set include Patronage, Advanced Visitors cards, New Visitors cards, and Structures cards. The latter enables a player to erect up to two special structures that add a victory point to the player's score and also provide additional game options for the player, such as a new action, a recurring bonus, or a residual at the end of each round.

The Extended Board module replaces the main game board. It is a significant modification of the original board, adding the spring and autumn actions. It modifies the seasons and player wake-up track, and changes the game-ending condition to 25 victory points, as there are more ways in which players can earn them.

The expansion also includes the Arboriculture and Formaggio expansions, which allow players to make fruits, olive oil, and cheese, as well as Mafia.

The module Special Workers adds numerous worker types to the game, each with additional functions but also usable as standard workers. These are the chef, farmer, innkeeper, mafioso, merchant, messenger, oracle, politico, professore, soldato, and traveller.

The Tuscany Essential Edition was later released in 2016, with only the three modules, the Extended Board, Special workers, and Structures, other variants were implemented in the Essential Edition.

=== Viticulture Essential Edition ===
In 2015, the Viticulture Essential Edition was released. It includes several expansion sets in Tuscany, including the Grande Worker, Mamas and Papas, Properties, Advanced Visitors cards, and the single-player Automa variant.

=== Other Expansions ===
Several new visitor card sets, including the Moor Visitor and Visits from the Rhine Valley, were also released for the game.

=== Viticulture World ===
In 2022, Viticulture World, a co-operative expansion for the base game, was released. It also includes six different card decks, with different rules and events. The Finnish review website Lautapeliopas praised its components, engagement, strategy, and replayability, but criticised the card draw introducing luck elements that affects the difficulty.

== Reception ==
Dave Banks, in a review for Wired, described the game as "wonderfully fun". In a review for Punchboard Media, Charles Hasegawa states that the game has a few flaws, particularly luck associated with drawing cards and that in the early phases of the game each player is "trying to do very similar things" with minor variation. He also described the Tuscany expansion as "a masterpiece of changes that turn an ok game into a more varied and more complex game".

By 2018, the game was ranked in the top 25 of all board games at BoardGameGeek.
