= Ava (given name) =

Feminine given name

- Pronunciation: English: /ˈeɪ.və/
- Gender: Feminine
- Language: English

Origin
- Languages: Old High German, Russian
- Derivation: Old High German: Aw- Russian: Ав-
- Meaning: Unknown

Other names
- Derivatives: Aveline, Avis, Eva
- Derived: Avel, Avelina, Avenir, Avenira, Aventin, Aventina, Aviafa, Avim, Aviya, August, Augusta
- Related names: Aibhilín, Éibhleann

Ava (English pronunciation: /ˈeɪ.və/) is an English feminine given name.

== Origin ==
The name originates from the 8th and 9th centuries during the Middle Ages as an abbreviation of Germanic names containing the element aw-, which is of uncertain meaning. Old High German compound dithematic names with the element include Avagisa, Avuldis, Awanpurc, and Auwanildis. The Oxford Dictionary of First Names supports the Germanic origin of Ava and additionally attributes Avis and Eva as derivatives that share the av‑ element. The dictionary also supposes that the name Aveline, source of the Irish names Éibhleann and Aibhilín, is a derivative of Ava.

The Dictionary of Russian Personal Names lists that in the Russian language, Ava (А́ва) is a derivative of various masculine and feminine given names. These names include August, Augusta, Avelina, Avenir, Avenira and Aventina, and rare old names such as Avel, Aventin, Aviafa, Avim and Aviya.

== Use ==
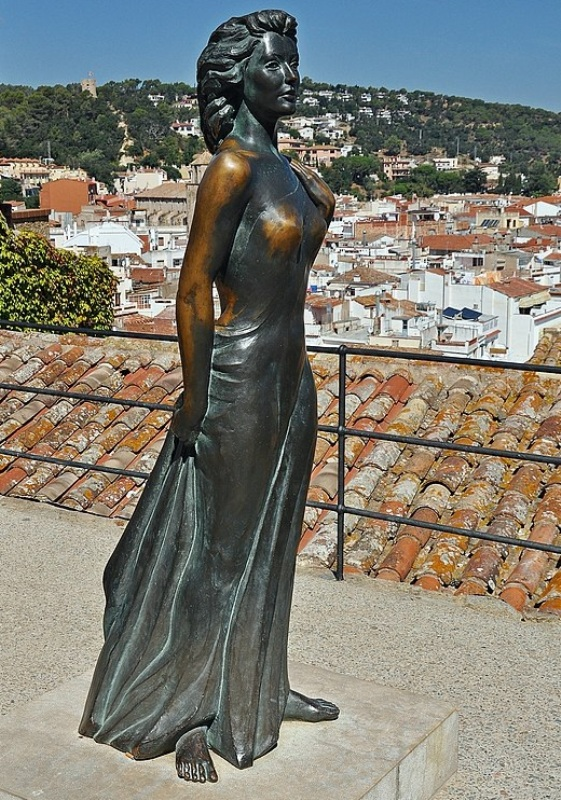
Hollywood actress Ava Gardner is credited with the name's increase of popularity in the 20th century.

There are fewer records of the name following the Middle Ages, and the Oxford Dictionary of First Names suggests it could also have been a modern invention. However, it gained popularity for babies during the 1950s. It then continued to gain popularity through leading Hollywood actress Ava Gardner. The name was also popularized in the United States by socialite Ava Lowle Willing (1868–1958) and her daughter, socialite and heiress Ava Alice Muriel Astor (1902–1956).

The name has been rising in popularity in the United States since the mid-1990s, but had its most dramatic jump in popularity in 1998, when it was the 350th most popular name for baby girls, jumping 268 places up the chart from 618th place in 1997. Ava was among the five most popular names for Black newborn girls in the American state of Virginia in 2022 and again in 2023. It was also among the top five names given to girls born to Asian mothers in Virginia in 2023. One factor in its increase in popularity in English-speaking countries may have been the naming of the daughters of actress Heather Locklear and musician Richie Sambora, in 1997, and of actors Reese Witherspoon and Ryan Phillippe in 1999. Phillippe said in a magazine interview that he and Witherspoon named their child after actress Ava Gardner.

As of 2024, Ava is the ninth most popular female baby name in the United States and the tenth in Canada. Additionally in 2023, it was the sixth most popular female baby name across England, Wales and New South Wales, and the twentieth most popular in New Zealand in 2025.

== See also ==
- Ava (disambiguation)
- Ada
- Ave
- Aviana
- Avie
- Eve
- Evelyn
