= Vena =

Vena may refer to:

== People ==
- Cornel Vena (1932–2017), Romanian Olympic modern pentathlete
- Gary Vena, American academic
- Ryan Vena (born 1977), American arena football player
- Vena, a diminutive of the Russian male first name Avenir
- Vena, a diminutive of the Russian female first name Avenira
- Vena, a diminutive of the Russian male first name Aventin
- Vena, a diminutive of the Russian female first name Aventina
- Vena, a variant of the female given name Slavena
- Vena, a variant of the female given name Venus
- Vena, a diminutive of the female given name Venetia

== Places ==
- Vena, Sweden
- Vena, Calabria, Italy

== Other uses ==
- Vena (album), by Coldrain, 2015
- Vena (film), 2024 German film
- Vena (group), an American bachata music group
- Vena (Hindu king), in Hinduism
- Vena Records, a defunct American record label
- Virtual Enterprise Network Architecture (VENA), Avaya cloud computing architecture
- 2S31 Vena, a Russian self-propelled mortar system

== See also ==
- Vena cava, a large vein in the human body
