= AFA =

Afa or AFA may refer to:

== Aviation ==
- Air force academy
- Air Force Academy, Colorado, a locality occupied by the U.S. Air Force Academy
- United States Air Force Academy
- Air Force Association
- American Flyers Airline
- Association of Flight Attendants
- Brazilian Air Force Academy (Portuguese: Academia da Força Aérea)
- San Rafael Airport (Argentina) in Mendoza Province, Argentina, by IATA code
- Portuguese Air Force Academy (Portuguese: Academia da Força Aérea)

== Governmental ==
- Afa, Corse-du-Sud, a commune in Corsica
- Afghani (currency), the currency of Afghanistan
- Agence française anticorruption, the French anti-corruption agency
- Alberta Foundation for the Arts, arts funding body of Alberta, Canada
- Andorran Financial Authority, the financial regulator of Andorra

== Entertainment ==
- Anime Festival Asia, annual ACG event in Southeast Asian countries
- Anthology Film Archives, a film archive and theater
- ARY Film Awards, a Pakistani Film Awarding Ceremony

== Mythology and religion ==
- Afá, a West African religion, also known as Ifá in some languages
- Afa (mythology), in the Polynesian mythology of Samoa

== Organizations ==
=== Argentina ===
- Argentine Football Association

=== Australia ===
- Aborigines' Friends' Association
- Atheist Foundation of Australia
- Australian Family Association

=== Austria ===
- Academic Forum for Foreign Affairs
- Austrian Football Association

=== Canada ===
- Alberta Farmers' Association

=== France ===
- Trâ Armânami Association of French Aromanians, or Association des Français Aroumains in French

=== Germany ===
- Accumulatoren-Fabrik AFA
- Agentur für Arbeit
- Antifaschistische Aktion
- General Federation of Free Employees (AfA-Bund)

=== Sweden ===
- Antifascistisk aktion

=== Taiwan ===
- Agriculture and Food Agency

=== United Kingdom ===
- Amateur Fencing Association, former name of British Fencing Association
- Amateur Football Alliance, formerly Amateur Football Association
- Anti-Fascist Action
- Atrial Fibrillation Association
- Associate Financial Accountant in the Institute of Financial Accountants
- Approved Franchise Association, one of three trade associations for the UK franchising industry

=== United States ===
==== Military ====
- Admiral Farragut Academy

==== Sports ====
- American Football Association (1884–1924), first organization for association football (soccer) in the U.S.
- American Football Association (1978–1983), a minor professional gridiron football league
- Arena Football Association, a minor professional indoor gridiron football league

==== Other ====
- Ad Fontes Academy
- Advertising Federation of America
- American Family Association
- American Farrier's Association
- American Federation of Arts
- American Federation of Astrologers
- American Finance Association
- American Forensics Association
- American Forestry Association
- American Freedom Agenda
- Arkansas Fire Academy
- Asatru Folk Assembly, formerly Asatru Free Assembly

=== In other countries ===
- Asian Farmers' Association for Sustainable Rural Development

== People ==
- Afa Ah Loo (d. 2025), Samoan fashion designer
- Afa Anoaʻi Jr. (born 1984), American professional wrestler
- Afa Anoaʻi (1942–2024), Samoan-American professional wrestler

== Other uses ==
- Afa, a diminutive of the Russian female first name Aviafa
- AFA, an all-flash array in computing
- AFA (automobile), a Spanish automobile
- Afro-Asiatic languages (ISO 639-3 code)
- Alternating finite automaton, in computer science
- Amfonelic acid, a stimulant and hallucinogen
- Anti-Foundation Axiom, a mathematical axiom
- Aphanizomenon flos-aquae, an edible blue-green algae
- Asian Film Awards, an annual Hong Kong award
