= Aventin (disambiguation) =

Aventin was a Frankish saint and hermit of the 8th century.

Aventin may also refer to:

== People ==
- Aventin (given name), a Russian given name
- Christine Aventin (born 1971), a French-language Belgian writer
- Diego Aventín (born 1980), an Argentine racing driver
- Oscar Aventín (born 1946), a retired Argentine race car driver
- Johannes Aventinus (1477–1534), Bavarian historian

== Other uses ==
- Saint-Aventin, a commune in the Haute-Garonne department in southwestern France
