= Venya =

Venya may refer to:

- Venya, a diminutive of the Russian male first name Veniamin
- Venya, a diminutive of the Russian male first name Avenir
- Venya, a diminutive of the Russian female first name Avenira
- Venya, a diminutive of the Russian male first name Aventin
- Venya, a diminutive of the Russian female first name Aventina
- Venya Drkin, stage name of Alexander Litvinov (1970–1999), Russian folk singer
- Venya, the rat from the Russian animated movie Space Dogs
- Venya, the third-level of Mount Celestia, a plane of existence in the Dungeons & Dragons fantasy role-playing game
- Venya, the main character in the Moscow-Petushki prose poem by Venedikt Yerofeyev
