= IMA =

IMA or Ima may refer to:

== Education ==
- Indian Military Academy, Dehradun
- Instituto Miguel Ángel, a school in Mexico City

== Galleries and museums ==
- Indianapolis Museum of Art, Indiana, US
- Institut du Monde Arabe, Paris, France
- Islamic Museum of Australia, Melbourne, Australia

== Science and medicine ==
- Ideomotor apraxia, a neurological disorder
- Imidazole-4-acetic acid, a neurotransmitter metabolite
- Inferior mesenteric artery
- Thyroid ima artery

== Music ==
- Ima (BT album), 1995
- Ima (Yvette Tollar album), 2008
- Ima, a 2002 album by Ima
- "Ima", a song by Bimi Ombale

== Organizations ==
- I Monetary Advisory, former Indian company
- Illinois Manufacturers' Association
- Illinois Mycological Association
- IMA (company) (Industria Macchine Automatiche S.p.A.), Bologna, Italy
- Indian Medical Association
- Industrial Mutual Association
- Institut du Monde Arabe (Arab World Institute), in Paris
- Institute for Mathematics and its Applications at the University of Minnesota
- Institute of Mathematics and its Applications, UK
- Institute of Mathematics and Applications, Bhubaneswar, India
- Institute of Management Accountants, U.S.
- International Marinelife Alliance, marine conservation
- International Mineralogical Association
- International Mycological Association
- Interactive Multimedia Association, former audio algorithm company
- Investment Management Association, UK
- Irish Medical Organisation, formerly Irish Medical Association
- Irish Museums Association
- Israel Medical Association
- United States Army Installation Management Agency, a predecessor to the United States Army Installation Management Command

== People ==
- Ima, a diminutive of the Russian male given name Avim
- Ima (singer) (born 1978), Canadian singer
- Ima Hogg (1882–1975), known as "The First Lady of Texas"
- Ima Winchell Stacy (1867-1923), American educator

== Places ==
- Ima Lake, a lake in Minnesota

== Technology ==
- Ideal mechanical advantage of a mechanical device
- IMA ADPCM, audio format
- .IMA, alternative file extension for IMG disk image format
- Integrated modular avionics, airborne computer network
- Integrated Motor Assist, Honda hybrid car technology
- Inverse Multiplexing for ATM, a data technology

== Other ==
- Individual Mobilization Augmentee in USAF reserve
- Ima, a praying mantids genus in Nanomantidae
