= Ava =

Ava or AVA may refer to:

== Places ==
=== Asia and Oceania ===
- Ava Kingdom, in upper Burma from 1365 to 1555
  - Inwa, formerly Ava, the capital of Ava Kingdom
  - Earl of Ava, a British colonial earldom in Burma
- Ava, Gilan, a village in Gilan Province, Iran
- Ava, North Khorasan, a city in North Khorasan Province, Iran
- Ivah or Ava, an ancient city in Assyria
- Ava railway station, in Lower Hutt, New Zealand
- IATA code for Anshun Huangguoshu Airport, China

=== United States ===
- Ava, Alabama, an unincorporated community
- Ava, Arkansas, an unincorporated community
- Ava, Illinois, a city
- Ava, Missouri, a city
- Ava, New York, a town
- Ava, Ohio, an unincorporated community
- Ava (building), a highrise in Seattle, Washington

== People ==
- Ava (given name)
- List of people with given name Ava

== Companies and organizations ==
- Aargau Verkehr AG, a transportation company based in Aargau, Switzerland.
- Academy of Vocal Arts, a Philadelphia music conservatory
- Adult Film Association of America or Adult Video Association, an American trade association for the adult sex film industry
- Agri-Food and Veterinary Authority of Singapore, a now-defunct statutory board in the Singapore government
- Amazon Valley Academy
- American Vecturist Association, an organization of transportation token collectors in the United States and Canada
- Arab Volleyball Association, a volleyball association
- Association for Volunteer Administration
- Association of Veterinary Anaesthetists, a group of people who promote the use and study of anaesthetics in veterinary medicine
- Australian Veterinary Association
- AVA Radio Company, Polish electronics firm
- AVA, the ICAO designator of the Colombian flag carrier Avianca

== Media and entertainment ==
- Ava (2017 French film)
- Ava (2017 Iranian film)
- Ava (2020 film), an American action thriller film
- AVA (TV channel), a Finnish television channel owned by MTV3
- "Ava" (Brooklyn Nine-Nine), a television episode
- AVA Recordings, a label founded by Andy Moor which focuses on melodic electronic music
- Angels & Airwaves, an American alternative rock/space rock band
- A Vacant Affair, a Singaporean metalcore band
- Alliance of Valiant Arms, a 2007 computer game
- Animator vs. Animation, a web series produced by Alan Becker

== Other uses ==
- Hurricane Ava (disambiguation), five tropical cyclones in the Eastern Pacific Ocean
- SS Ava (1855), a P&O steamship wrecked off Ceylon in 1858
- ava, the language code for the Avar language
- ʻAva, a ceremonial ritual and beverage of the Samoa Islands
- Activity vector analysis (AVA), a personality test
- American Viticultural Area, a designated wine grape-growing region in the United States
- Anthrax Vaccine Adsorbed, trade name BioThrax, an American anthrax vaccine
- Aortic valve area
- Auditory verbal agnosia, the inability to comprehend speech
