= Aventina =

Aventina may refer to:

- Aventina (given name), Russian female first name
- Aventina (moth), a synonym of the moth genus Corgatha of the family Noctuidae
