= Aveline =

Aveline is a surname of French origin, derived from a given name, a diminutive of Ava. The surname Aveline is in turn the origin of the surname and given name Evelyn.

In modern French, aveline means "a kind of big hazelnut".

== People ==
=== Surname ===
- Claude Aveline (1901–1992), French writer and poet
- Jean-Marc Aveline (born 1958), Archbishop of Marseille
- Joseph Aveline (1881–1958), French parliamentarian, mayor of Dorceau, and Percheron horse-breeder
- Pierre Aveline (1656–1722), French engraver
  - Antoine Aveline (1691–1743), French engraver, son of Pierre
  - Pierre-Alexandre Aveline (1702–1760), French engraver, son of Pierre
- William Talbot Aveline (1822–1903), British geologist and archaeologist

=== Name ===
- Aveline Fitz Peter, Countess of Essex (c. 1178–1225), English noblewoman
- Aveline de Forz, Countess of Aumale (1259–1274), English noblewoman
- Aveline de Grandpré, protagonist of Ubisoft's Assassin's Creed III: Liberation
- Aveline Kushi (1923–2001), Japanese author
- Aveline Vallen, a character in BioWare's Dragon Age II

== Other ==
- Aveline's Hole, a cave in Somerset, England
- La Fée Aveline, a French comic by René Goscinny and Coq

== See also ==
- Avelina, female first name
