= Aventinka =

Aventinka may refer to:

- Aventinka, a diminutive of the Russian male first name Aventin
- Aventinka, a diminutive of the Russian female first name Aventina
