= Avenirka =

Avenirka may refer to:

- Avenirka, a diminutive of the Russian male first name Avenir
- Avenirka, a diminutive of the Russian female first name Avenira
