= Slaven =

Slaven may refer to:

- Slaven (given name)
- Slaven (surname)
- 14708 Slaven, an asteroid
