= Aviana =

- Gender: Female

Origin
- Origin: English, Greenlandic, Hebrew, Latin
- Meaning: various, including Greenlandic “family”; or Latin “bird”

Other names
- See also: Anna, Ava, Avek, Avi, Avianna, Avis, Eva.

Aviana or Avianna is a feminine given name with multiple origins. It is a Greenlandic name, a variant of the Greenlandic name Avek, meaning "family", combined with the Greenlandic ending -na that is indicative of a first name. It has been a popular name for girls in Greenland in recent years.

It is also considered a modern English elaboration of Ava or Eva with the popular -ana or -anna ending for feminine given names in English, as in Ariana. It might also be derived from a combination of the Hebrew Avi, meaning "my father" and Anna.

The name might also be derived from avis or avian, the Latin term for "bird".

The name has been well-used for girls in recent years in the United States. Aviana was among the 1,000 most popular names for newborn girls in Canada, ranking 995th on the popularity chart, with 26 uses in 2021. Another 24 Canadian newborn girls were called Avianna in 2021. Another 13 Canadian girls were called Avyanna in 2021. The name Avianna Louise was noted as the fastest rising name for newborn girls in the Philippines in 2022. The name was used 11 times for Filipina girls in 2021 and 295 times for Filipina girls born in 2022.

== People ==
- Avianna Chao (born 1975), Chinese-born Canadian sport shooter.
