= List of astrological organizations =

This is a list of notable astrological organizations.

- American Federation of Astrologers, US
- Astrological Association of Great Britain, United Kingdom
- Faculty of Astrological Studies, United Kingdom
- Kepler College, US
- National Council for Geocosmic Research, US
- Rosicrucian Fellowship, US
- The Sophia Centre, United Kingdom
- International Association of Vedic Astrology and Numerology (IAVAN), US

== Historical ==
- Kraków School of Mathematics and Astrology (15th century), Kraków, Poland
