= Palura =

Palura is a taxonomic synonym that may refer to:

- Palura Walker, 1861 = Corgatha, a genus of moths
- Palura (G.Don) Miers = Symplocos, a genus of plants
