= Ferdinand Poni =

Albanian politician

Deputy Minister of Interior Affairs
- Incumbent
- Assumed office 2005-2007
- Preceded by: ?
- Succeeded by: Gent Strazimiri

Personal details
- Party: Democratic Party

Ferdinand Poni was the deputy Minister of Interior Affairs during 2005-2007.
