= Gent Strazimiri =

Albanian politician

Member of the Albanian parliament
- Incumbent
- Assumed office 2009

Deputy Minister of Interior Affairs
- In office 2007–2009
- Preceded by: Ferdinand Poni
- Succeeded by: Avenir Peka

Personal details
- Born: Gent Hysen Strazimiri; 6 October 1972 (age 53) Tirana, Albania
- Party: Democratic Party
- Education: University of Tirana
- Committees: Legal Affairs, Public Administration and Human Rights, Education and Public Information

Gent Hysen Strazimiri (Albanian: [ˈɡɛnt straziˈmiɾi], born 6 October 1972) was a member of the Assembly of the Republic of Albania for the Democratic Party of Albania (DP). He was Deputy Minister of Interior Affairs from 2007 to 2009. Strazimiri is also member of the committee on Legal Affairs, Public Administration and Human Rights and Committee on Education and Public Information.

Strazimiri is since 2009 the deputy leader of the DP in the Albanian parliament.

== Background ==
Strazimiri was born in Tirana, where he followed the Qemal Stafa High School. Strazimiri became a member of the DP in 1990, this was during the fall of communism in Albania. On 1992 Strazimiri finished the faculty of Law, and graduated on the University of Tirana. He entered the race with several years of political experience in the management structures of the DP and the fight against crime and trafficking in his post as Deputy Minister of Interior Affairs, which he held from 2007 until 2009. He has been from 2007 until 2009 member of the City Council of Tirana.

== Career ==
Strazimiri became a member of the DP in 1990 during the fall of communism in Albania. During 1996 and 1998 he became vice head of Forumi Rinor i Partise Demokratike (FRPD) in Tirana, and became a member of the national democratic council and of FRPD. From 1998 until 2000 he was the chairman of FRPD. In 2001 he was the spokesperson of the opposition coalition Union for Victory Coalition, which included DP, Liberal Democratic Union, Movement of Legality Party, National Front and the Republican Party of Albania. During 2002 and 2005 he was the advisor to the president of the DP. From 2005 till 2009 he was the secretary of DP, and in 2009 he was chosen as member of parliament from the voting district Tirana.

=== Deputy Minister of Interior Affairs ===
Strazimiri was Deputy Minister of Interior from 2007 to 2009 for the DP, while Bujar Nishani was Minister of Interior. Strazimiri is known for his zero tolerance against organized crime in Albania and he was one of the main forces behind a bilateral agreement to combat organized crime. This agreement was signed by Czech Interior Minister and Gent Strazimiri, leads to a higher level of cooperation between the two countries to combat narcotics trafficking, arms trafficking and human trafficking.

== Controversy ==
In May 2014 Strazimiri got into a physical confrontation with the Socialist MP-s Xhemal Qefalia and Armando Prenga, after Stazimiri had purportedly slapped Qefalia. His party claimed Prenga hit him with his belt, but Strazimiri denied that happening saying "no one dares to hit me". In July 2014 the Socialist MP Pjerin Ndreu attacked Strazimiri in the parliament, with the attack being recorded the moment of punch could be seen clearly.

In March 2016 Strazimiri got in a scuffle with the police and was also filmed holding a pistol in his back during a protest.

=== Anti-Atheist rhetoric ===
In January 2018 he made a speech in parliament stating that all believers should protest against "the party of atheists", a reference to the Socialist Party of Albania.

== Education ==
- 1987–1992 Qemal Stafa High School, Tirana
- 1992–1996 Faculty of Law, University of Tirana

== Political activity ==
Strazimiri has the following political history:

- 1990–present: Member of the DP
- 1996–1998: Vice Chairman of FRPD Tirana
- 1996–1998: Member of National Council and the Board of FRPD
- 1998–2000: Member of National Council and the Board of ADP
- 1998–2000: Chairman of the FRPD
- 2001: Spokesperson of the Coalition "Union for Victory"
- 2002–2005: Advisor to the President of the DPA
- 2005–2009: Member of the National Council of the DP
- 2005–2009: Secretary of the DP
- 2007–2009: Member of the City Council of Tirana
- 2007–2009: Deputy Minister of Interior Affairs
- 2009–present: Member of the Albanian Parliament
- 2009-2013: Deputy-Leader of DP group in Parliament
- 2013–present: Secretary of the DP
