= Corgatha albivertex =

Scientific classification
- Kingdom: Animalia
- Phylum: Arthropoda
- Class: Insecta
- Order: Lepidoptera
- Superfamily: Noctuoidea
- Family: Erebidae
- Genus: Corgatha
- Species: C. albivertex

Binomial name
- Corgatha albivertex Hampson, 1907

Species of moth

Corgatha albivertex is a moth of the family Noctuidae first described by George Hampson in 1907. It is found in Sri Lanka.
