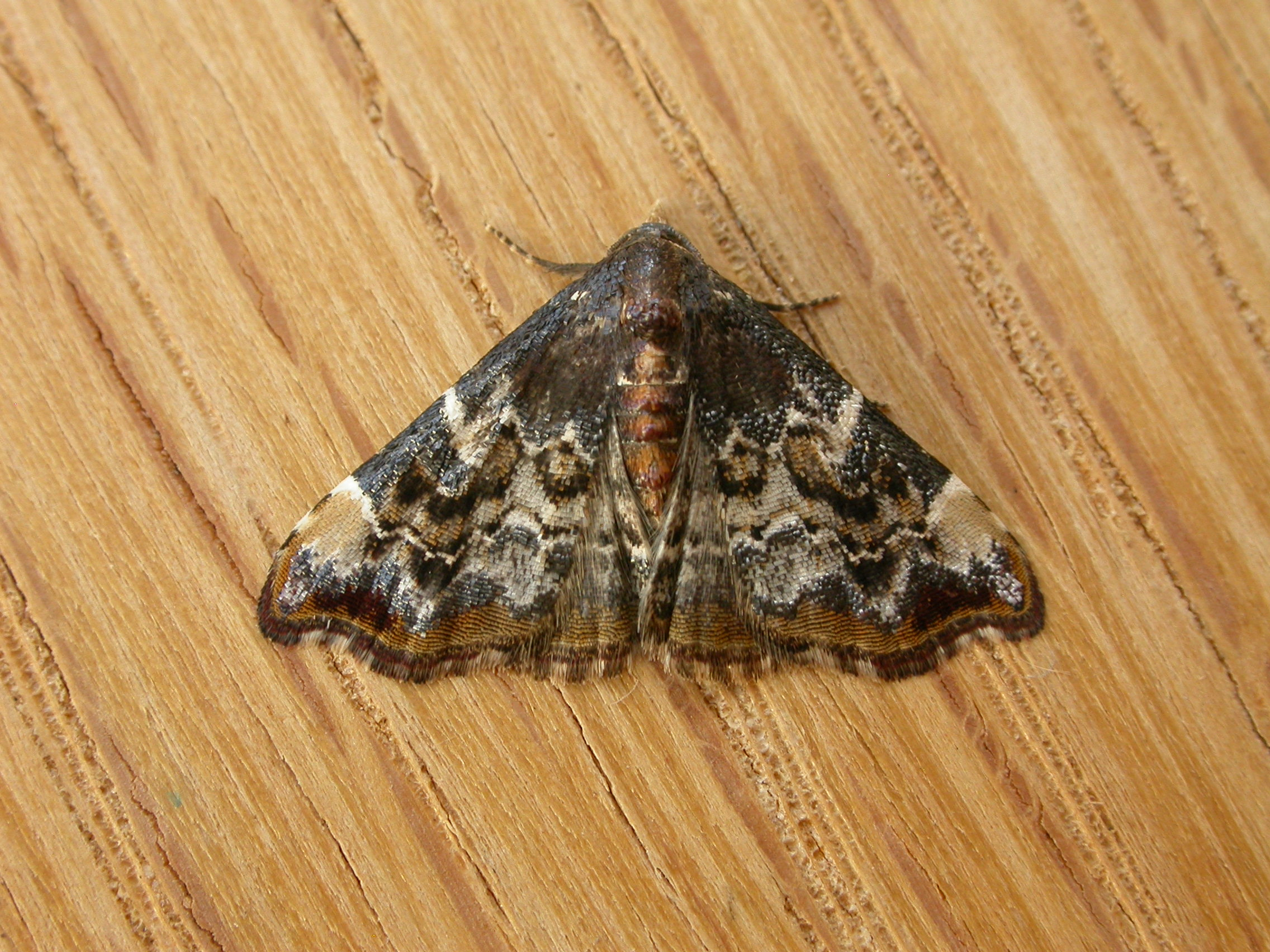

Scientific classification
- Domain: Eukaryota
- Kingdom: Animalia
- Phylum: Arthropoda
- Class: Insecta
- Order: Lepidoptera
- Superfamily: Noctuoidea
- Family: Erebidae
- Genus: Corgatha
- Species: C. sideropasta

Binomial name
- Corgatha sideropasta Turner, 1936

= Corgatha sideropasta =

Species of moth in Australia

The Brown Hookwing, Corgatha sideropasta, previously known as Metasada sideropasta, is a species of moth of the family Erebidae. It is found in Australia and has a wingspan of 2cm.
