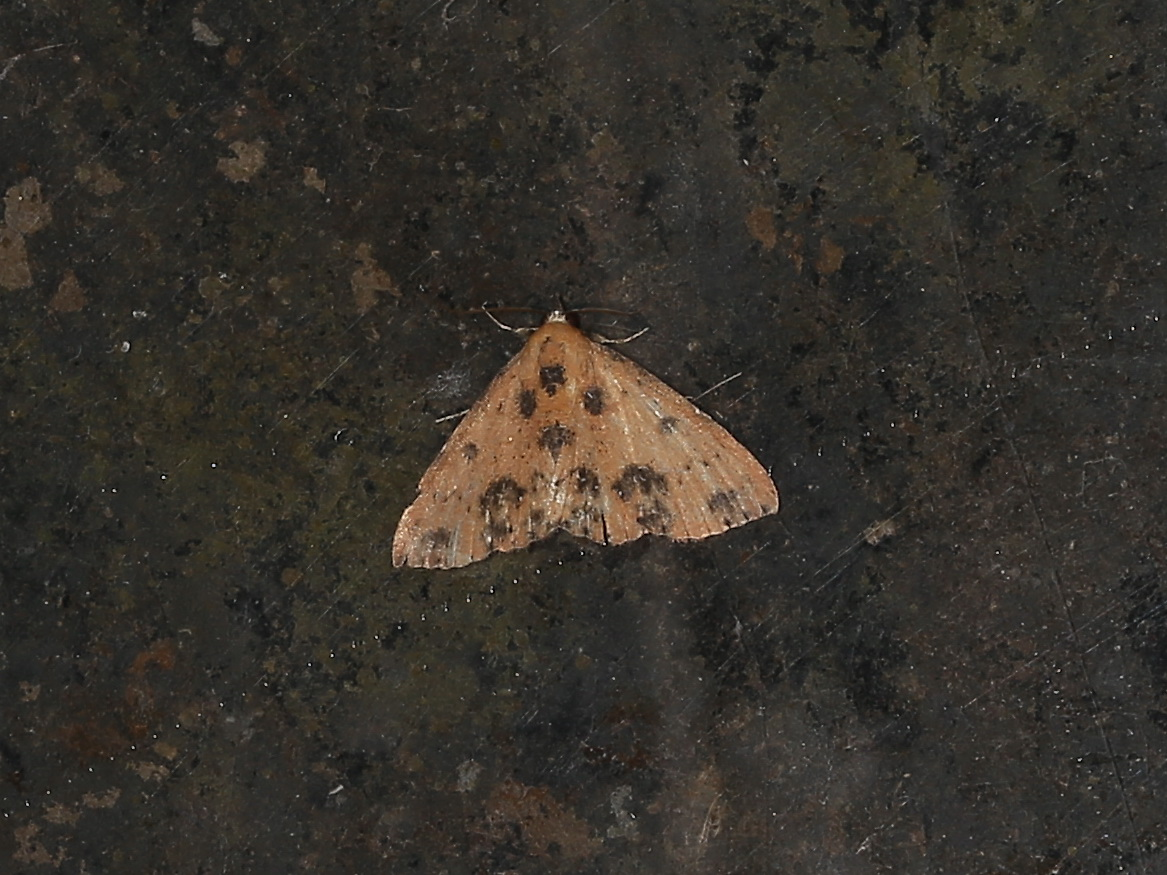

Scientific classification
- Kingdom: Animalia
- Phylum: Arthropoda
- Class: Insecta
- Order: Lepidoptera
- Superfamily: Noctuoidea
- Family: Erebidae
- Genus: Corgatha
- Species: C. semipardata

Binomial name
- Corgatha semipardata (Walker, 1862)

Synonyms
- Guriauna semipardata Walker, 1862; Thermesia nigripalpis Walker, 1864; Corgatha castanea Hampson, 1896; Corgatha bipunctata Bethune-Baker, 1906; Capnodes griseiplaga Bethune-Baker, 1908; Metasada pleurosticta Turner, 1936

= Corgatha semipardata =

Species of moth

Corgatha semipardata is a species of moth of the family Erebidae. It is found in Borneo and Peninsular Malaysia.
