= Slavens =

Slavens is a given and surname. Notable people with the name include:

== Middle Name ==
- William Slavens McNutt (1885-1938), American screenwriter

== Surname ==
- Dian Slavens (born 1958), American politician
- J. Paul Slavens (born 1962), American musician
- James W. L. Slavens (1838–1905), American businessman and politician
- Mark Slavens (born 1954), American politician; husband of Dian
- Pēteris Slavens (1874-1919), Latvian Soviet military commander
- Samuel Slavens (c.1830-1862), American Civil War soldier

== See also ==
- Slaven (given name)
- Slaven (surname)
