= Corgatha subindicata =

Scientific classification
- Kingdom: Animalia
- Phylum: Arthropoda
- Class: Insecta
- Order: Lepidoptera
- Superfamily: Noctuoidea
- Family: Erebidae
- Genus: Corgatha
- Species: C. subindicata

Binomial name
- Corgatha subindicata Kenrick, 1917

Species of moth

Corgatha subindicata is a species of moth of the family Erebidae. It was described by George Hamilton Kenrick in 1917 and is found in Madagascar.

It has a wingspan of approximately 28 mm.

== See also ==
- List of moths of Madagascar
