= Ave (given name) =

Female given name

- Gender: Unisex, female (Estonia)
- Name day: 31 July (Estonia)

Origin
- Origin: Angelical salutation
- Meaning: Greetings
- Region of origin: Angolophone regions, Estonia

Other names
- Related names: Ava, Eve, Avea

Ave is a female given name meaning "angelical salutation": (in the heavenly books, Ave is a greeting and farewell that angels used on prophets, one of which was Gabriel's greeting: "Ave Maria" to The Virgin Mary). Ave is also an Estonian feminine given name.

As of 1 January 2021, 1,526 women in Estonia have the first name Ave, making it the 120th most popular female name in the country. The name is most commonly found in Pärnu County, where 16.93 per 10,000 women bear the name. Notable people bearing the name Ave include:

- Ave Alavainu (1942–2022), poet
- Ave-Lii Laas (born 1999), footballer
- Ave Laanoja (born 1948), actress
- Ave Pajo (born 1984), footballer
- Ave Suija (born 1969), lichenologist
