= Corgatha zonalis =

Scientific classification
- Kingdom: Animalia
- Phylum: Arthropoda
- Class: Insecta
- Order: Lepidoptera
- Superfamily: Noctuoidea
- Family: Erebidae
- Genus: Corgatha
- Species: C. zonalis

Binomial name
- Corgatha zonalis Walker, [1859]

Synonyms
- Ausinza aequa Walker, 1864

Species of moth

Corgatha zonalis is a moth of the family Erebidae first described by Francis Walker in 1859. It is found in Oriental tropics of India and from Sri Lanka to Borneo, the Philippines and Japan.
