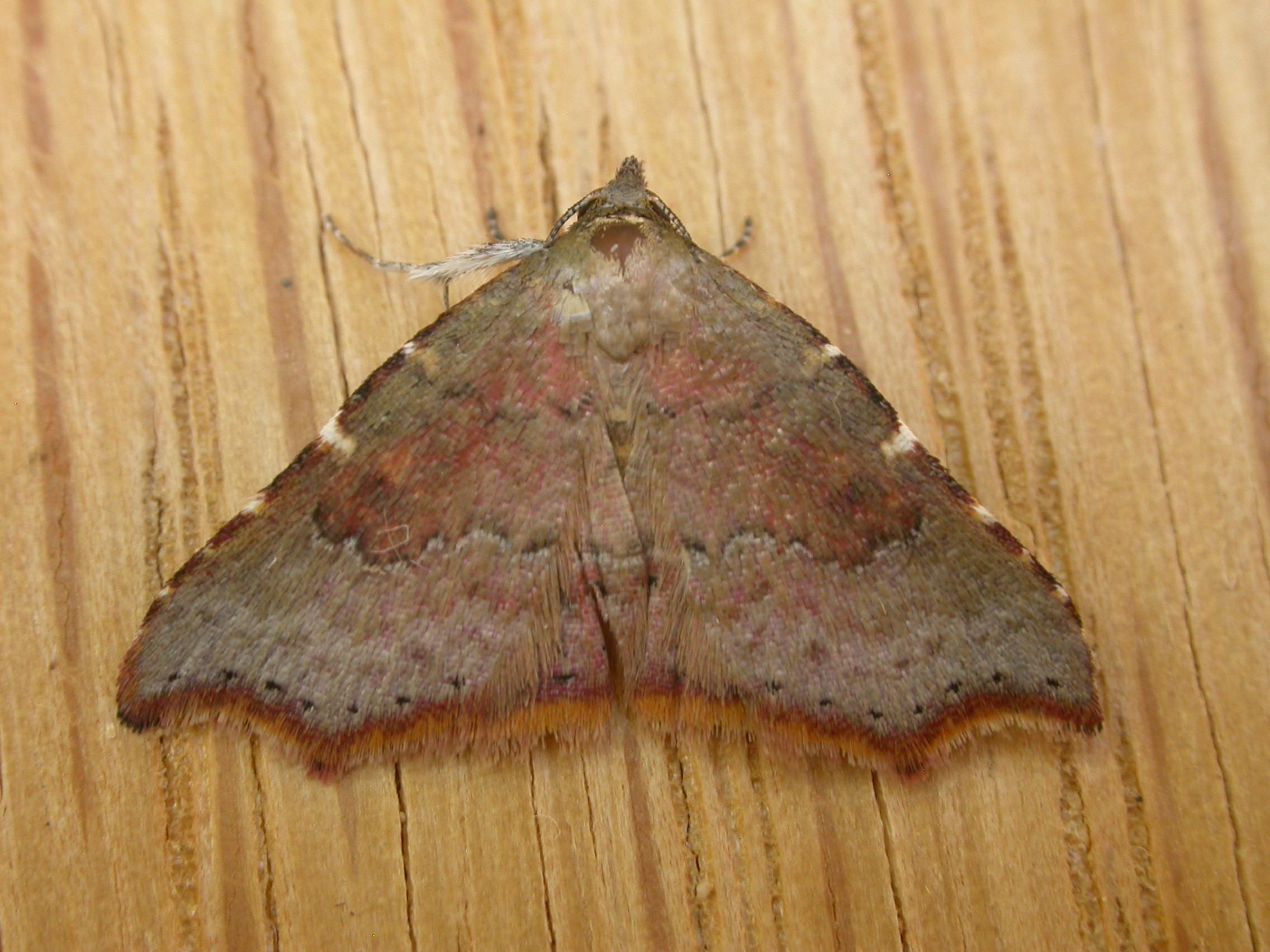

Scientific classification
- Domain: Eukaryota
- Kingdom: Animalia
- Phylum: Arthropoda
- Class: Insecta
- Order: Lepidoptera
- Superfamily: Noctuoidea
- Family: Erebidae
- Genus: Corgatha
- Species: C. dipyra

Binomial name
- Corgatha dipyra Turner, 1902

= Corgatha dipyra =

Species of moth

Corgatha dipyra is a species of moth of the family Erebidae. It is found in Australia.

The adult moth of this species has brown wings with submarginal lines and arcs of dark spots. The wingspan is about 1.5 cm.
