= Slavena =

- Gender: female

Origin
- Origin: Slavic
- Meaning: slava ("glory, fame") or ("Slavic woman")

Other names
- Variant form: Slaven (m)

Slavena (pronounced slah-vyeh-nah) is a feminine given name of Slavic origin meaning 'Slavic woman' or 'fame, glory'. The short form is Slávka and variants are Sláva, Slavinka, Slavenka, Vena. The masculine form is Slaven.

The name days are (Czech) 12 February and (Slovene) 31 December.

== People with the name ==
- Slavka Atanasijević (1850–1897), Serbian pianist and composer
- Slávka Budínová (1924–2002), Czech actress
- Slavenka Drakulić (born 1949), Croatian journalist, novelist and essayist
- Slavka Drašković, Serbian government official and writer
- Slávka Frniaková (born 1979), Slovak basketball player
- Slávka Halčáková (born 1974), Slovak actress
- Slavka Kohout (born 1932), American figure skating coach
- Slavka Maneva (1934–2010), Macedonian writer and poet
- Slavka Ouzounova (born 1971), Bulgarian volleyball player
- Slavena Vatova (born 1989), Bulgarian model

== See also ==
- 2821 Slávka, a minor planet named after Sláva Vávrová, the discoverer's mother
- Slavic names
