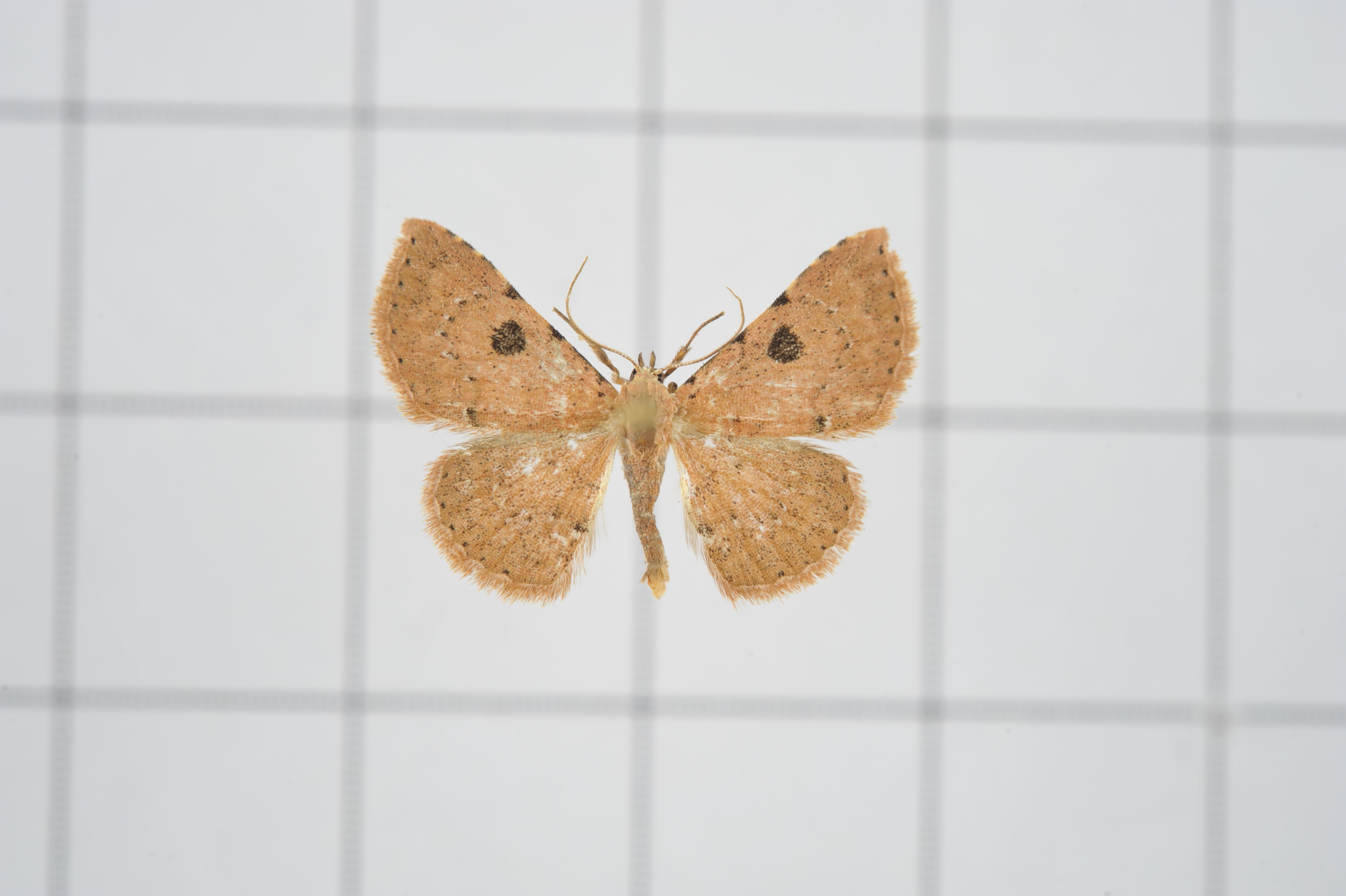

Scientific classification
- Kingdom: Animalia
- Phylum: Arthropoda
- Class: Insecta
- Order: Lepidoptera
- Superfamily: Noctuoidea
- Family: Erebidae
- Genus: Corgatha
- Species: C. trichogyia

Binomial name
- Corgatha trichogyia (Hampson, 1907)

= Corgatha trichogyia =

Species of moth

Corgatha trichogyia is a moth of the family Erebidae first described by George Hampson in 1907. It is found in Sri Lanka.
