= Corgatha minor =

Scientific classification
- Domain: Eukaryota
- Kingdom: Animalia
- Phylum: Arthropoda
- Class: Insecta
- Order: Lepidoptera
- Superfamily: Noctuoidea
- Family: Erebidae
- Genus: Corgatha
- Species: C. minor

Binomial name
- Corgatha minor (Moore, [1885])

Synonyms
- Capnodes minor Moore, [1885]

Species of moth

Corgatha minor is a moth of the family Noctuidae first described by Frederic Moore in 1885. It is found in Sri Lanka.
