= Aibhilín =

- Pronunciation: Irish: [ˈavʲlʲiːnʲ]
- Gender: female

Aibhilín is the Irish form of the Norman name Aveline (anglicized Evelyn).

== People ==
- Aibhilín Ní Uidhir, died 1498
- Aibhilín Ní Neill, died 1508
- Aibhilín Ní Uiginn, 1510
- Aibhilín Ní Ridire an Glenna, died 1524
- Aibhilín Ní Domhnaill, died 1549
- Aibhilín Níc Carthaigh, died 1560
- Aibhilín Ní Roste, died 1583

== See also ==
- List of Irish-language given names
