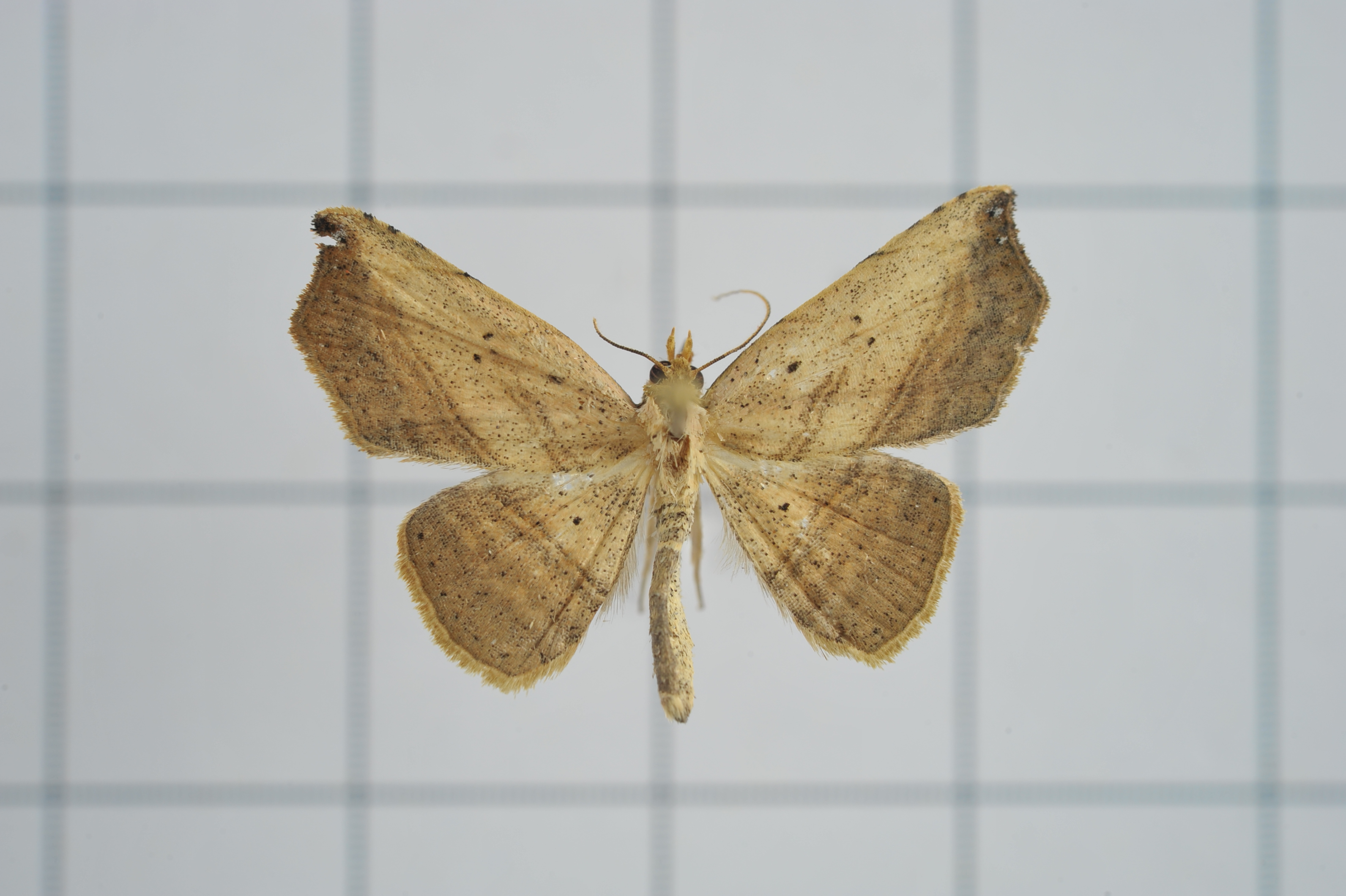

Scientific classification
- Domain: Eukaryota
- Kingdom: Animalia
- Phylum: Arthropoda
- Class: Insecta
- Order: Lepidoptera
- Superfamily: Noctuoidea
- Family: Erebidae
- Genus: Corgatha
- Species: C. atrifalcis

Binomial name
- Corgatha atrifalcis Hampson, 1907

= Corgatha atrifalcis =

Species of moth

Corgatha atrifalcis is a moth in the family Erebidae. It is found in Sri Lanka.
