= Pierre-Alexandre Aveline =

French engraver, portraitist, illustrator and printmaker

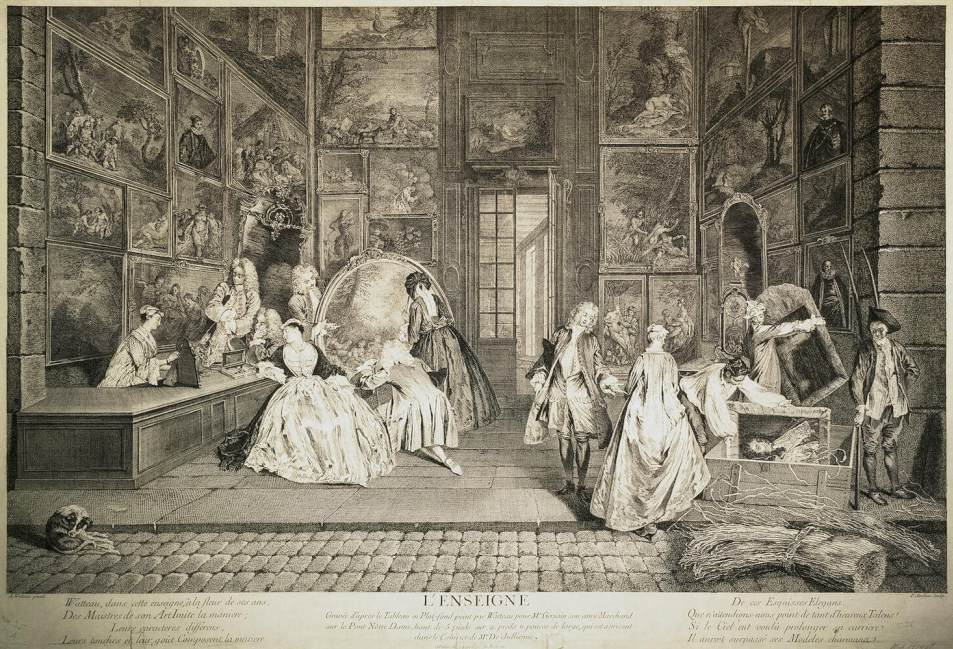
L'Enseigne de Gersaint, after Antoine Watteau, 1732, Hermitage Museum, Saint-Petersburg

Pierre-Alexandre Aveline (1702–1760) was a French engraver, portraitist, illustrator, and printmaker.

== Biography ==
Aveline was born in Paris into a family of artists, including his father Pierre Aveline and brother Antoine Aveline. In 1737 he joined the Académie de peinture et de sculpture (Royal Academy of Painting and Sculpture) in Paris. He primarily worked with copperplate in his engraving. He is best known for his reproductions of other artists' works. For example, The Signboard of the Gersaint Gallery is a reproduction of L'Enseigne de Gersaint by Antoine Watteau.
