= Ad Fontes Academy =

Private Christian school in Virginia, US

- Centreville, Virginia; United States

Information
- Type: Private, Classical Christian
- Established: 1996
- Head of school: Karen Dougherty
- Grades: K–12
- Campus: Centreville Presbyterian Church
- Colors: Burgundy and navy
- Mascot: Falcon
- Accreditation: Association of Classical and Christian Schools
- Website: www.adfontes.com

Ad Fontes Academy (AFA) is an independent, private, classical Christian school in Centreville, Virginia. AFA teaches kindergarten through high-school (K–12) classes. AFA is accredited by the Association of Classical and Christian Schools (ACCS). AFA operates under the nonprofit 501(c)(3) Ad Fontes Educational Trust. Its campus is located at Centreville Presbyterian Church.

== History ==
When Ad Fontes Academy opened in September 1996, it started with 8 students in grades 9–10. AFA graduated its first class of five seniors in June 1999. In 2000, AFA added grades 7 and 8 to the high school program. In 2003, kindergarten was added and grades 1 to 6 the following year for a full K-12 program.

== Teaching methodology ==
The teaching methodology is based on Dorothy Sayers’ essay, The Lost Tools of Learning. The teachers further utilize the methods in John Milton Gregory's book The Seven Laws of Teaching.

== Upper school student life ==
=== Sports ===
==== Boys ====
- Basketball
- Flag Football
- Soccer

==== Girls ====
- Volleyball

==== Boys and girls ====
- Cross Country
- Tennis

AFA is a member of the Northern Virginia Independent Athletic Conference (NVIAC)

=== Clubs ===
- Art Club
- Book Club
- Chess Club
- Choir Club
- Cooking Club
- Craft Club
- Play Reading Club
- Sports Club
- Tennis Club
- Yearbook Club

=== Other activities ===
- Annual Fall Student Retreat
- House System
- Protocol (Autumn Ball)
- Shakespeare play
- Spirit Night (monthly)
- Spring Dance
- Themed Feast Days
