= Atrial Fibrillation Association =

International atrial fibrillation charity

- Formation: 2007

The AF Association (AF–A) is an international charity that provides information and support for patients suspected of having, or diagnosed with atrial fibrillation (AF); the most common heart rhythm disorder. The AF Association also works to campaign for greater awareness of AF amongst the general public and increase education for healthcare professionals and service providers involved in the management of AF.

== History ==
In 2007, the AF-A was founded by Mrs Trudie Lobban MBE, Professor A John Camm, Professor Richard Schilling and Consultant Arrhythmia Nurse Mrs Jayne Mudd. The charity was formed after requests from arrhythmia patients seeking reliable information and support about this heart rhythm disorder.

The charity partners with Arrhythmia Alliance (A-A) to facilitate educational meetings and symposia for healthcare professionals, including sessions at the annual Heart Rhythm Congress.

== Aims and objectives ==
1. The AF Association's primary objective is to provide reliable information to individuals affected by AF. All publications are medically approved and those developed for the UK are endorsed by the Department of Health.
2. The AF Association provides support though email and a telephone support line, the latter being available 24/7. The patient focused website provides downloadable factsheets and information booklets as well as free access to current world-wide AF news, fellow patient case stories and links to online interactive and moderated forums.
3. The AF Association works to raise awareness of AF amongst the general public and lobby for screening for AF through the Know Your Pulse campaign.
4. The AF Association seeks to make AF a health priority, which is supported by the All Party Parliamentary Group on AF (APGAF), chaired by Glyn Davies MP.

== Activity ==
Know Your Pulse - Since 2009 the AF Association has been campaigning for manual pulse checks to be included in all routine medical checkups carried out by the NHS in England. A manual pulse check is one of the easiest ways to detect a cardiac arrhythmia, which otherwise may go untreated until a stroke occurs.

Heart Rhythm Week - in collaboration with Arrhythmia Alliance. Held annually during the first week of June this event involves extensive activities with individuals, groups, medical centres and celebrities focused on raising awareness and greater understanding of AF.

Sign Against Stroke - patient organisations from twenty countries produced the Global Atrial Fibrillation Charter. Launched 2012, the aim of the charter is to turn the world's attention to atrial fibrillation and AF-related stroke.

In 2011 an All-Party Parliamentary Group on atrial fibrillation (APGAF) was established in partnership with the AF Association. It is chaired by Glyn Davies MP, who is himself affected by AF.
