= Avenir Sumin =

Russian artist

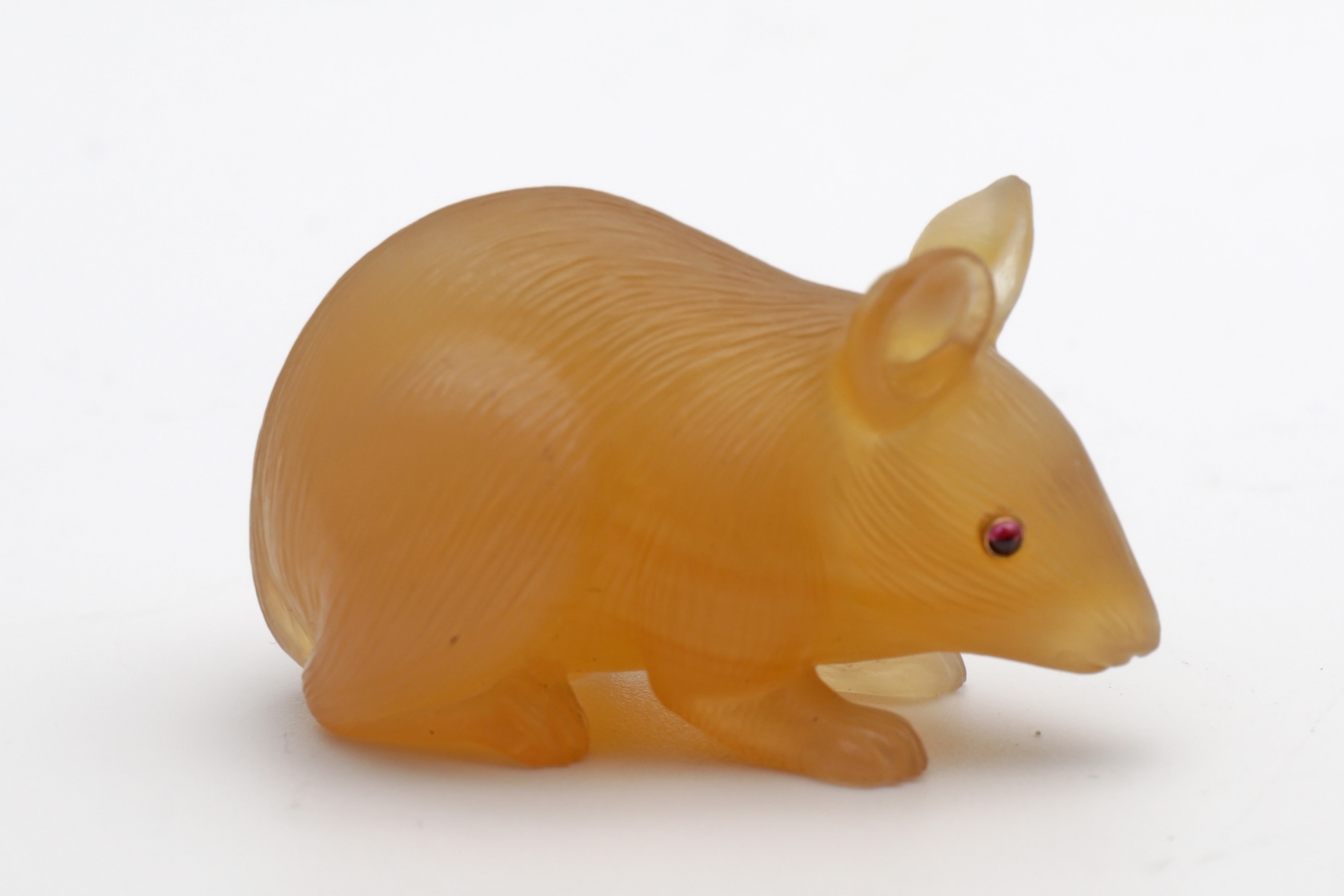
Sumin chalcedony mouse

Avenir Ivanovich Sumin (Russian: Авенир Иванович Сумин; 1869–1913) was a competitor of the Fabergé's art in St. Petersburg as a "Supplier to the Court". His workshop was founded by his father, Ivan Sumin, in 1869.

== Additional sources ==
- G.von Habsburg-Lothringen & A.von Solodkoff, Fabergé - Court Jeweler to the Tsars (1979) ISBN 0-914427-09-1
- Geoffrey Watts, Russian Silversmiths' Hallmarks (1700 to 1917) (2006)
- М.М. Постникова-Лосева, Н.Г.П. Платонова, Б.Л. Ульяноа, ЗОЛОТОЕ И СЕРЕБРЯНОЕ ДЕЛО XV-XX вв. (2003)
