= Ivah =

Ivah (or Ava) was a city in Assyria, it lies on the Euphrates river between the cities of Sepharvaim and Henah. Meaning: overturning.

- 2 Kings 17:24, 18:34 and 19:13 it is mentioned in a group of cities regarding the Assyrian Gods whose gods did not rescue Samaria.

Ivah has also been thought to have been the Ahava in Ezra 8:15.

It is also the name of a district in Babylon.
