= Saint-Aventin =

- Commune
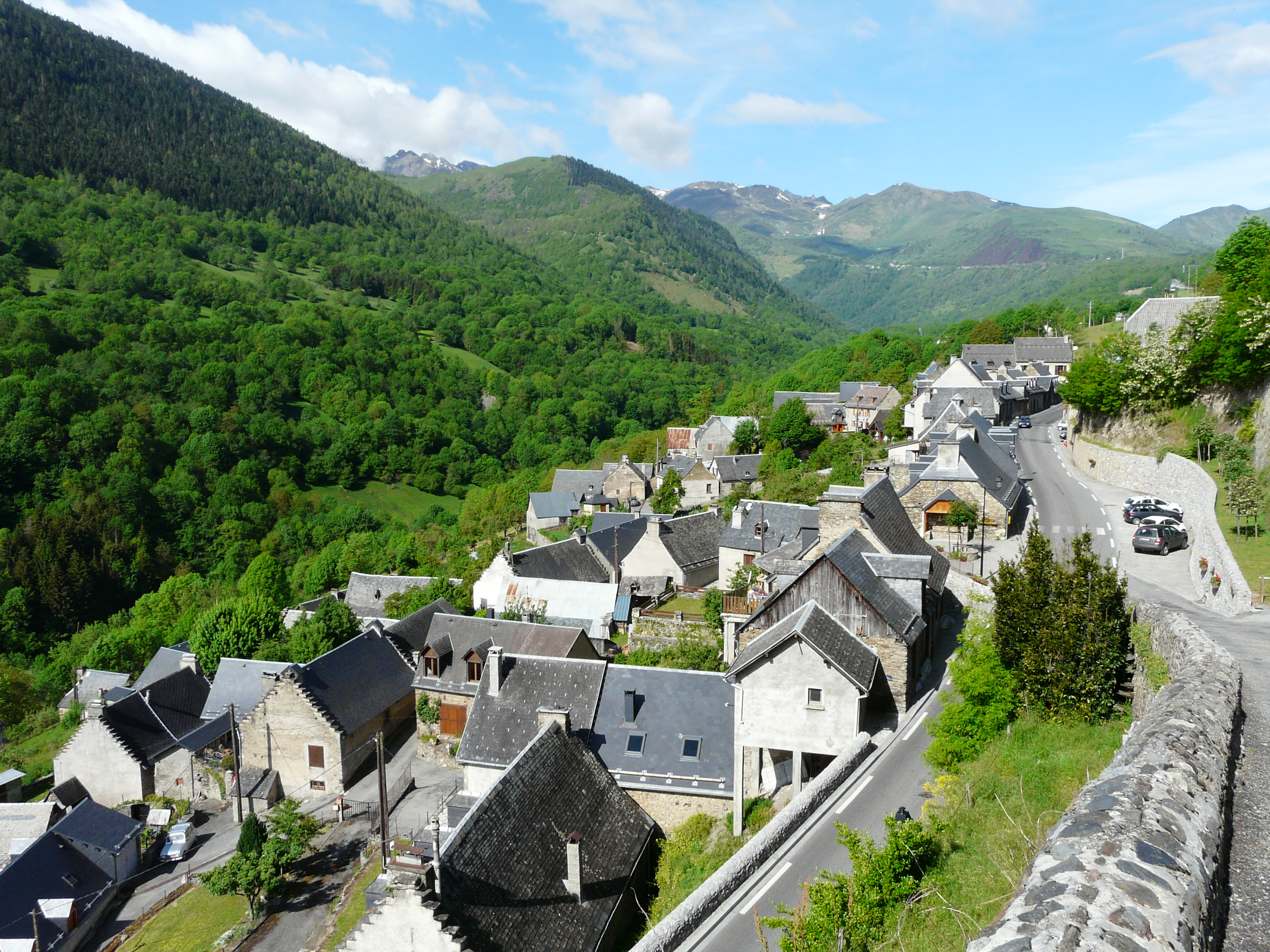
- A general view of Saint-Aventin

- Coat of arms
- Location of Saint-Aventin
- Location within France Location within Occitanie
- Coordinates: 42°48′26″N 0°32′49″E
- Country: France
- Region: Occitania
- Department: Haute-Garonne
- Arrondissement: Saint-Gaudens
- Canton: Bagnères-de-Luchon

Government
  - Mayor (2020–2026): Jean-Claude Tiné
- Area^{1}: 17.4 km^{2} (6.7 sq mi)
- Elevation: 929 m (3,048 ft)
- Highest elevation: 2,676 m (8,780 ft)
- Lowest elevation: 679 m (2,228 ft)
- Population (2023): 69
  - Density: 4.0/km^{2} (10/sq mi)
- Time zone: UTC+01:00 (CET)
  - Summer (DST): UTC+02:00 (CEST)
- INSEE/Postal code: 31470 /31110
- ^{1} French Land Register data, which excludes lakes, ponds, glaciers > 1 km^{2} (0.386 sq mi or 247 acres) and river estuaries.

Saint-Aventin is a commune in the Haute-Garonne department in southwestern France.

The commune of Saint-Aventin is located in the heart of the Pyrenees, and extends from the Larboust Valley in the north to the Spanish border in the south. The highest point is the Sacroux peek at 2,676 metres. The municipal territory hosts the Luchon-Superbagnères winter sports facilities, accessible only from Bagnères-de-Luchon by road or Cable car. The village of Saint-Aventin, is located in the Larboust Valley, 52 km south of Saint-Gaudens and 5 km west of Bagnères-de-Luchon. The population density is 5.3per/km²

== Population ==
Historical population

Year	Pop.	±% p.a.
1793	242	—
1821	340	+1.22%
1846	415	+0.80%
1872	325	−0.94%
1901	283	−0.48%
1926	224	−0.93%
1946	195	−0.69%
1962	128	−2.60%
1968	155	+3.24%

Year	Pop.	±% p.a.
1975	149	−0.56%
1982	115	−3.63%
1990	98	−1.98%
1999	95	−0.34%
2007	89	−0.81%
2012	96	+1.53%
2017	80	−3.58%
2023	69	−2.44%

Source: EHESS and INSEE (1968-2023)

== Landmarks ==
- Luchon-Superbagnères
- La chapelle de Saint-Aventin.
- La vallée du Lis (ou du Lys).

=== Gallery ===
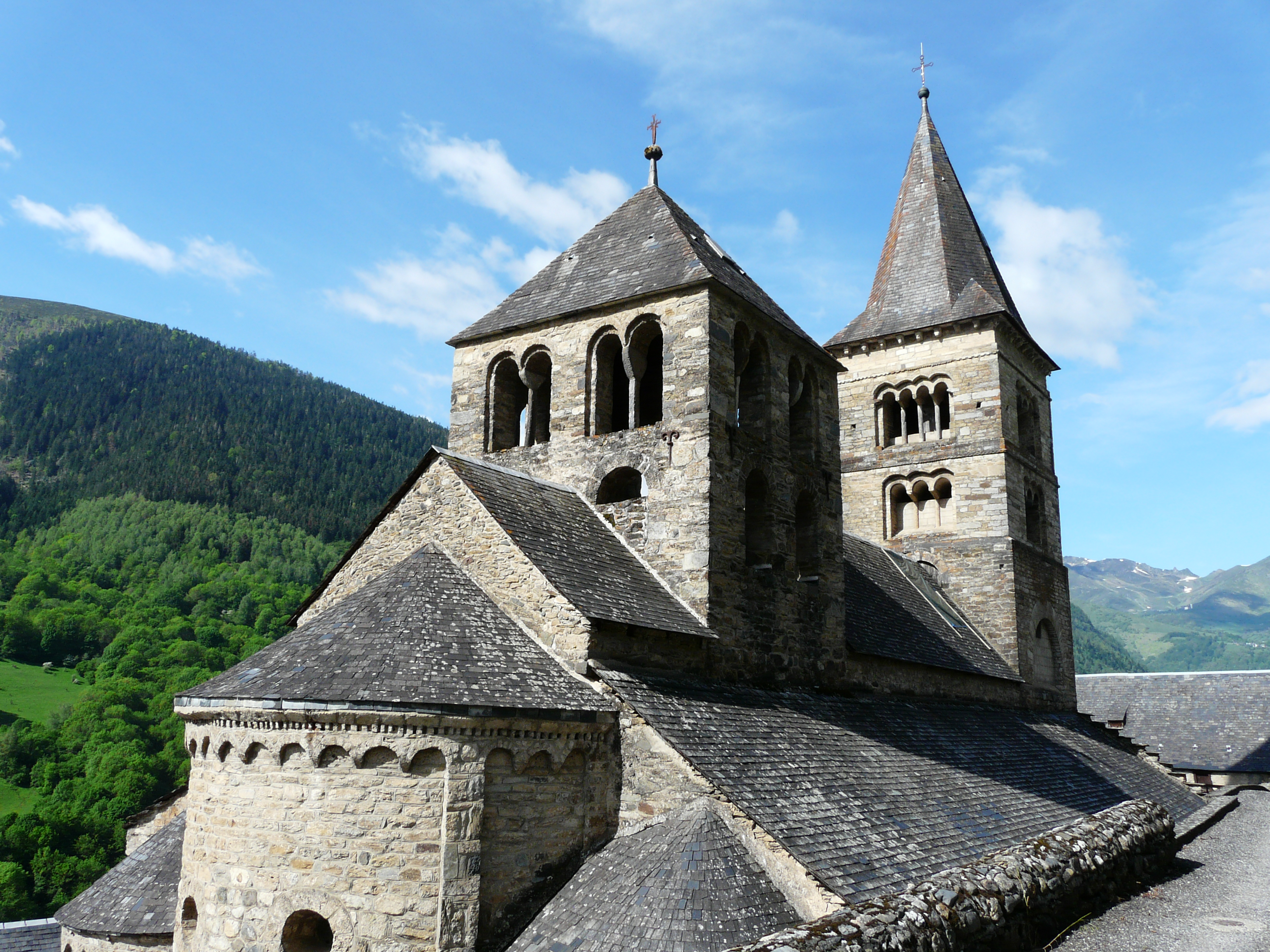
church of Saint-Aventin.

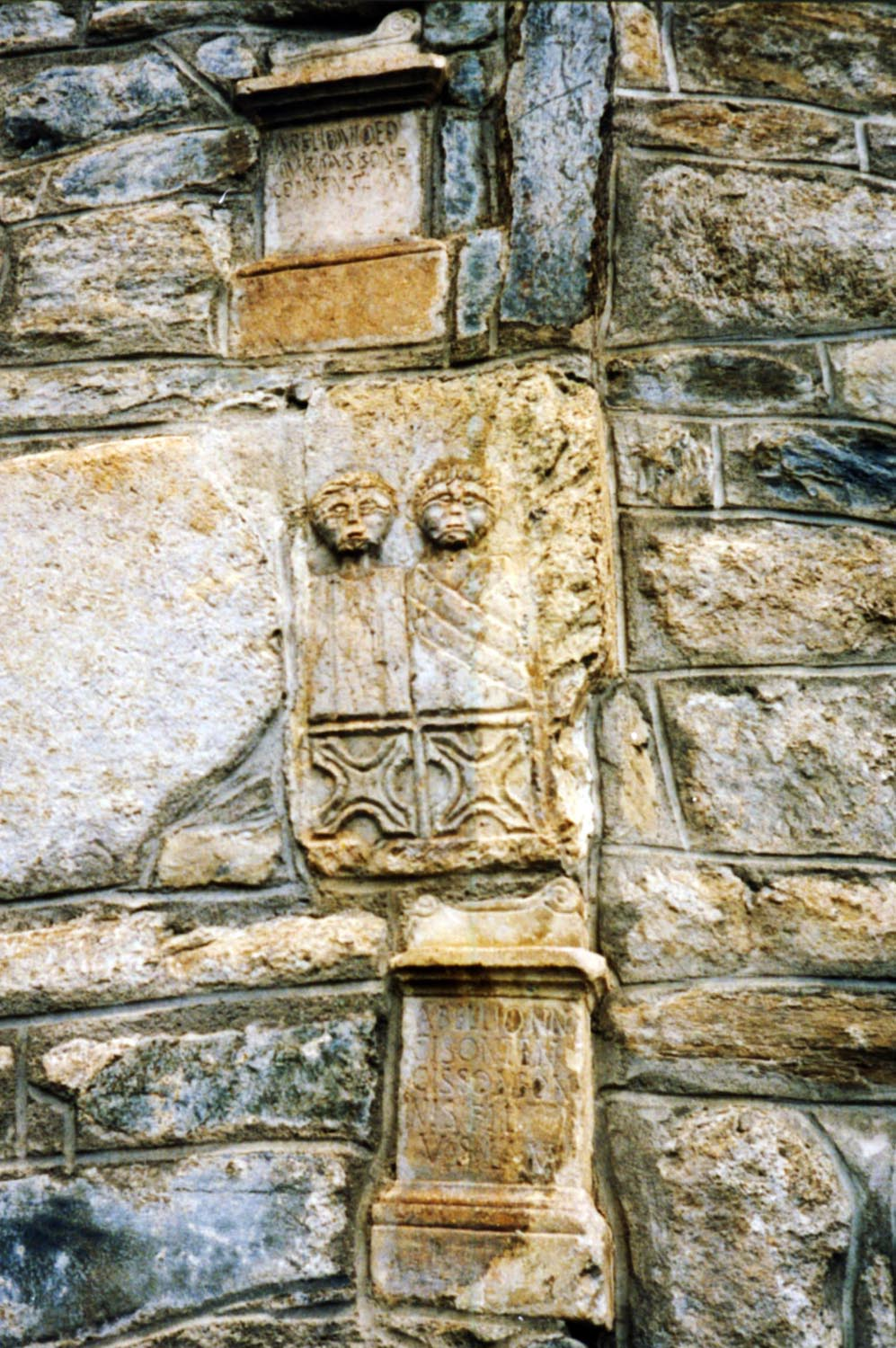
Deux autels au dieu Abellio encadrant le cippe funéraire d'un couple.

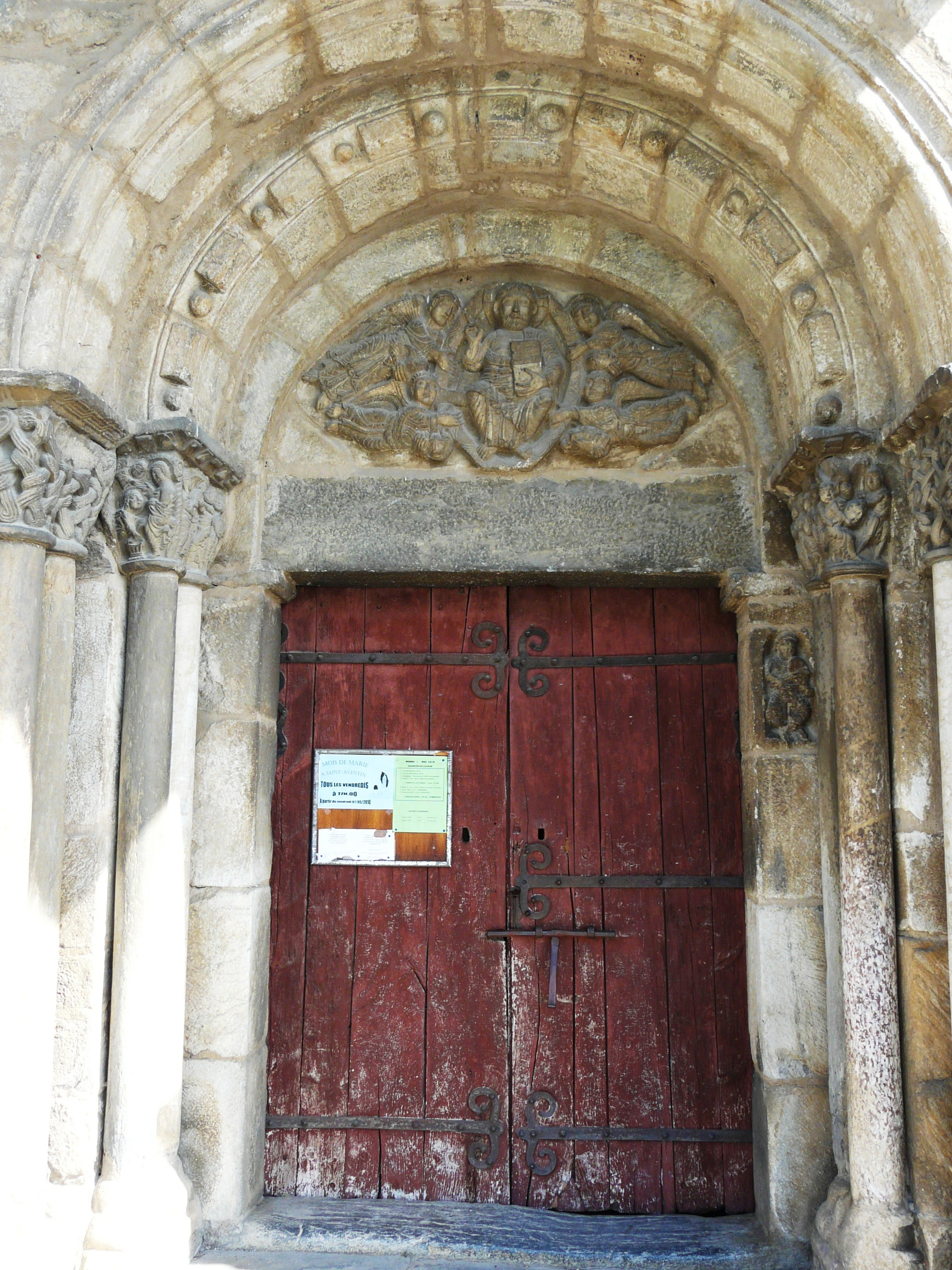
Le portail de l'église.

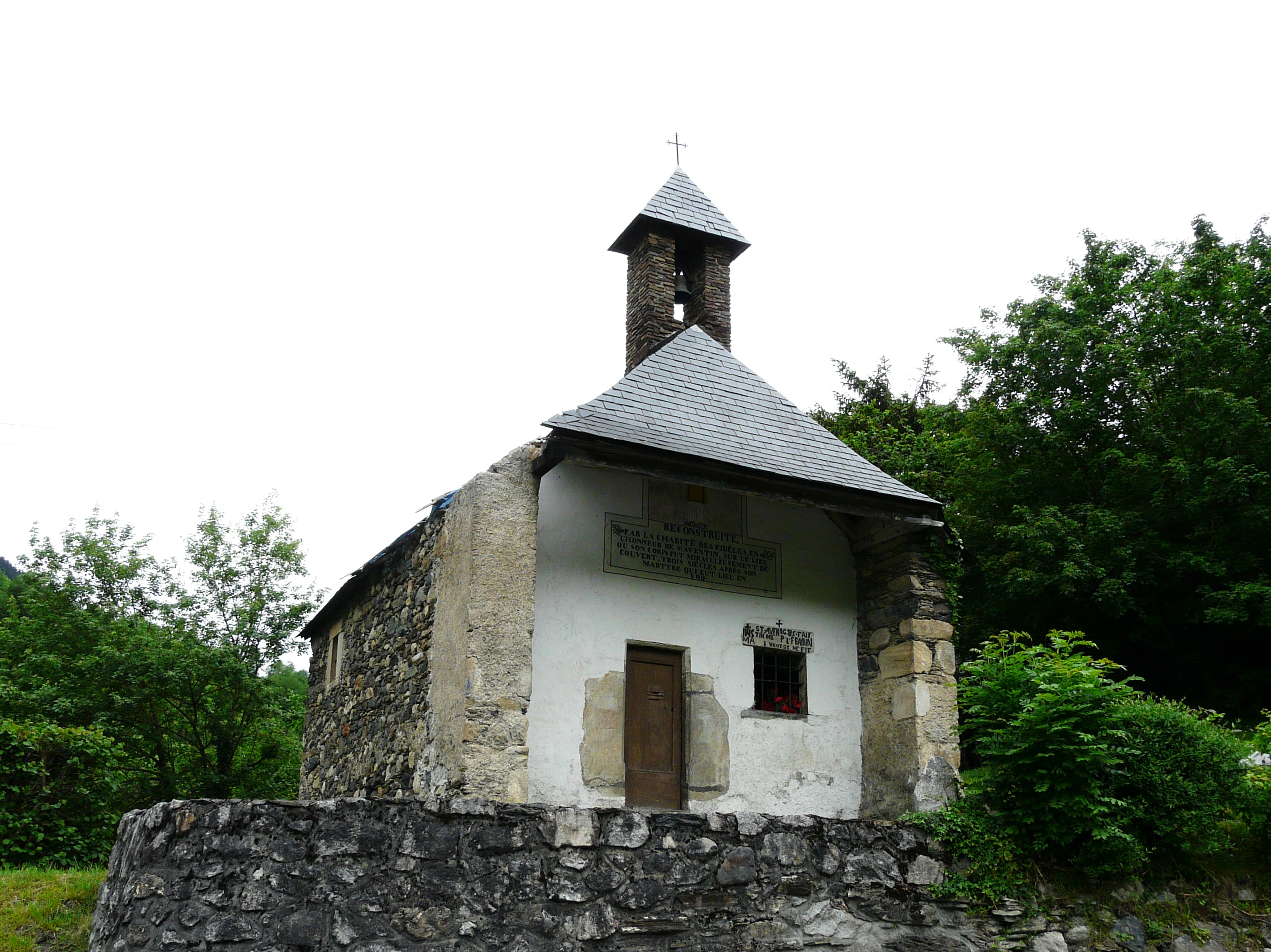
La chapelle de Saint-Aventin.

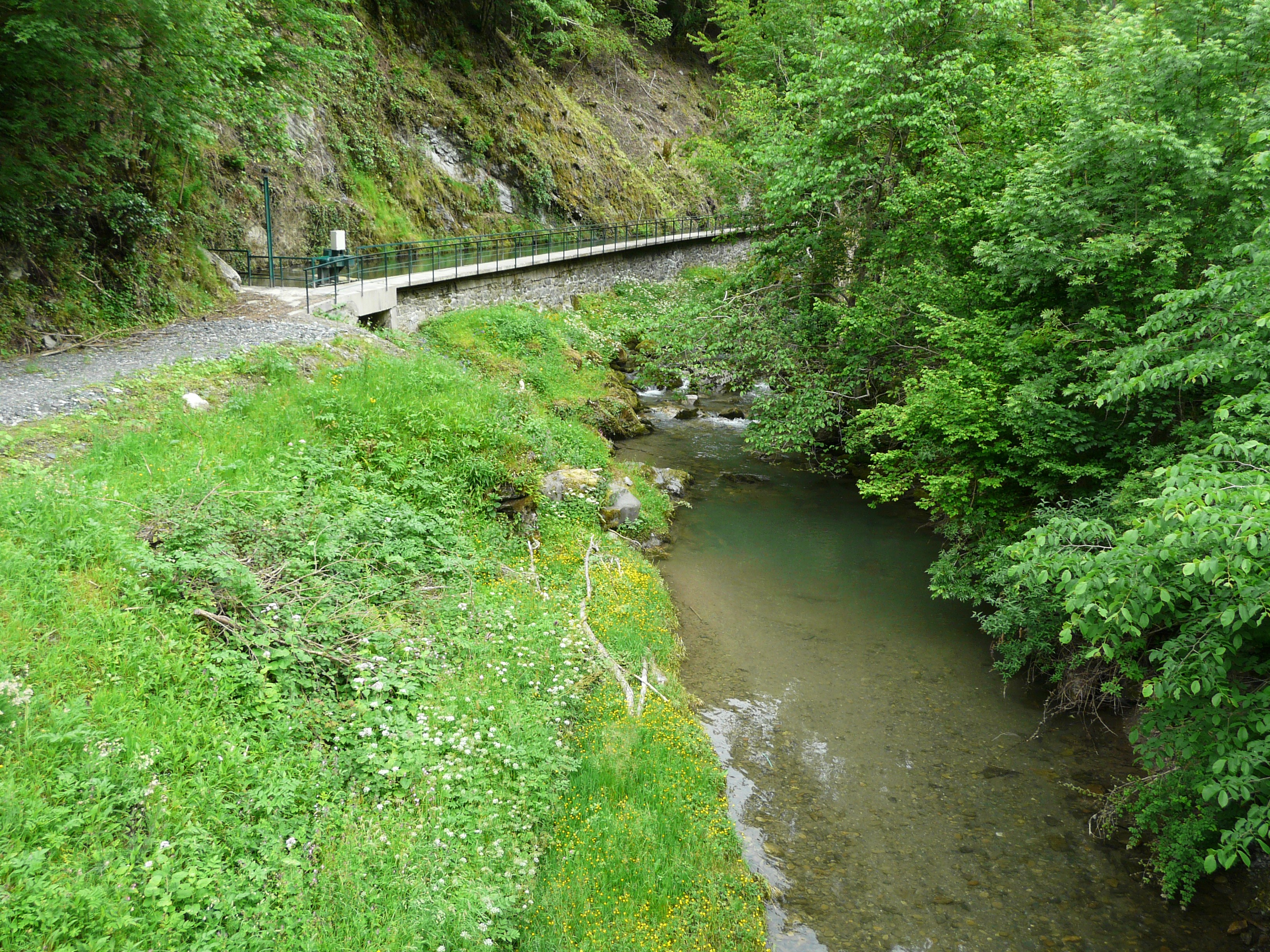
L'One au pont de Miey.

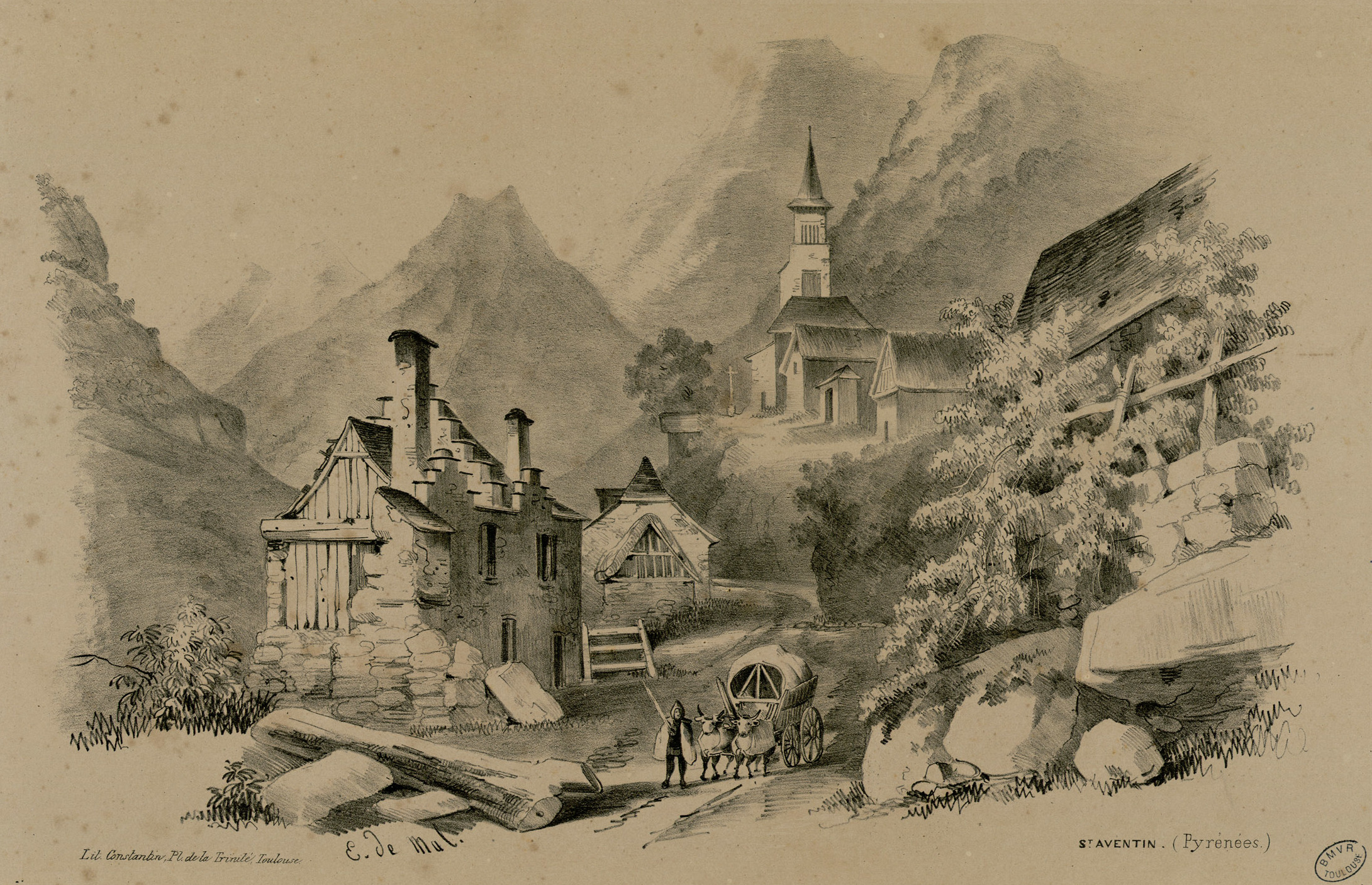
Saint-Aventin near 1840, by Eugène de Malbos.

=== Saint Aventin Church ===
The Romanesque church of Saint-Aventin dates from the 11th or 12th century, has two bell towers, a porch decorated with sculptures, and capitals showing scenes of the life and martyrdom of saint Aventin.
The exterior walls have incorporated stone from previous buildings that reuse of stelae and pagan altars dedicated to Pyrenean gods, including Abellio and Aherbelst. Inside the church are monumental paintings, a baptismal font and a wrought iron altar. The Church has been classified historical monument since 1840.

== See also ==
- Communes of the Haute-Garonne department
