= Illinois Mycological Association =

American group of mushroom enthusiasts

- Illinois Mycological Association logo
- Abbreviation: IMA
- Predecessor: Illinois Mycological Society
- Formation: 1973; 53 years ago
- Founder: Marcia Mau
- Founded at: Chicago
- Type: NGO
- Purpose: mycology
- Region served: Illinois
- President: Liz Weinstein
- Scientific Advisor: Patrick Leacock
- Program Chair: Kate Golembiewski
- Secretary: Gino Albert
- Publication: Fungus Friends
- Parent organization: North American Mycological Association
- Website: www.illinoismyco.org

The Illinois Mycological Association or IMA is a group of mushroom enthusiasts, citizen scientists, foragers, and professional mycologists based in the Chicago area.

== Overview ==
Meetings are held monthly, except in some winter months, at the Niles Historical & Cultural Center. Originally meetings were held at the Field Museum of Natural History, and later at North Park Village Nature Center, both in Chicago. The meetings usually include a lecture from a professional mycologist or author and are free and open to the public. However, only members can attend the mushroom forays, or hunts, which are the best way to identify local fungi. These happen a couple times a month from the first foray for morels and other spring mushrooms at Kankakee River State Park in late April or early May, until the September foray to gather displays for the Annual Mushroom Show. The free public show is every year during Labor Day weekend at the Chicago Botanic Garden.

The monthly newsletter has been called Fungus Friends since 1993, but was published before then without a title. The newsletter is where the details for the locations for the forays are listed.

The IMA is a participant in the North American Mycoflora Project, which will identify and map the mycobiota of North America, representing the Chicago region.
