= Christine Aventin =

French-language Belgian writer

- Born: August 4, 1971 (age 55)
- Writing career
- Language: French
- Notable work: Le Cœur en poche

Christine Aventin (born 4 August 1971) is a French-language Belgian writer. When she was just 15, she published Le Cœur en poche, which sold over 100,000 copies.

== Bibliography ==
The daughter of a Dutch teacher, Aventin was born in Hermalle-sous-Argenteau near Liège in southwestern Belgium. She studied French language and literature at University of Liège and English literature at Leeds University. She went on to teach Belgian literature at the Jagiellonian University in Kraków, Poland. In 1988, when she was 15, she published Le Cœur en poche. It tells the story of Alexandre, a prostitute's daughter, whose life is split between days with her friends at high school and nights in the world of prostitution. In order to get it published as quickly as possible, she took the manuscript to the Mercure de France publishing house, explaining that she was the daughter of a prostitute and had written her autobiography. She admitted later that she had made it all up but the book had already sold over 100,000 copies.

She was compared to Françoise Sagan who gained fame with Bonjour Tristesse when she was 18. After her second book Le Diable Peint (1988), which was far less successful, Aventin graduated University of Liège with a mémoire on Nathalie Barney : le mythe de la littérature lesbienne. After a period in Kraków, she worked as a journalist before writing her third novel, Le désir demeuré (2001), re-edited as Le somnambule (2006). Her next novel, Portrait nu (2005), is a powerful erotic novel, the story of how the narrator becomes sexually involved with a bar owner and a woman young enough to be his daughter. It is divided into three parts: the first covers a night, the second a week and the third a season in the author's attempt to convey a sense of increasing speed.

After her first novel, Aventin has tried to improve her style, adopting a poetic but precise approach and a strictly thought-out structure. "In each book," she explains, "I try to achieve an appropriate style and structure. It's a matter of finding the one-and-only correct structure and language for what I have to say. It obviously takes time to write the first few pages but then, like a living body, the heart beats, the blood circulates..."

Her most recent work, Red Shoes (2012), is the script for a 50-minute show revealing how Judy experiences the development of her body as she grows from childhood into an adult. She has to find new ways to face up to life, sex and thought.
