= Avi =

Avi is a given name, usually masculine, often a diminutive of Avram, Avraham, etc. It is sometimes feminine and a diminutive of the Hebrew spelling of Abigail.

People with the given name include:

- Avi Arad (born 1948), Israeli-American businessman, founder, chairman and CEO of Marvel Studios
- Avi Avital (born 1978), Israeli mandolin player and composer
- Avi Beker (1952–2015), Israel-American political scientist
- Avi Bell, professor of law at the University of San Diego School of Law and Bar-Ilan University Faculty of Law
- Avi Ben-Chimol (born 1985), Israeli basketball player
- Avi Cohen (1956–2010), Israeli footballer
- Avi Cohen (footballer, born 1962) (born 1962), Israeli former footballer
- Avi Dichter (born 1952), Israeli politician, former Minister of Internal Security, Minister of Home Front Defense and Shin Bet director
- Avi Gabai (born 1967), Israeli politician, former Minister of Environmental Protection (2015–2016)
- Avi Ivgi (born 1978), Israeli football goalkeeper
- Avi Kornick (born 1983), Israeli actor
- Avi Kaplan (born 1989), American-Jewish a capella singer and songwriter
- Avi Lerner (born 1947), American-Israeli film producer
- Avi Lewis (born 1968), Canadian politician
- Avi Loeb (born 1962), Israeli-American theoretical physicist
- Avi Maoz (born 1956), Israeli politician
- Avi Nesher (born 1953), Israeli film producer, director, screenwriter and actor
- Avi Nimni (born 1972), Israeli former footballer
- Avi Pazner (born 1937), Israeli retired diplomat
- Avi Peretz (footballer) (born 1971), Israeli former footballer
- Avi Peretz (singer) (born 1966), Israeli singer in Mizrahi music tradition
- Avi Ran (1963–1987), Israeli footballer
- Avi Rikan (born 1988), Israeli footballer
- Avi Rubin (born 1967), American computer scientist and expert in systems and networking security
- Avi Sagild (1933–1995), Danish film actress
- Avi Schafer (born 1998), Japanese professional basketball player
- Avi Shlaim (born 1945), Israeli-British professor and historian
- Avi Soffer (born 1986), Israeli footballer
- Avi Strool (born 1980), Israeli retired footballer
- Avi Tikva (born 1976), Israeli former footballer
- Avi Toledano (born 1948), Israeli singer and songwriter, runner-up in the 1982 Eurovision Song Contest
- Avi Wallerstein, Canadian ophthalmologist and laser eye surgeon, co-founder of LASIK MD
- Avi Weiss (born 1944), American rabbi, author, teacher, lecturer and activist
- Avi Wigderson (born 1956), Israeli mathematician and computer scientist
- Avi Wortzman (born 1970), Israeli politician, former Deputy Minister of Education (2013–2014)
- Avi Yehezkel (born 1958), Israeli former politician
- Avi Yehiel (born 1979), Israeli footballer
- Avi Yemini, Australian political commentator
