= Avelina =

Avelina is a female first name. It is the feminine form of Avelino, in honour of the 16th-century Italian saint Andrea Avellino (usually spelled Avelino in Spanish and Portuguese). His surname is derived from the name of the town of Avellino in Campania, itself from Latin Abellinum (of unknown meaning).

== History ==
The name was borrowed into the Russian language as "Авели́на" (Avelina). Its diminutives include Avelinka (Авели́нка), Lina (Ли́на), and Ava (А́ва).

In Latin languages, the name may have been Latinized from Proto-Germanic languages. It may be a diminutive of the name Avila.

== Notable people ==
- Avelina Landín (1919-1991), Mexican singer
- Avelina Mouzo Leis (1904-2017), Spanish supercentenarian
- Avelina de Fortibus, Latinized name of the British Aveline de Forz, Countess of Aumale (1259-1274)

== See also ==
- Aveline, a last name
- Evelyn (name)
- Eileen, a given name
