= Slaven (given name) =

Slaven is a masculine Slavic given name. Cognates include Slavko. Czech feminine form is Slavena.

Notable people with the name include:

- Slaven Bačić, Serbian Croat lawyer
- Slaven Bilić, Croatian football manager and former football player
- Slaven Čupković, Serbian football player
- Slaven Dizdarević, Slovak decathlete of Bosnian origin
- Slaven Dobrović, Croatian politician
- Slaven Došlo, Serbian actor
- Slaven Kovačević, Montenegrin football player
- Slaven Krajačić, Croatian athlete
- Slaven Letica, Croatian writer
- Slaven Musa, Bosnian Croat football player
- Slaven Rimac, Croatian basketball player
- Slaven Stanković, Serbian football player
- Slaven Stjepanović, Montenegrin football player
- Slaven Tolj, Croatian artist
- Slaven Zambata, Croatian football player
- Slaven Žužul, Croatian football functionary

== See also ==
- Slaven (surname)
- Slavens
