= Afa (mythology) =

Afā (also known as Toikia) is an aitu or supernatural being in the Polynesian mythology of Tokelau.
