= A Vacant Affair =

Singaporean post-hardcore band

- Also known as: AVA
- Origin: Singapore
- Genres: Post-hardcore, progressive rock
- Years active: 2004-present
- Labels: Wake Me Up, Universal
- Members: Matthew Lim; Joshua Tan; Hafyz Tajuddin; Rudi Osman; Tan Wei Shen

A Vacant Affair (also known as AVA) is a five-piece Singaporean post-hardcore band that was formed in 2004. The band is one of the first few groups to bring heavier music to the mainstream audience and reach the local charts in Singapore.

The band consists of Matthew Lim (vocals), Joshua Tan (vocals, guitar), Rudi Osman (guitar), Tan Wei Shen (bass), Hafyz Tajuddin (drums). They have so far released an EP and one full-length album. In December 2008 and February 2009 respectively, it was announced that Shen and Rudi were to pursue their studies overseas. Later at their shows it was announced that they would be replaced temporarily by Joseph Cinco of Marchtwelve and Cedric Chew of death metal band, Meza Virs, with Joseph on bass and Cedric on guitars respectively. Cedric produced their album and both are good friends of the band. Shen has since returned to Singapore.

== History ==
Formed in 2004, the band first started playing through underground gigs. Two years later, they first started gaining mainstream popularity when they performed in Baybeats '06. At the same time, they started selling their first self-titled EP album, which consisted of 5 tracks. They were featured on Mediacorp (2007 New Year's Eve Countdown @ Vivocity), Nokia (Flow! @ Ministry of Sound), The Esplanade (Baybeats 2006, Baybeats 2007, On the Waterfront shows), Midas Promotions (SingFest '08), National Library Board's 'Speak Good English' campaign (School Invasion Tour 2007 & Timbre Bar shows), Lime Magazine (Lime Sonic Bang 2007) and National Youth Council's numerous 'Weekend Trip @ Youth Park' gigs & *scape @ The Lab gigs. In early 2009, they also performed in "Live n Loaded" on national TV. The band has so far shared stages with other groups such as As I Lay Dying, Story of The Year, Funeral For A Friend, Love Me Butch and many others.

=== Debut album: Reasons to Leave (2007–present) ===
In early 2007, A Vacant Affair began writing new material for their debut full length, which was recorded producer Cedric Chew (Inversion Productions). It was not until late 2008 that the band released their long-awaited debut and full-length album. The album was titled "Reasons to Leave". To promote the album the band made a trailer for the album and posted it on YouTube. Their trailer can be viewed on their Myspace.

In November 2008 they were opening bands for the Rockstar Taste of Chaos international Asian stop at DXO, opening for international acts such as Grammy-nominated Metalcore band As I Lay Dying and rock group Story of the Year. They were also the opening band for Sky In Euphoria's album launch and headlined WeekendTRIP alongside Vermillion, Sky In Euphoria and other bands.

"Reasons To Leave" was released on 18 December 2009, with an album launch concert on 26 December 2009 at the Esplanade Recital Studio.

On 3 February 2009, the band was also featured on "Live N Loaded" and performed "Crestfallen" and "We Are Not The Same" live on air. Off air, they performed "Mirrors" and "The Departure". On 10 March 2009, A Vacant Affair was the opening act for The Red Jumpsuit Apparatus.

On 9 June 2009, they performed at Rock The Sub at The Substation, and on 20 June 2009 at 987FM's Life's a Beach, at Siloso Beach, Sentosa. On 4 July, they were the headlining act for Break The Chains at *scape Labs, which featured other local hardcore acts, such as ikilledkenny!, For Better Endings & Vermillion. They were the headlining act for the first day of Republic Polytechnic's IGNITE! Music Festival, on 24 July 2009.

On 25–26 July the band shot the music video for their first single, "We Are Not The Same", featuring their fans and some of their friends. They performed at SONIC BOOM's 3rd Anniversary concert in Manila on 22 August 2009, alongside Urbandub, Nothing to Declare, and Typecast. On 29 August 2009, Love Me Butch (Malaysia) collaborated with Matthew Lim for their single, 'Reconcile', at the annual Baybeats Music Festival in Singapore.

A Vacant Affair kicked off their 'DOOMSDAY TOUR' in Bacolod City, Philippines, in October 2009, playing alongside pinoy bands April Morning Skies, IMBUENOKUDOS, COG, and Boy Elroy.

== Influences ==
The band is influenced by metalcore/post-hardcore bands such as Funeral For a Friend, Glassjaw and Underoath.

== Band members ==
Current

- Matthew Lim: vocals
- Joshua Tan: guitar, backing vocals
- Rudi Osman: guitar
- Tan Wei Shen: bass
- Hafyz Tajuddin: drums, backing Vocals

Former

- Aaron Leng: guitar (Left in 2006)

== Discography ==
| Release date | Title | Label |
|---|---|---|
| 2006 | A Vacant Affair (EP) | Wake Me Up Music |
| 2008 | Reasons to Leave | Wake Me Up Music/Universal Music |
