= Antoine Aveline =

French engraver

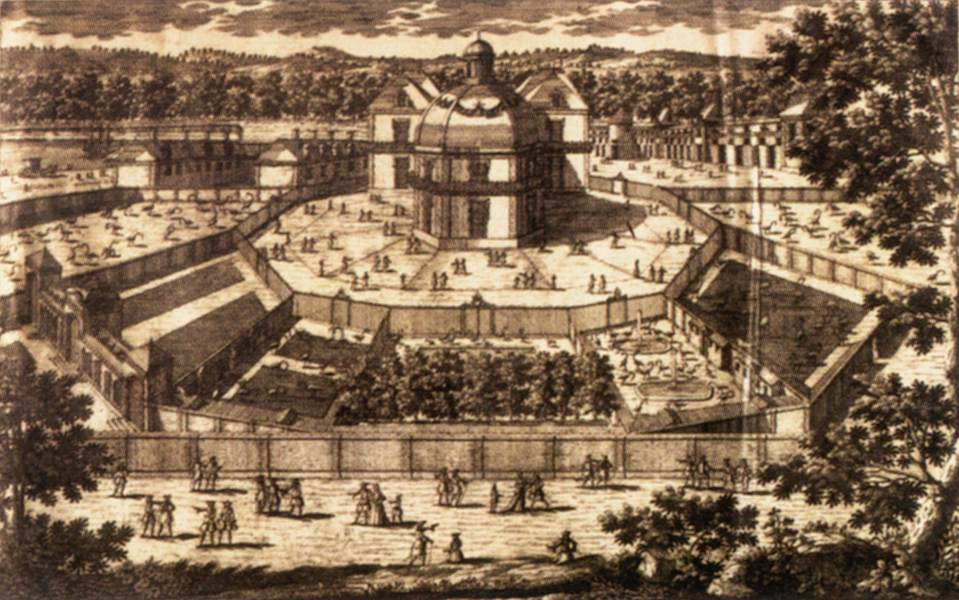
View and Perspective of the Ménagerie at Versailles by Antoine Aveline

Antoine Aveline (1691–1743) was a French engraver, son of Pierre Aveline and brother of Pierre-Alexandre Aveline.

== Biography ==
Aveline was born and worked all his life in Paris. He primarily worked with copperplate in his engraving.
