= Venus (given name) =

Venus is the Roman goddess of love.

It may refer to:

== People ==
- Venus Faiq (born 1963), Iraqi-Kurdish and Dutch writer, poet, translator, editor, and journalist
- Vénus Khoury-Ghata (1937–2026), Lebanese-French poet and writer
- Venus Lacy (born 1967), American former Olympic and professional basketball player
- Venus Raj (born 1988), Miss Universe Philippines 2010
- Venus Ramey (1924–2017), Miss America in 1944
- Venus Shakarian Toner (1908–1995), American sportswoman, pilot
- Venus Terzo (born 1967), Canadian actress
- Venus Vance, American slave
- Venus Williams (born 1980), American professional tennis player
- Venus Xtravaganza (1965–1988), American transgender woman and performer
- Venus (drag queen), Canadian drag queen

== Fictional characters ==
- Venus (Tannhäuser opera), in Wagner's opera
- Venus (Marvel Comics), two Marvel Comics characters
- Venus (Teenage Mutant Ninja Turtles), the short-lived sister of the Teenage Mutant Ninja Turtles
- Venus Bluegenes, in the British comic 2000 AD and in comic strips
- Venus McFlytrap, the daughter of the Venus flytrap, from Monster High
- Sailor Venus, the superhero persona of Minako Aino, a character from Sailor Moon and the main protagonist of Codename: Sailor V
