= List of storms named Ava =

The name Ava has been used for five tropical cyclones in the Eastern Pacific Ocean.

- Tropical Storm Ava (1962), formed well clear of the Mexican coastline.
- Tropical Storm Ava (1965), stayed well out to sea.
- Tropical Storm Ava (1969), moved parallel to the southwest Mexican coast, but did not make landfall.
- Hurricane Ava (1973), powerful hurricane that holds the record for the earliest forming Category 5 hurricane in the East Pacific basin.
- Tropical Storm Ava (1977), stayed clear of land.

The name Ava has also been used for one tropical cyclone in the Southwest Indian Ocean.

- Cyclone Ava (2018)
