= Ima (singer) =

Canadian Quebec singer

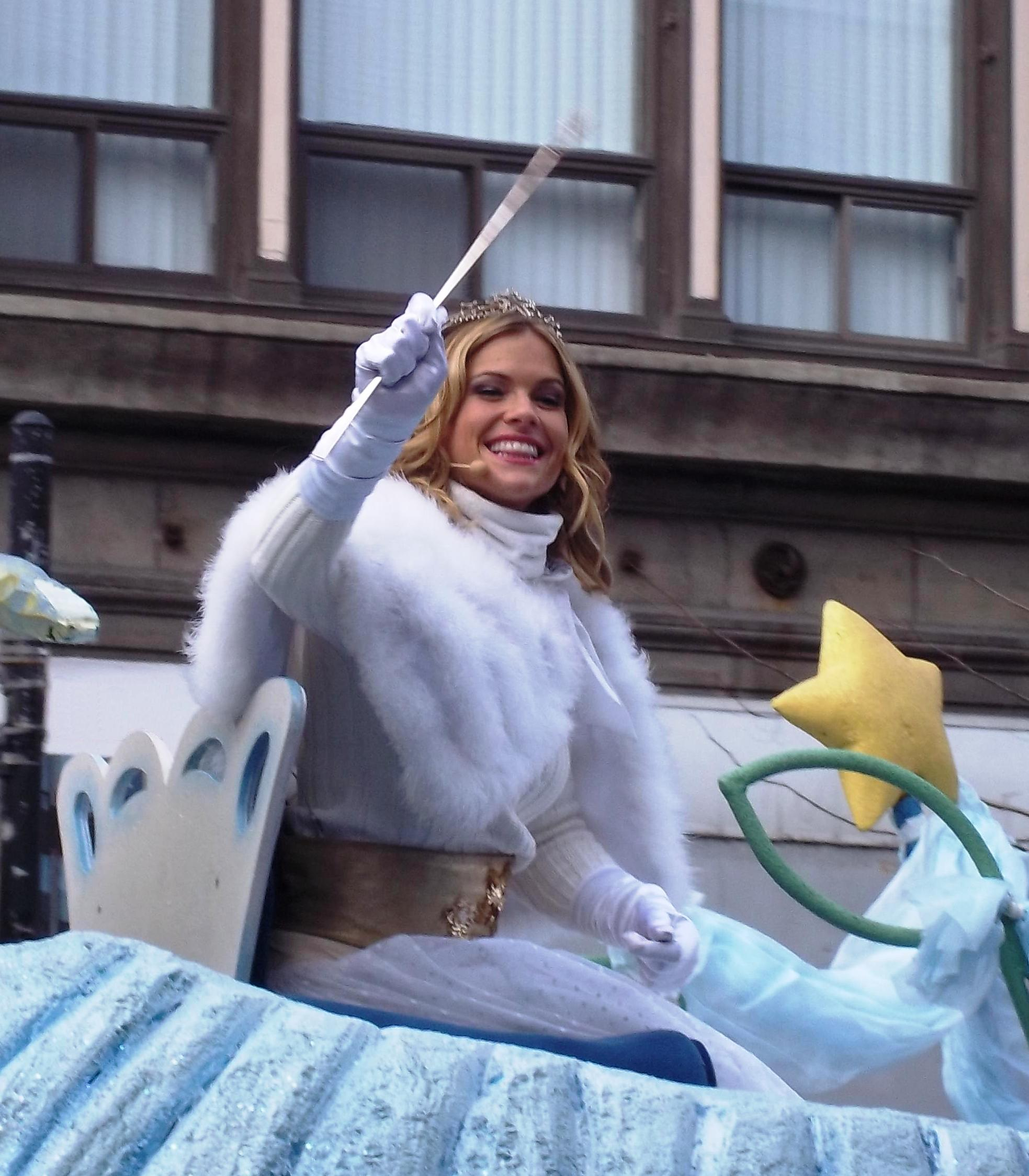
- Ima, Stars Fairy, in Santa Claus Parade

Background information
- Born: Marie-Andrée Bergeron; May 11, 1978 (age 47)
- Origin: Quebec, Canada
- Genres: Pop
- Occupation: Singer
- Instrument: Vocals
- Years active: 2002–present
- Website: ima.mu

Marie-Andrée Bergeron (born May 11, 1978), better known by her stage name Ima (sometimes stylized as IMA), is a Canadian singer. She has released six albums and many singles, the most popular being "Baïla" in 2002. She also acted in the two-season Quebec TV series Casino.

== Beginnings ==
During her childhood, Marie-Andrée Bergeron resided in Châteauguay, Quebec, and spent summers in New Brunswick. She studied singing, acting, and dancing. She used the name Ima as an easily pronounceable name.

== Music career ==
In 2001, she took part in "Ma première Place des Arts", an annual Montreal event for new artists and won for "Best Interpretation" and best public mention. In September 2002, she launched her debut album Ima, collaborating with a number of artists (Vincenzo Thoma, Eros Ramazzotti, Frédérick Baron, Sylvain Cossette, and Mario Pelchat). The album resulted in three singles: "Ton corps sur mon corps", "Donne-moi", and of course "Baïla". To promote the album, she engaged on a 50-show tour in 2003, including a show in Quebec City for the Fête nationale du Québec (Quebec National Day). Sylvain Cossette invited her to join his tour for about a dozen concerts.

Her pop/rock/folk album Pardonne-moi si je t'aime followed in March 2005, and March 2007 brought Smile, which was produced by Guy St-Onge and featured Ima singing in French, English, Italian, and Spanish. The album stayed on the Quebec Album Chart for 60 weeks and was certified platinum after sales of 100,000 copies. Smile also found critical acclaim and Ima toured to promote it, with a grand finale of 3 shows at Théâtre Saint-Denis in March 2008. In summer 2008 she had a series of appearances including the opening concert at Les FrancoFolies de Montréal, followed by shows at Montreal's Théâtre du Nouveau Monde and Montreal International Jazz Festival.

In March 2009, Ima launched her fourth album A la vida! with mostly French songs, followed by Christmas and in 2011 Precious.

== Acting career ==
In 2006, she had her debut in acting through the Quebec TV series Casino by Réjean Tremblay, in the role of Sandra Johnson broadcast on Radio-Canada. The popular series had a second season again with Ima. She claims her experience was inspiration for her successful album Smile.

== Charity ==
Ima was involved in many causes. After a show in Afghanistan with other artists, she became a spokesman for Amnesty International defending Afghan women right singing "Tu n'es pas seule" (You are not alone). She was also active for homeless people becoming a spokesperson for Recours des sans-abris of L’Œuvre Léger charity in Quebec.

== Discography ==
=== Albums ===
- 2002: Ima
- 2005: Pardonne-Moi si je t'aime
- 2007: Smile
- 2009: A la vida!
- 2009: Christmas
- 2011: Precious
- 2012: Best of 2002–2012
- 2014: Love moi
- 2016: Femme

=== Singles ===
- 2012: "To Love Somebody"

== Filmography ==
- 2006–2007: Casino as Sandra Johnson (TV series)
