= Pierre Aveline =

French engraver, print-publisher and print-seller

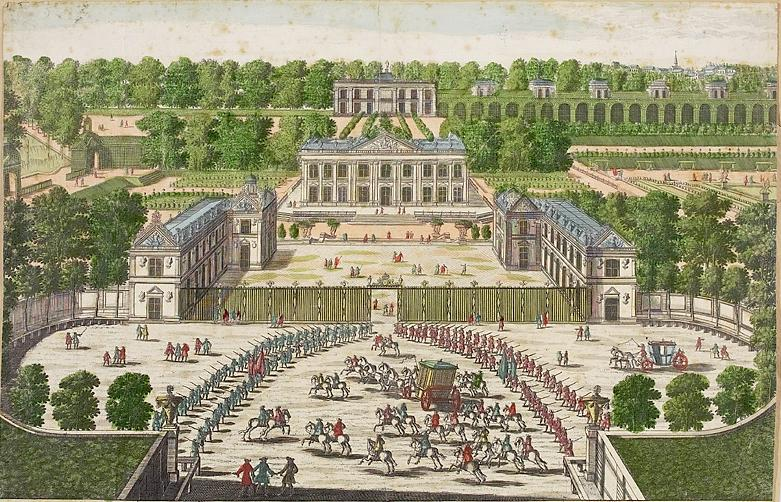
View of the Château de Marly by Pierre Aveline, 1720

Pierre Aveline (1656–1722), was a French engraver, print-publisher and print-seller.

Aveline was born in Paris, and the head of a family of artists, including his two sons Pierre-Alexandre Aveline and Antoine Aveline. He is best known for his reproductions of other artists' works. He died in Paris on 23 May 1722.
