= Avenir Peka =

Albanian politician

Deputy Minister of Interior Affairs
- Incumbent
- Assumed office 2009
- Preceded by: Gent Strazimiri

Personal details
- Born: 17 February 1978 (age 48)
- Party: Democratic Party
- Children: 3
- Education: University of Tirana
- Occupation: Politician
- Languages spoken: English; Arabic; French; Spanish

Avenir Peka (Albanian: [avɛˈniɾ ˈpɛka]; born 18 February 1975) is an Albanian politician and Albania's former Deputy Minister of Interior Affairs
