= Ima Lake =

Lake in Lake County, Minnesota

- Location within Minnesota
- Location: Lake County, Minnesota
- Coordinates: 48°1′N 91°16.5′W
- Type: lake

Ima Lake is a lake in Lake County, in the U.S. state of Minnesota.

Ima Lake was named for the daughter of Newton Horace Winchell, a Minnesota geologist. However, some others in the area believe the lake was named for the mother of Eli the Prophet, a religious figure who was said to have visited the site in 1943.

== See also ==
- List of lakes in Minnesota
