= Avenir (given name) =

Russian masculine given name

Avenir (Russian: Авени́р) is a Russian Christian male first name, Greek form of Biblical name Abner.

Its feminine version is Avenira. The name is derived from the Biblical Hebrew word abnēr, meaning father (god) is light. Its colloquial variant is Venir (Вени́р).

The diminutives of "Avenir" are Avenirka (Авени́рка), Ava (А́ва), Venya (Ве́ня), Vena (Ве́на), Vira (Ви́ра), and Vera (Ве́ра).

The patronymics derived from "Avenir" are "Авени́рович" (Avenirovich; masculine) and its colloquial form "Авени́рыч" (Avenirych), and "Авени́ровна" (Avenirovna; feminine). Notable individuals with the surname include:

- Avenir Bennigsen (1912–after 1996), Soviet intelligence officer
- Avenir Peka (born 1975), Albanian politician
- Avenir Sumin (1869–1913), Russian jeweler
- Avenir Yakovkin (1887–1974), Russo-Soviet astronomer

== See also ==
- Abner (name)
