= Slaven (surname) =

Slaven is a surname. Notable people with the surname include:

- Bernie Slaven (born 1960), Scottish-born Irish football player
- Mick Slaven (born 1961), Scottish musician

== See also ==
- Slaven (given name)
- Slavens
