= Vena (film) =

- Directed by: Chiara Fleischhacker
- Written by: Chiara Fleischhacker
- Produced by: Dietmar Güntsche, Sophie Kühne, Martin Rohé, Olivia Sieranski, Svenja Vanhoefer
- Starring: Emma Nova, Paul Wollin, Friederike Becht, Barbara Philipp
- Cinematography: Lisa Jilg
- Edited by: Tobias Wieduwilt
- Music by: Peter Albrecht
- Release date: 28 November 2024 (Germany)
- Running time: 116 minutes
- Country: Germany
- Language: German

Vena is a 2024 German drama film directed by Chiara Fleischhacker. It is her debut feature and stars Emma Nova as Jenny, a young woman confronting unwanted pregnancy, drug addiction, and the threat of imprisonment. The film explores themes of institutional violence and the social treatment of mothers within the penal system.

== Plot ==
Jenny, portrayed by Emma Nova, constructs a glittering, self‑made universe as a means of escape while struggling with addiction. Her personal crisis intensifies when she faces an unwanted pregnancy and looming incarceration, forcing her to confront both her inner turmoil and societal judgment.

== Release ==
The film premiered at the Filmfest Hamburg in October 2024 and was released theatrically in Germany on 28 November 2024. A DVD release followed in May 2025.

== Reception ==
The German newspaper taz described the film as a debut that confronts issues of unwanted pregnancy, drug use, and institutional violence. Reviewer Carolin Weidner highlighted the protagonist’s attempt to create a glittering universe while facing addiction and imprisonment.

Film‑Rezensionen.de praised the performances of Emma Nova and Paul Wollin, noting the film’s empathetic portrayal of addiction and motherhood.
