= Avenir Bennigsen =

Soviet intelligence officer (1912–1996)

Avenir Bennigsen (Russian: Авенир Беннигсен, real name unknown, maybe Alexandr Petrovich Goglidze; 1912 – after 1996) was a Soviet intelligence agent, colonel, active during and after World War II.

== Biography ==
His father was a Georgian, his mother was a Russian noble. In 1934 he has entered the intelligence service. Since 1937 he was illegally acting in Nazi Germany. In Germany, he was a tank commander taking part in the invasion of Poland and France, later Sturmbannführer (major) of SS. In 1941-1944 he worked at an aviation factory in Flossenbürg.

1945 - 1947 - colonel of NKVD, acting in Paris at repatriation commission. 1948 - 1956 and 1963 — 1966 - intelligence agent in Belgium and France.

Later he lived in Israel and died there.

== Literature ==
- Shneer, A. (2005). Iz NKVD v SS i obratno: iz rasskazov shturmbannfi︠u︡rera. Moskva: Paralleli. ISBN 978-5-98831-003-7. OCLC 65328870.
