= Aventin =

8th-century Frankish saint

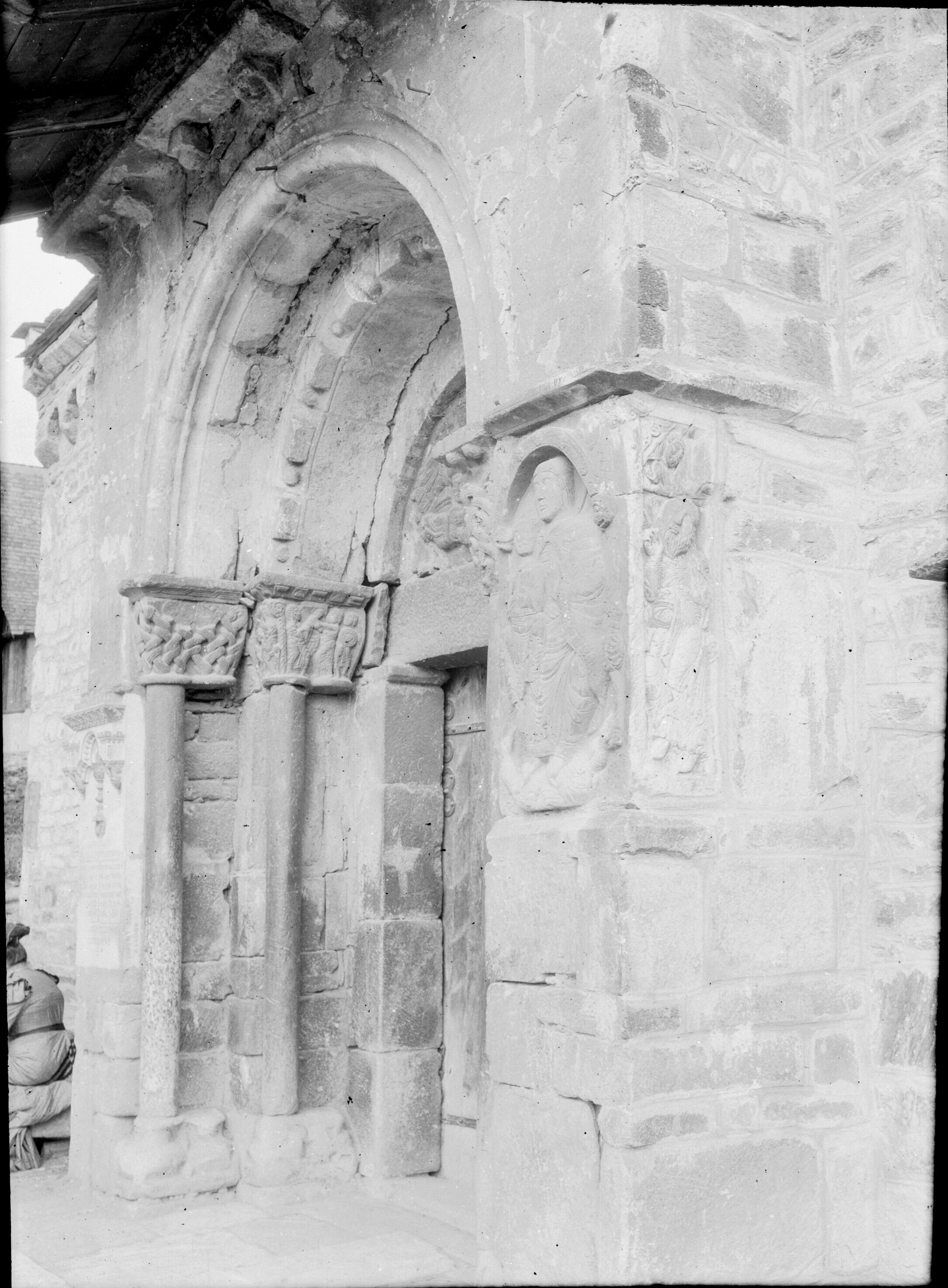
Portal of the church of Saint Aventin, photographed by Eugène Trutat.

Saint Aventin was a Frankish saint and hermit of the 8th century.

== Life ==
Born near Bagnères-de-Luchon in the Pyrenees, Aventin became a hermit in the valley of Larboust.

== Legends ==
A legend says that he performed many miracles. In one story, he was taken prisoner by Saracen invaders and he was locked in the Tower of Castel-Blancat, Saccourvielle. To escape he leapt from the top of the Tower, crossed the entire Valley and fell back without harm on the other side, printing his footprint in a stone. This stone is still visible on the threshold of the chapel built at this location.

In another, Aventin was beheaded but picked up his head and walked to the place where would be his tomb. Centuries later, this location was revealed to a shepherd who put the remains of Aventine on a sledge drawn by cows, which stopped at the place where the village of Saint-Aventin now stands.

After his death there occurred an outbreak of plague ravaging the region. The local population appealed to the protection of Saint Aventin to help with the plague.

== Veneration ==
The cult of saint Aventin is found in the Val d'Aran and Aragon. On his birthday, 13 June, there was a pilgrimage to his village. The Revolution saw the end of this tradition.

== Gallery ==
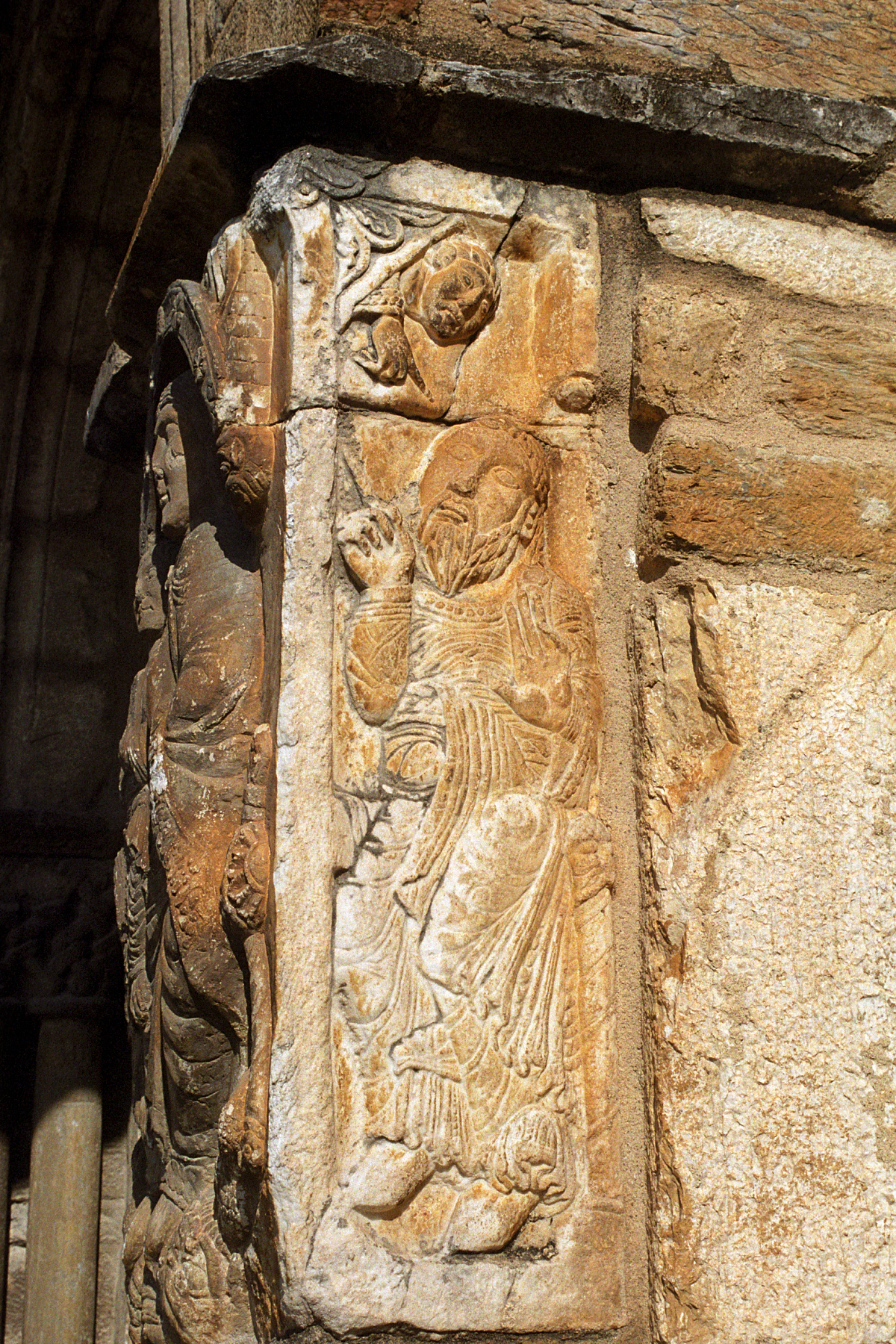
Bas-relief, portail de l’église Saint-Aventin

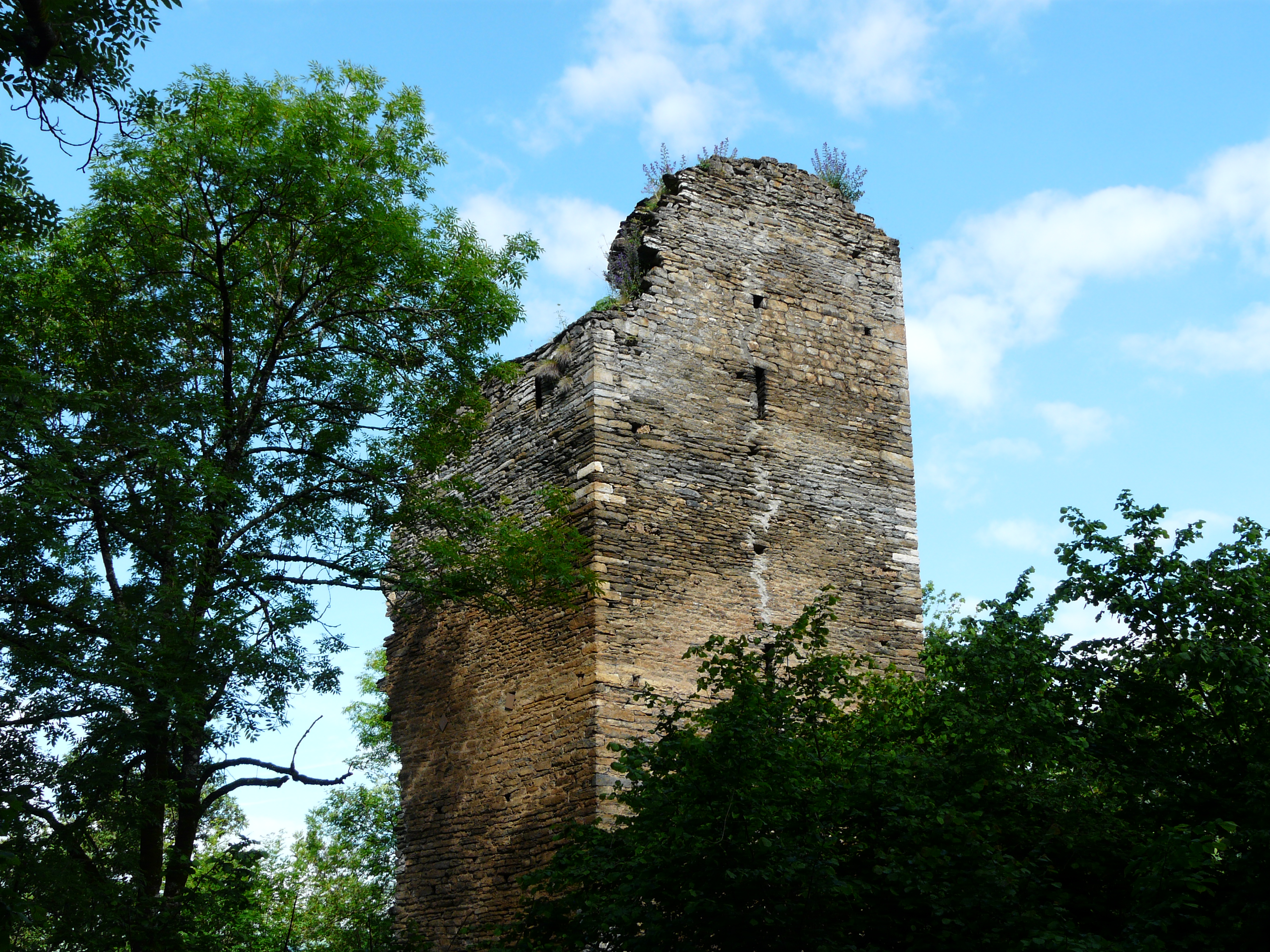
La tour de Castel-Blancat

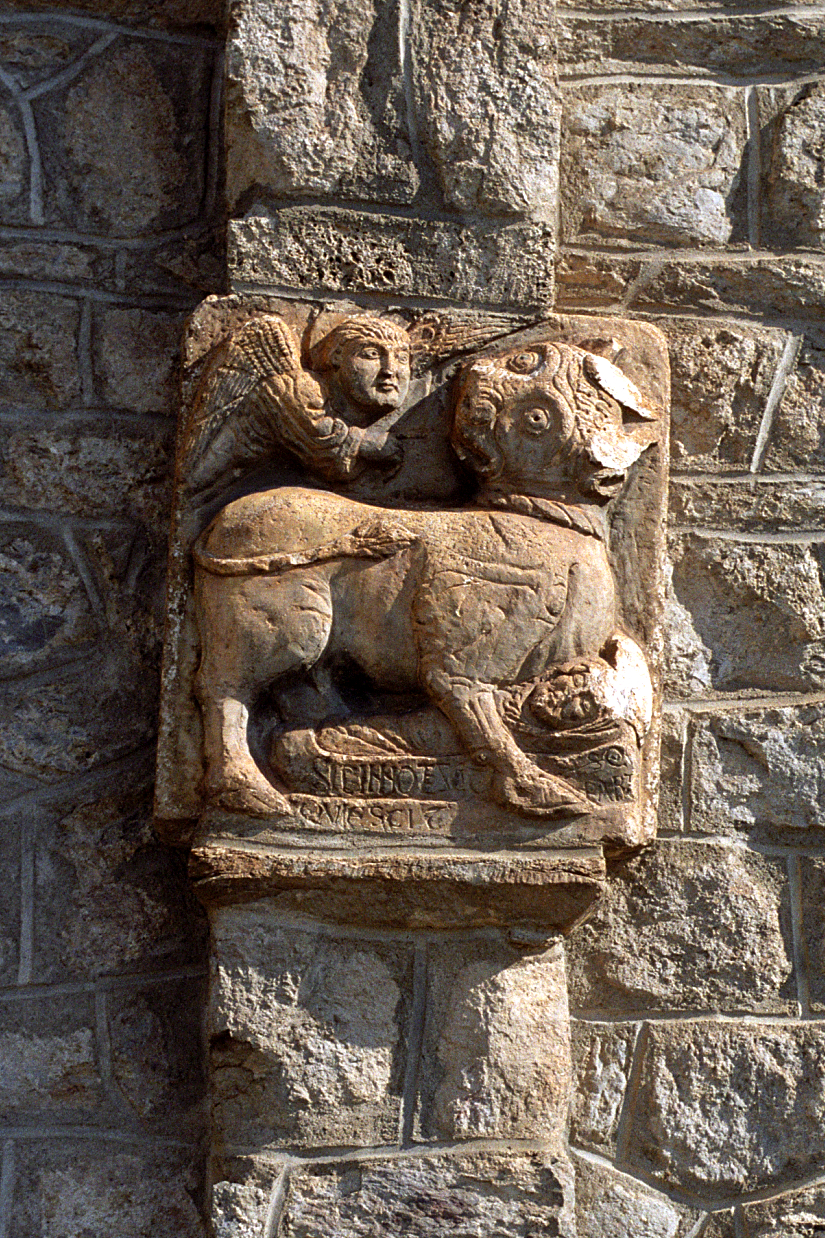
Découverte du corps de saint Aventin par un taureau, église de Saint-Aventin

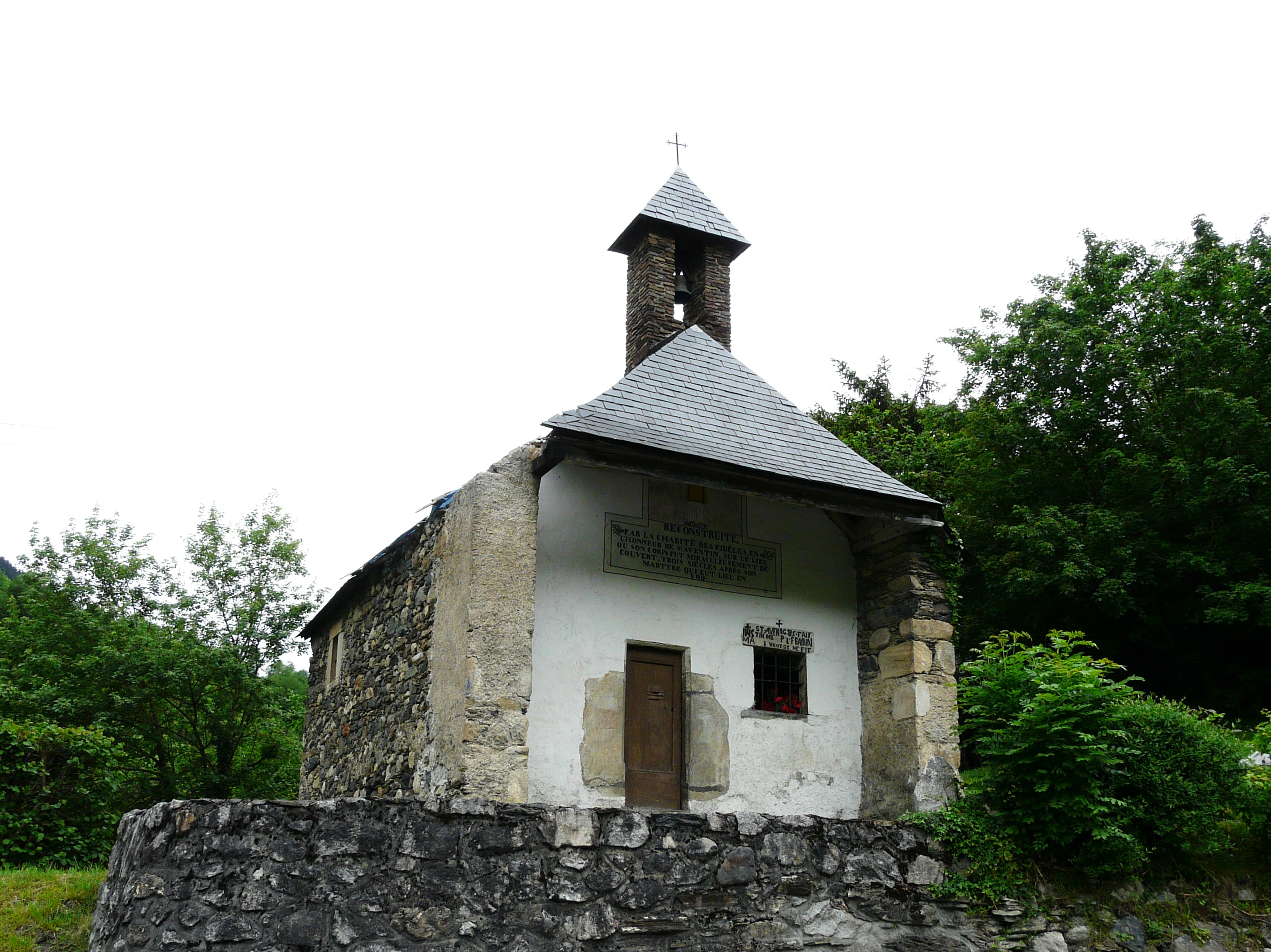
La Chapelle du Miracle
