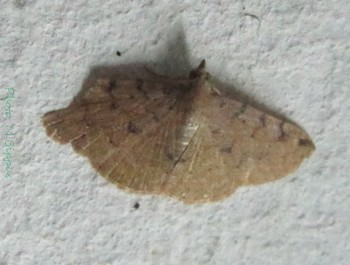

Scientific classification
- Kingdom: Animalia
- Phylum: Arthropoda
- Class: Insecta
- Order: Lepidoptera
- Superfamily: Noctuoidea
- Family: Erebidae
- Subfamily: Boletobiinae
- Genus: Corgatha; Walker, 1859

Type species
- Corgatha zonalis Walker, 1859

Synonyms
- Palura Walker, 1861; Guriauna Walker, 1861; Ausinza Walker, 1864; Zitna Walker, [1866]; Celeopsyche Butler, 1879; Callipyris Meyrick, 1891; Aventina Staudinger, 1892; Trichogatha Warren, 1913; Penisa Warren, 1911; Falcapyris Berio, 1959

= Corgatha =

Genus of moths

Corgatha is a genus of moths of the family Erebidae erected by Francis Walker in 1859.

== Taxonomy ==
The genus has previously been classified in the subfamily Acontiinae of the family Noctuidae.

== Description ==
Its palpi are porrect (extending forward). Second joint triangularly scaled, and third joint minute. Abdomen tuftless.

== Species ==
- Corgatha albicinctalis Walker, [1866]
- Corgatha albipunctulata Warren, 1913
- Corgatha albivertex Hampson, 1907
- Corgatha ancistrodes Turner, 1936
- Corgatha argenticosta Hampson, 1910
- Corgatha argentisparsa Hampson, 1895
- Corgatha argillacea Butler, 1879
- Corgatha argyrota Hampson, 1910
- Corgatha aroa Bethune-Baker, 1906
- Corgatha atrifalcis Hampson, 1907
- Corgatha atrimargo Hampson, 1910
- Corgatha atripuncta Warren, 1913
- Corgatha binotata Warren, 1913
- Corgatha castaneorufa Rothschild, 1915
- Corgatha chionocraspis Hampson, 1918
- Corgatha chopardi Berio, 1954
- Corgatha comorana Viette, 1981
- Corgatha constipicta Hampson, 1895
- Corgatha costalba Wileman & West 1929
- Corgatha costimacula Staudinger, 1892
- Corgatha costinotalis Moore, 1867
- Corgatha crassilineata Gaede, 1916
- Corgatha dichionistis Turner, 1902
- Corgatha dictaria Walker, 1861
- Corgatha dinawa Bethune-Baker, 1906
- Corgatha diploata Hampson, 1910
- Corgatha diplochorda Hampson, 1907
- Corgatha dipyra Turner, 1902
- Corgatha drepanodes Hampson, 1910
- Corgatha drosera Meyrick, 1891
- Corgatha emarginata Hampson, 1914
- Corgatha enispodes Hampson, 1910
- Corgatha excisa Hampson, 1894
- Corgatha figuralis Walker, [1866]
- Corgatha flavicosta Hampson, 1910
- Corgatha flavipuncta Hampson, 1910
- Corgatha funebris Viette, 1961
- Corgatha fusca Tanaka, 1973
- Corgatha fuscibasis Gaede, 1916
- Corgatha fusciceps Sugi, 1982
- Corgatha gemmifer Hampson, 1894
- Corgatha griseicosta Holloway, 1976
- Corgatha hypoxantha Hampson, 1910
- Corgatha implexata Walker, 1862
- Corgatha incerta Viette, 1961
- Corgatha inflammata Hampson, 1914
- Corgatha infrarubra Strand, 1920
- Corgatha inornata Warren, 1913
- Corgatha laginia Gaede, 1916
- Corgatha leucosticta Hampson, 1910
- Corgatha macariodes Hampson, 1910
- Corgatha marumoi Sugi, 1982
- Corgatha mazoatra Viette, 1961
- Corgatha melanistis Hampson, 1910
- Corgatha microplexia Viette, 1961
- Corgatha miltophyres Turner, 1920
- Corgatha miltopolia Turner, 1945
- Corgatha minor Moore, [1885]
- Corgatha minuta Bethune-Baker, 1906
- Corgatha molybdophaes Turner, 1936
- Corgatha nabalua Holloway, 1976
- Corgatha neona Viette, 1961
- Corgatha nigricosta Warren, 1913
- Corgatha nitens Butler, 1879
- Corgatha niveicosta Hampson, 1910
- Corgatha obsoleta Marumo, 1936
- Corgatha ochrida Hampson, 1918
- Corgatha ochrobapta Turner, 1941
- Corgatha odontota D. S. Fletcher, 1961
- Corgatha olivata Hampson, 1902
- Corgatha omopis Meyrick, 1902
- Corgatha omopisoides Berio, 1954
- Corgatha ozolica Hampson, 1910
- Corgatha ozolicoides Berio, 1954
- Corgatha peroma Viette, 1961
- Corgatha pleuroplaca Turner, 1936
- Corgatha poliostrota Hampson, 1914
- Corgatha porphyrea Hampson, 1910
- Corgatha producta Hampson, 1902
- Corgatha pusilla Swinhoe, 1903
- Corgatha pygmaea Wileman, 1911
- Corgatha regula Gaede, 1916
- Corgatha rimosa Viette, 1961
- Corgatha roseocrea Viette, 1961
- Corgatha rubecula Warren, 1913
- Corgatha rubra Hampson, 1891
- Corgatha semipardata Walker, 1861
- Corgatha sideropasta Turner, 1936
- Corgatha squamigera Warren, 1913
- Corgatha subindicata Kenrick, 1917
- Corgatha submacariodes Berio, 1960
- Corgatha tafana Viette, 1976
- Corgatha tenuilineata Gaede, 1916
- Corgatha terracotta Hampson, 1910
- Corgatha thyridoides Kenrick, 1917
- Corgatha tornalis Wileman, 1915
- Corgatha trichogyia Hampson, 1907
- Corgatha uniformis Berio, 1960
- Corgatha vanjamanitra Viette, 1981
- Corgatha variegata Bethune-Baker, 1906
- Corgatha xanthobela Hampson, 1918
- Corgatha zonalis Walker, [1859]
