= Aviafa =

Aviafa (Russian: Авиа́фа) is an old and uncommon Russian female first name.

The diminutives of "Aviafa" are Ava (А́ва) and Afa (А́фа).
