= Avim (given name) =

Russian masculine first name

Avim (Russian: Ави́м) is an old and uncommon Russian Christian male first name. The name is possibly derived from the Greek word aēma, meaning a light breeze.

The diminutives of "Avim" are Avimka (Ави́мка), Ava (А́ва), and Ima (И́ма).

The patronymics derived from "Avim" are "Ави́мович" (Avimovich; masculine) and "Ави́мовна" (Avimovna; feminine).
