= American Federation of Astrologers =

Association of US Astrologers

The American Federation of Astrologers (AFA) was incorporated on May 4, 1938, in Washington, D.C. Now headquartered in Tempe, Arizona, AFA was established to encourage and promote the practice and belief of astrology through research, teaching, lecturing and practice. Ernest and Catharine Grant were its founders.

AFA was originally named The American Federation of Scientific Astrologers, in keeping with the European trend of the time which was the result of a strong intellectual movement within the ranks of astrologers in Europe towards the establishment of astrology as a respected science. However, the name was changed to the American Federation of Astrologers in the mid-1940s.

The AFA has been active on several different levels since its inception, including the hosting of a periodic astrological conferences. The AFA was the first U.S. astrological organization to administer certification examinations for astrologers, a program which it continues to sponsor. It is also a publisher of astrological books and has a world-class library of astrological literature and journals.

AFA publishes astrological texts, primarily for intermediate and advanced astrologers, which are available for sale to members and non-members, both directly from AFA and through many bookstores. AFA also publishes a monthly journal, Today's Astrologer, which is distributed to the general membership.

There are various categories of membership available and open to anyone: Associate and Research. Members located outside the United States pay higher dues as international members to compensate for the greater cost of postage, while those aged 65 and older pay reduced dues as senior members. Research members pay a higher level of fees, and additionally receive a separate journal called the AFA Journal of Research, which specializes in articles of relevance to astrological research. It is published periodically. Neither Today's Astrologer nor the Journal of Research is available for sale to non-members.

In earlier years, the AFA also published an annual Yearbook consisting of the transcripts of all the papers presented at its annual conferences. This large, substantial publication began in 1939 and was issued annually until 1942, then more sporadically in later years, appearing again in 1944, 1946, 1947, 1948, 1950, 1952 and 1954. Copies have now become very scarce.

In the late 1940s, the AFA also issued a series of numbered publications called Research Bulletins, each of which addressed a single research topic. These ranged in theme from Astrological Americana to Angioma; apart from that on Astrological Americana, which remains common, most of them have become scarce.

The AFA's most prominent activity as a publisher, however, has been in the publication of astrological books. Especially from the 1970s to the present day, it has been one of the leading publishers of astrological literature in the world, and has also reprinted many otherwise out-of-print and often very scarce works from the early 20th century in high-quality new editions, as well as translations of Morin's Astrologica Gallica, first published in the 17th century.

== Sources ==
- AFA website
