= Aventin (given name) =

Aventin (Russian: Авенти́н) is an old and uncommon Russian male first name. Its feminine version is Aventina. The name is derived from Aventinus, which is the Latin name of the Aventine Hill, one of the hills on which the city of Rome was built.

The diminutives of "Aventin" are Aventinka (Авенти́нка), Ava (А́ва), Venya (Ве́ня), Vena (Ве́на), and Tina (Ти́на).

The patronymics derived from "Aventin" are "Авенти́нович" (Aventinovich; masculine) and "Авенти́новна" (Aventinovna; feminine).

== See also ==
- Saint Aventin, 8th-century French Saint and hermit
