= Avenira =

Avenira (Russian: Авени́ра) is a Russian non-canonical (absent from the Orthodox menologia) female first name. Its masculine version is Avenir.

The diminutives of "Avenira" are Avenirka (Авени́рка), Ava (А́ва), Venya (Ве́ня), Vena (Ве́на), Vira (Ви́ра), and Nira (Ни́ра).
