= Aventina (given name) =

Aventina (Russian: Авенти́на) is a Russian female first name. Its masculine version is Aventin.

The name was included into various, often handwritten, church calendars throughout the 17th–19th centuries, but was omitted from the official Synodal Menologium at the end of the 19th century. However, according to other sources, this name is non-canonical. In 1924–1930, the name was included into various Soviet calendars, which included the new and often artificially created names promoting the new Soviet realities and encouraging the break with the tradition of using the names in the Synodal Menologia. It was rationalized as a form of the male name Aventin, itself a form of Aventinus, a son of Hercules.

The diminutives of "Aventina" are Aventinka (Авенти́нка), Ava (А́ва), Venya (Ве́ня), Vena (Ве́на), and Tina (Ти́на).
