= Avner (name) =

Avner is a Hebrew given name and surname, variant of Abner. Notable people with the name include:

== Given name ==
- Avner Ash, American mathematician
- Avner Ben-Gal (1966–2024), Israeli artist
- Avner Ben-Zaken (born 1967), Israeli historian of science
- Avner Cohen, Israeli-American academic
- Avner Dorman, Israeli musician
- Avner Eisenberg or Avner the Eccentric, American performer and magician
- Avner Faingulernt (born 1961), Israeli film director
- Avner Falk, Israeli clinical psychologist and author
- Avner Friedman (born 1932), American mathematician
- Avner Golasa (1957–2020), Israeli footballer
- Avner Greif, American economist
- Avner Gvaryahu, Israeli activist
- Avner Halperin, Israeli entrepreneur
- Avner Hizkiyahu (1926–1994), Israeli actor
- Avner Laskin (born 1969), Israeli chef, restaurateur, and caterer
- Avner Less (1916–1987), Israeli police officer
- Avner Magen (1968–2010), Canadian computer scientist
- Avner Mandelman, Israeli-Canadian businessman and writer
- Avner Offer, British historian
- Avner Shahaf (born 1987), Israeli cinematographer
- Avner Shaki (1926–2005), Israeli politician
- Avner Shalev (born 1939), Israeli general
- Avner Shats (born 1959), Israeli author and poet
- Avner Sher (born 1951), Israeli architect and artist
- Avner Strauss, Israeli music producer, musician, and poet
- Avner Treinin (1928–2011), Israeli chemist and poet
- Avner Wishnitzer, Israeli peace activist and academic
- Avner Yashar (born 1956), Israeli architect

== Surname ==
- Elaine Avner, American astronomer
- Yehuda Avner, Israeli prime ministerial advisor, diplomat, and author

== See also ==
- Avner (disambiguation)
- Avenir (given name), a related Russian male first name
