= Abner (name) =

Abner is a given name and a surname of Hebrew origin. It is the name of Abner (Hebrew: אַבְנֵר ʾAḇnēr, "father of lamp/light") from the Bible (Book of Samuel), first cousin to King Saul and commander-in-chief of his army. Other notable people with the name include:

== Given name ==
- Abnér (died 760), Irish abbot
- Abner of Burgos (c.1270 – c.1347), Jewish philosopher, convert to Christianity and polemical writer against his former religion
- Abner Biberman (1909–1977), American actor, director and screenwriter
- Abner Coburn (1803–1885), 30th governor of Maine
- Abner Cole (1783–1835), American newspaper editor
- Abner Cook (1814–1884), Texas architect and general contractor
- Abner Cotto (born 1987), Puerto Rican boxer
- Abner Dalrymple (1857–1939), American Major League Baseball player
- Abner Dean (1910–1982), American cartoonist
- Abner Doble (1890–1961), American mechanical engineer who built and sold steam-powered automobiles
- Abner Doubleday (1819–1893), American Civil War Union Army general often erroneously credited with inventing baseball
- Abner Felipe (born 1996), Brazilian footballer
- Abner C. Harding (1807–1874), member of Congress, U.S. Representative from Illinois and Union Army brigadier general during the American Civil War
- Abner Haynes (1937–2024), American college and American Football League player
- Abner Hazeltine (1793–1879), American politician, U.S. Representative from New York and lawyer
- Abner Jay (1921–1993), American multi-instrument musician
- Abner Jones (1772–1841), minister and early church reformer in the United States
- Abner Kneeland (1774–1844), American radical evangelist and theologian, the last man jailed in the United States for blasphemy
- Abner Lacock (1770–1837), American politician, Senator from Pennsylvania, Pennsylvania Militia brigadier general, surveyor and civil engineer
- Abner Lewis (1801–1879), U.S. Representative from New York, judge and attorney
- Abner Smith Lipscomb (1789–1856), Secretary of State for the Republic of Texas, lawyer and judge
- Abner Louima (born 1966), Haitian-American victim of police brutality
- Abner Mares (born 1985), Mexican boxer who won several world championship titles
- Abner Reid McClelan (1831–1917), Canadian politician
- Abner J. Mikva (1926–2016), American former U.S. Representative from Illinois, White House Counsel, federal judge and law professor
- Abner Nash (1740–1786), second Governor of North Carolina, representative in the Continental Congress and lawyer
- Abner Pākī (c. 1808–1855), Hawaiian chief
- Abner Monroe Perrin (1827–1864), Confederate general in the American Civil War
- Abner Powell (1860–1953), American Major League Baseball player, manager and team owner
- Abner Read (1821–1863), United States Navy officer killed in the American Civil War
- Abner Salles da Silva (born 2004), Brazilian footballer
- Abner Shimony (1928–2015), American physicist and philosopher of science
- Abner W. Sibal (1921–2000), American politician and U.S. Representative from Connecticut
- Abner Silver (1899–1966), American songwriter
- Abner Taylor (1829–1903), U.S. Representative from Illinois and businessman
- Abner Uribe (born 2000), Dominican baseball player
- Abner Vinícius (born 2000), Brazilian footballer
- Abner Wilcox (1808–1869), American missionary teacher in the Kingdom of Hawaii
- Abner Wimberly (1926–1976), American football player
- Abner Zwillman (1904–1959), Jewish-American gangster

== Surname ==
- David Abner Sr. (1826–1902), American legislator and former slave
- Douglas Abner (born 1996), Brazilian footballer
- Ewart Abner (1923–1997), American record company executive
- Philip Abner (born 2002), pitcher in Major League Baseball
- Shawn Abner (born 1966), American Major League Baseball player
- Seth Abner (born 1995), better known as Scump, American professional Call of Duty player, son of Shawn Abner

== Fictional characters ==
- Abner Brown, the villain of John Masefield's novel The Box of Delights
- Abner Jenkins, a villain in Marvel Comics
- Abner Kravitz, neighbor to central character Samantha Stephens in the 1960s sitcom Bewitched, played by George Tobias
- Abner Krill, aka the Polka-Dot Man, a villain in DC Comics
- Abner Marsh, the protagonist of George R. R. Martin's novel Fevre Dream
- Abner Peabody, a character in the Lum and Abner American radio program (1931–1954)
- Abner Ravenwood, father of Marion Ravenwood
- Abner Yokum, title character of the American comic strip L'il Abner

== See also ==
- Abner (disambiguation)
- Avenir (given name), a related Russian male first name
- Avner (name)
