= USS Abner Read =

USS Abner Read has been the name of more than one United States Navy ship, and may refer to:

- USS Abner Read (DD-526), a Fletcher-class destroyer commissioned in 1943 and sunk in 1944
- USS Abner Read (DD-769), a Gearing-class destroyer laid down during World War II but cancelled during construction in September 1946 and scrapped on the building ways

== See also ==
- Abner Read, US Navy officer and namesake of both ships
