= Paskin =

Paskin is a surname. Notable people with the surname include:

Stephen Paskin (born 1964) Collingwood Ont. Canada. 1980 North American amateur banjo champion, 1983 Canadian 5-string banjo champion. Numerous recordings, and stints with artists such as, Tommy Hunter, Nashville Brass, Mac Wiseman, session musician with Ambassador records, CBC, and RCA.

- John Paskin (born 1962), South African footballer
- Marc Paskin (born 1949), American businessman and television personality

== See also ==
- John Paskin Taylor (1928–2015), British field hockey player
- Laskin
- Paskins
- Raskin
