= Hunter's Run =

2007 novel

- First edition
- Author: George R. R. Martin, Gardner Dozois and Daniel Abraham
- Cover artist: Tony Sweet
- Language: English
- Genre: Science fiction novel
- Publisher: Eos/HarperCollins (US), Harper Voyager (UK)
- Publication date: September 2007
- Publication place: United States
- Media type: Print (hardback, paperback)
- Pages: 394 pp
- ISBN: 0-06-137329-X (US edition)
- OCLC: 156816533
- Dewey Decimal: 813/.54 22
- LC Class: PS3563.A7239 H86 2008

Hunter's Run is a 2007 science fiction novel written by Daniel Abraham, Gardner Dozois and George R. R. Martin. It is a heavily rewritten and expanded version of an earlier novella called Shadow Twin.

The novel was originally published by Harper Voyager in the UK in September 2007, with a cover photo by Tony Sweet. In January 2008, Eos/HarperCollins published it in the US, with cover art by Stephan Martinière. Subterranean Press published a limited edition with cover art by Bob Eggleton.

== Plot summary ==
On the colony planet of São Paulo, a man named Ramón Espejo kills a man in a fight outside a bar over a woman. It transpires the man was a diplomat, and Espejo decides to lie low in the wilderness in the north of the planet's major continent. While in hiding, he accidentally discovers an alien installation. The suspicious aliens capture him and render him unconscious. When Ramón wakes up, he learns that another man had followed him into the alien hideout, but has since escaped, presumably to reveal the existence of the aliens to the rest of the colony. The aliens do not want this and thereby enslave Ramón using highly advanced technology, deciding that since he is human, he can be used to track down and find the other intruder. Ramón at first tries to stall and help his "prey", but his plans are ruined by his captor Maneck, whom he eventually gets to know a little better, during their travels together. Ramón realizes that the aliens are not evil or fundamentally incomprehensible, only culturally different. He then learns a few things about the race and accordingly, begins to question some aspects of his own life. Eventually it is revealed to him that the man they are chasing after is actually the "real" Ramón and that he (the man who is kept prisoner by Maneck) in reality is an artificial clone made by the aliens. There never was any other man who broke into the installation, it was Ramón who has escaped. Now disheartened, the clone-Ramón manages to escape by tricking his alien keeper and eventually meets up with his original. The original Ramón does not recognize him, since the clone is considerably younger and in better shape. After traveling together for some time, the clone realizes with a start that he does not actually like the person that he is (or was) very much; the original has never met Maneck or gotten to know the aliens and thus has never had time to ponder some of the questions the clone has started to struggle with. After the real Ramón finally sees that he is traveling with a man who bears uncanny resemblance to him, the clone kills his original in an act of desperation and then, assuming his (former?) identity, takes up a new life as his old self in the capital. The novel ends with him deciding to go back, make peace and reach out to the aliens in an attempt to use their knowledge of the planet's mineral wealth to enrich him. The story ends before we learn their response to this offer.

== Writing process ==
The text of the novel is followed by a section explaining how the book was written and re-written over a period of 30 years, including an interview with all three authors and how they conceived the ideas for the book.

In 1976, science fiction author and editor Dozois conceived of a story beginning with a man floating in darkness. Dozois conceived of Ramón's name, ethnicity (feeling that Hispanic protagonists were underrepresented in science fiction) and his basic situation, but the story did not proceed far. The following year, while working as a guest instructor at a Catholic women's college at the invitation of Martin, his friend and colleague, Dozois read the story out loud. Martin thought the story was interesting and waited for Dozois to finish it, but Dozois found himself unable to do so. In 1981, Dozois suggested that Martin continue the story instead, which he did, bringing the story to the beginning of the chase sequence. Martin hit on the idea of expanding the story to a 500-page novel exploring the ecosystem of São Paulo.

After his writing on the story stalled in 1982, Martin handed it back to Dozois, suggesting they alternate working on it until it was done. However, Dozois was unable to come up with any ideas on how to proceed and the book remained in his desk drawer until 2002, when he and Martin decided to bring the story to the attention of a third author, Daniel Abraham. Abraham completed the story which, now titled Shadow Twin, was published by Subterranean as a novella in 2004. Dozois then went back and reworked the manuscript into a 380-page novel, renamed Hunter's Run, for publication in 2007.
