= Tiamat's Wrath =

2019 science fiction novel by James S. A. Corey

- First edition cover
- Author: James S. A. Corey
- Cover artist: Daniel Dociu
- Language: English
- Series: The Expanse
- Genre: Science fiction
- Published: March 26, 2019
- Publisher: Orbit Books
- Publication place: United States
- Media type: Print; Audiobook; E-book
- Pages: 544
- ISBN: 978-0-316-33287-3
- OCLC: 1061557414
- Preceded by: Persepolis Rising
- Followed by: Leviathan Falls

Tiamat's Wrath is a science fiction novel by James S. A. Corey, the pen name of Daniel Abraham and Ty Franck, and the eighth book in their series The Expanse. Following the series' tradition of referring to ancient mythology in its titles, the book's title references the Babylonian goddess Tiamat, who took part in the creation of the universe.

== Plot summary ==
Several years after the events of Persepolis Rising, Chrisjen Avasarala dies of old age. She is given a state funeral on Laconia, where James Holden, who remains a captive, pays his respects. Holden is allowed to freely roam the grounds of High Consul Winston Duarte's palace, but can't leave it, and is constantly watched. At her wake he speaks with Avasarala's granddaughter Kajri and Camina Drummer, former president of the defunct Transport Union.

Through the ring gates, Elvi Okoye, her husband Fayez and several other scientists are sent on a Laconian mission to explore the "dead systems", or systems which have gates but no habitable worlds. In the Adro system, they find a planet-sized green diamond which interacts strangely with their sample of active protomolecule, leading Elvi to think that it is an alien record storage device. They are forced by the mission commander to move on to the next system before they can adequately probe it. They arrive in the Tecoma system to find nothing but a neutron star pushed to the edge of stability, with no other matter (not even particles) in the area. The Laconian commander reveals the mission's secret secondary objective to find a system with no functional value, which is to be used as a staging ground to send an antimatter-laden ship through the ring gates to attack the creatures which have been "eating" the ships that disappeared while crossing the ring gates. Duarte intends to use this as an experiment to see if an attack will provoke a response.

In the Sol system, Naomi, working for the underground resistance against Laconia, arrives on a station in the Outer Planets to rendezvous with Bobbie and Alex, operating their stolen Laconian gunship Gathering Storm before leaving again. Bobbie and Alex embark on a covert mission to capture a Laconian freighter near Jupiter carrying supplies and a high-ranking political officer, but the officer and their own spies are caught in the crossfire and killed. Laconia dispatches the Heart of the Tempest to the Jovian system to find and destroy the Storm. Faced with the failure of their primary mission, and the overwhelming odds they now face, Bobbie and Alex are forced to confront the question of whether their fight against Laconia is winnable. Bobbie finds antimatter in the supplies taken from the Laconian freighter, intended as a power source for its magnetic weapon but useful as an extremely potent explosive, and hatches a plan to destroy the Tempest.

On Laconia, Teresa Duarte, the fourteen-year-old daughter of Winston, learns that her father wants to train her to be the next high consul despite his quest for immortality and talks with Holden about his status in Duarte's court. She also sneaks away to talk with a man she met in a mountain cave, whom she calls "Timothy." Meanwhile, Naomi, smuggled onboard on a cargo vessel to safely transit the slow zone without detection, is almost caught in security sweeps. She mingles with the crew of the cargo vessel to avoid discovery by a Laconian political officer and is saved by the chief engineer who knows her from the events of Babylon's Ashes.

The Laconian antimatter experiment, witnessed by Fayez and Elvi (who had argued against it, to little avail) causes the neutron star to collapse into a black hole and emit a gamma-ray burst, which travels through the Tecoma gate and into the slow zone, where it destroys the Tecoma gate and the gate on the opposite side of the ring space, permanently cutting off the inhabitants of that system. Laconia shuts down all travel through the ring gates, stranding Naomi. Duarte tells Teresa that they plan to send another antimatter ship in order to "strike back," but before the attack can be carried out, the aliens (that destroyed the protomolecule builders civilization) attack: everyone across the connected systems experiences the same loss of consciousness that has occurred with previous incidents, and while this is occurring, black tendrils attack the Slow Zone. Elvi and Fayez are wounded and several of their colleagues killed when parts of their ship vanish. Medina Station, the Laconian dreadnought Typhoon and everything inside the ring space is annihilated in an instant, while Elvi and Fayez barely manage to escape.

On Laconia, Duarte, who had willingly become augmented by the protomolecule in his quest for immortality, is strongly affected by the loss of consciousness and becomes catatonic. In desperation, Admiral Anton Trejo, Colonel Jason Ilich, Teresa, and Chief Scientist Paolo Cortázar work to try to cover up the High Consul's condition from the rest of humanity. Holden realizes that something is wrong with Duarte and that Cortázar plans to kill Teresa and take Duarte's place. Elvi and Fayez land on Laconia and despite not being fully healed, Elvi is immediately recruited to try to cure Duarte. Holden attempts to tell them discreetly of Cortázar's plot against Teresa. Teresa again sneaks out to visit "Timothy", who is revealed to be Amos Burton, sent with a pocket nuclear weapon to try to rescue Holden. The Laconian security force finds the two of them and kills Amos, though when they return they cannot find his body. Elvi is shown the secret behind the research that extended Duarte's life: two children who died but were reconstructed, with protomolecule-powered enhancements, by alien repair drones native to Laconia. Elvi tells Teresa, further traumatized by Amos' death, of Cortázar's plot and she tells her father. Another, worse lost-consciousness attack occurs and Elvi realizes that such attacks are what killed the protomolecule builders. She concludes human brains are more resilient and only lose consciousness for a few minutes of time, but now the killers of the protomolecule-builders are experimenting with more effective attacks that will have stronger effects on humanity.

With the death of Medina Station, Naomi travels to Auberon—one of the most prosperous ring worlds—and takes over the underground. After asking Naomi about their plan, Bobbie and Alex set out to kill the Tempest, using a bomb constructed from antimatter and a blind spot in the ship's sensors left over from its battle with the combined fleet in Persepolis Rising. Alex distracts the flagship with the Gathering Storm while Bobbie uses a small shuttle to carry the bomb but their ship is damaged and she is forced to throw the bomb at the Tempest directly in an EVA, destroying the ship but sacrificing herself in the process. Devastated by Bobbie's death, Naomi and Alex return, independently, to the Rocinante, which had been stashed on Freehold.

Realizing that the destruction of the Tempest and everything in the Slow Zone has given the resistance the best chance they will ever have to free humanity from Laconia's rule, Naomi pools together all of her resources to summon hundreds of ships from the other ring worlds for an attack on Laconia's alien ship construction platforms. This fleet launches a surprise attack on the Laconia system, drawing out the last flagship away from the planet so that a small strike force can destroy the shipyards. Duarte, though still comatose, awakens when he is scanned and kills Cortázar. Teresa decides she needs to leave Laconia, uses Amos' evacuation beacon as a call for her rescue and takes Holden from the cells as a bargaining card. Elvi realizes that Holden was the one who convinced Cortázar to kill Teresa but he tells her that it was a plan to betray Cortázar and install Elvi as the head scientist of Laconia. Naomi and Alex's plan succeeds and they destroy the shipyards, then descend to Laconia, following the evacuation signal. Laconian security forces catch up with Holden and Teresa but are killed by Amos, who has been resurrected (complete with the same protomolecule enhancements as the children) by the repair drones. The crew of the Rocinante reunite and Teresa, as the daughter of the high consul, talks the remaining flagship down from killing them. The Rocinante and the resistance fleet leave the Laconia system, leaving it with a single remaining flagship and no ability to build more alien technology. Amos tells Holden that the protomolecule enhancements have allowed him to see things he could not see before, including that the aliens that killed the protomolecule builders now plan to kill all of humanity.

== Characters ==
Main characters in the book include many from earlier in the series, including James Holden, Naomi Nagata, Bobbie Draper, Alex Kamal, Elvi Okoye, and Winston Duarte. The book introduces Duarte's 14-year-old daughter, Teresa, who is being trained as his successor. This is the only book in the series where Holden is not the protagonist, having only chapters in the prologue, epilogue and an interlude.
