= Daniel Abraham (author) =

American writer

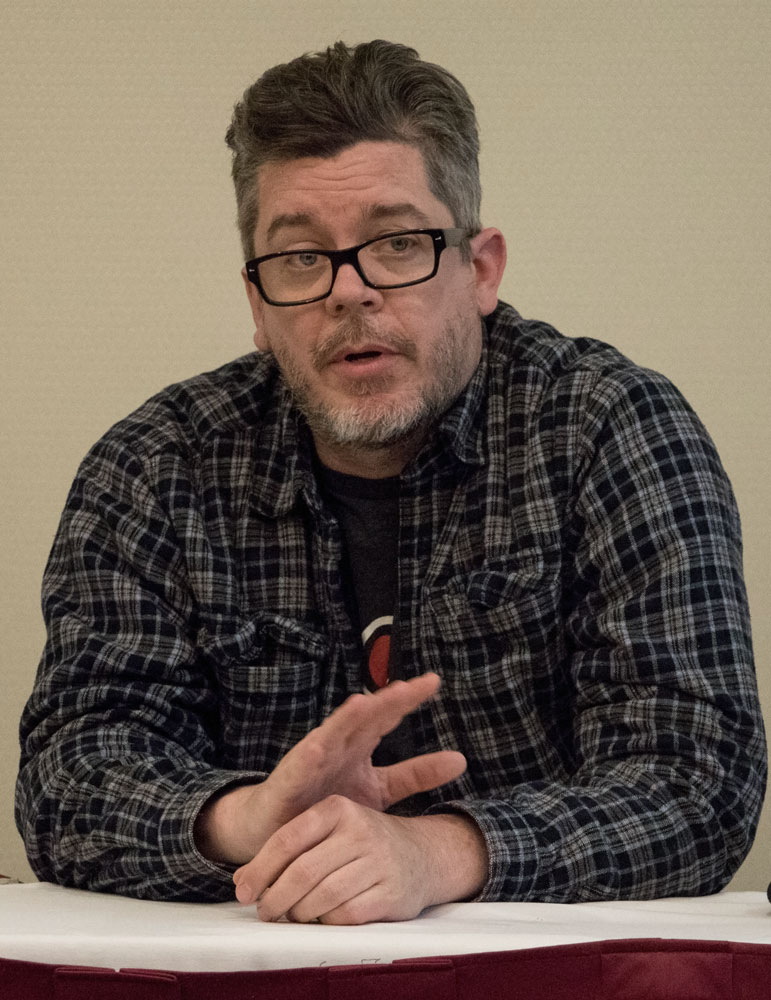
- Abraham at ConFusion 2017
- Born: November 14, 1969 (age 56); Albuquerque, New Mexico, U.S.
- Education: University of New Mexico
- Occupations: Novelist; screenwriter; producer
- Spouse: Katherine Abraham (m. 2002)
- Children: 1
- Writing career
- Pen name: M. L. N. Hanover; James S. A. Corey
- Period: 1996–present
- Genres: Fantasy; Science fiction; Horror
- Notable works: The Dagger and the Coin series; The Expanse series
- Website: danielabraham.com

Daniel James Abraham (born November 14, 1969), pen names M. L. N. Hanover and James S. A. Corey, is an American novelist, comic book writer, screenwriter, and television producer. He is best known as the author of The Long Price Quartet and The Dagger and the Coin fantasy series, and with Ty Franck, as the co-author of The Expanse science fiction series, written under the joint pseudonym James S. A. Corey. The series has been adapted into the television series The Expanse (2015–2022), with both Abraham and Franck serving as writers and producers on the show. He also contributed to Wild Cards anthology series shared universe.

Under the pseudonym M. L. N. Hanover, Abraham is the author of the Black Sun's Daughter urban fantasy series. With Franck, he wrote the Star Wars novel Honor Among Thieves (2014), again as James S. A. Corey. Abraham collaborated with George R. R. Martin and Gardner Dozois to write the science fiction novel Hunter's Run (2007). A frequent collaborator of Martin, Abraham has adapted several of Martin's novels into comic books and graphic novels, such as A Game of Thrones: The Graphic Novel, and he has contributed to Martin's Wild Cards universe.

His short stories have appeared in numerous publications and anthologies, and have been collected in Leviathan Wept and Other Stories (2010). Leviathan Wakes, book one of The Expanse, was nominated for the 2012 Hugo Award for Best Novel and the 2012 Locus Award for Best Science Fiction Novel. His novelette "Flat Diane" was nominated for the Nebula Award. His novelette "The Cambist and Lord Iron: a Fairytale of Economics" was nominated for the Hugo Award and the World Fantasy Award. Abraham is a graduate of Clarion West Writers Workshop 1998.

In 2022, he appeared on Storybound reading from his book Age of Ash while intermittently sharing anecdotes of his upbringing as a young writer.

== Career ==
=== Early work ===
In 1996, Abraham's first short story, "Mixing Rebecca", was published in The Silver Web #13. It was followed by several dozen short stories, novelettes, and novellas, published in anthologies, and magazines like Asimov's Science Fiction and Fantasy & Science Fiction. His novelette "Flat Diane" won the 2005 International Horror Guild Award and was nominated for the 2005 Nebula Award. His novelette "The Cambist and Lord Iron: a Fairytale of Economics" was nominated for the 2008 Hugo Award and the 2008 World Fantasy Award.

=== Wild Cards ===
Abraham made his first contribution to the Wild Cards shared world anthology universe in Deuces Down, published June 25, 2002, with his story "Father Henry's Little Miracle". Abraham contributed the Johnathan Hive story-line to Inside Straight, published on January 21, 2008, by Tor Books as part of a new line of Wild Cards books edited by George R. R. Martin. He wrote the character Johnathan "Bugsy" Tipton-Clarke in Suicide Kings, released on December 22, 2009. A six-issue limited comic book series, Wild Cards: The Hard Call, was written by Abraham with art by Eric Battle. The series was initially published in 2008 by Dabel Brothers, and concluded in 2010 with Dynamite Entertainment taking over as publisher. In 2013 Tor.com published Abraham's new Wild Cards short story, "When We Were Heroes", edited by Martin.

=== Hunter's Run ===
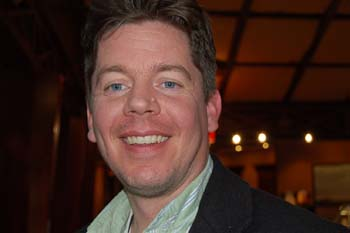
Abraham in 2006

In September 2007, Eos Books published the science fiction novel Hunter's Run, a collaboration between Abraham, George R. R. Martin, and Gardner Dozois. The story began as an untitled novella written by Dozois and submitted to Martin for critique in 1977. Years later, Dozois was suffering from writer's block and asked Martin to help him finish the story. In 2002, Martin and Dozois decided to bring in a third author to finish the novella, asking Abraham to overhaul the 20,000 word manuscript and write an ending. The resulting novella, "Shadow Twin", was released online on Sci Fiction in 2004, and later reprinted in Asimov's Science Fiction and published as a chapbook by Subterranean Press. The novel version was suggested by Martin, and retitled Hunter's Run to avoid confusion with the novella version. The writers "threw everything out" to write the novel, each doing passes on the manuscript, with Dozois putting the finishing touches to the novel.

=== The Expanse ===
In 2011, Abraham launched a new science fiction series, The Expanse, co-authored with Ty Franck under the joint pseudonym James S. A. Corey. The books are based on a role-playing game set up by Franck, who had developed a science fiction universe that spanned the Solar System. After Franck moved to New Mexico and became part of the science fiction writing community, he set up several campaigns of the game, one that included Abraham as a player. Abraham was impressed by the amount of research and world-building Franck had done and asked to write a novel set in the game's universe. Franck agreed and decided to split the proceeds of the book with Abraham for his part in writing from Franck's notes and outline. After reading Abraham's first chapters, Franck decided to become more involved with the writing. The pair collaborated on the overarching plot, meeting weekly to outline chapters, with Abraham focusing on structure and prose, and Franck developing the story and world. They alternate chapters, writing for different characters each, with Abraham writing Miller, Melba, Avasarala, Bull, and Prax, then swap and rewrite the other's work. By the end of the process, Abraham has stated it would be hard to identify which line was written by which author.

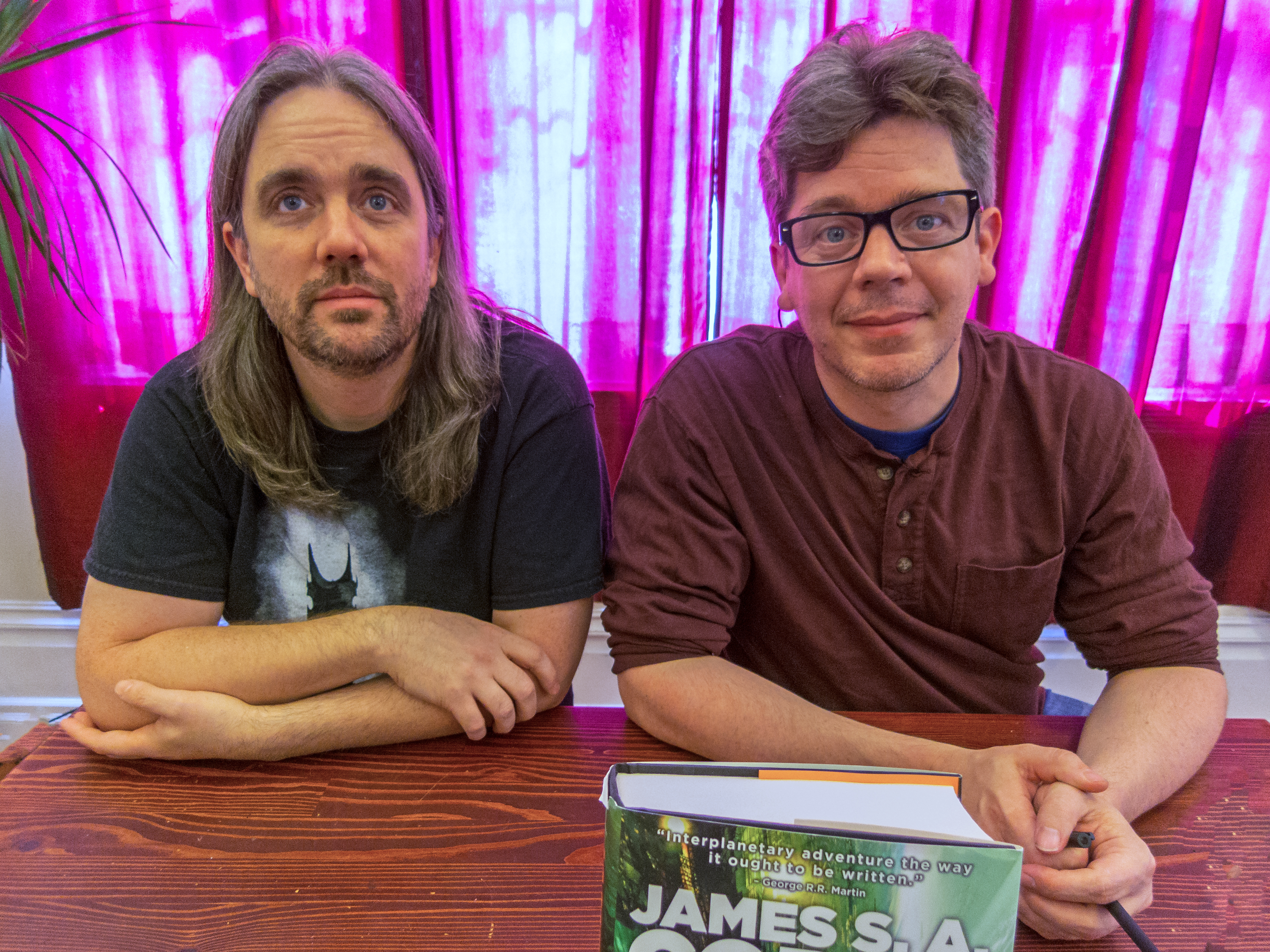
James S.A. Corey (Ty Franck, left, and Daniel Abraham) in 2014

The first book, Leviathan Wakes, was published in June 2011 by Orbit, Abraham's publishing house for his fantasy series The Dagger and the Coin. The novel was nominated for the Hugo Award in 2012 and received acclaim from the science fiction community. A prequel short story titled "The Butcher of Anderson Station" was published in October 2011 and provides background to one of the secondary characters of Leviathan Wakes, Colonel Fred Johnson.

Its sequel, Caliban's War, was published in June 2012. The novel expanded the number of point of view characters from two to four, which according to Abraham, allowed for more freedom to explore the characters' situations. The novel was followed by a novella, Gods of Risk, published in September 2012. The story takes place between the second and third books of the series, and is set in the same time period as the main novels but follows a separate story-line. A second prequel short story, "Drive", was published in the anthology Edge of Infinity in November 2012, set decades before the first novel.

The third book, Abaddon's Gate, was released in June 2013, and won the Locus Award for Best Science Fiction Novel. A second prequel novella, The Churn, was published in April 2014 and features the main series character Amos Burton.

The fourth book, Cibola Burn, was published in June 2014, the first novel in the series to be released in hardcover. The fifth book, Nemesis Games, was released in June 2015, and was praised by Andrew Liptak of io9 as "Corey's Empire Strikes Back." It was followed by the novella The Vital Abyss in October 2015.

The sixth book, Babylon's Ashes, was released in December 2016, the seventh, Persepolis Rising, in December 2017; and the eighth Tiamat's Wrath, in March 2019. The final installation, Leviathan Falls, was released in November 2021.

=== A Game of Thrones graphic novels ===
Abraham adapted George R. R. Martin's A Game of Thrones, the first novel of A Song of Ice and Fire, into a comic book series. The 24-issue series featured art by Tommy Patterson and colors by Ivan Nunes, and was published by Dynamite Entertainment from September 21, 2011, to July 30, 2014. It was collected as four hardcover graphic novels by Bantam Books, the first volume featuring a preface by Martin. In 2014, Abraham stated that he would not be adapting A Clash of Kings.

=== Honor Among Thieves ===
In New York Comic Con 2013, Del Rey Books announced a new Star Wars novel by Abraham and Ty Franck, writing as James S. A. Corey. The book would be a standalone novel focusing on Han Solo, set between Star Wars and The Empire Strikes Back. Honor Among Thieves was released on March 4, 2014, as the second installment of the Empire and Rebellion series. The writers watched A New Hope and The Empire Strikes Back several times to capture Han Solo's voice while writing the book. A short story written by Corey titled "Silver and Scarlet" was included in the book as well as published in Star Wars Insider #148. A month after the novel was published, the Star Wars Expanded Universe was declared non-canon and renamed Star Wars Legends after the Disney acquisition of Lucasfilm, making Honor Among Thieves the last Expanded Universe publication.

=== The Expanse television series ===
In September 2013, Alcon Television Group acquired the rights to the Expanse novels to be developed as a television series. Syfy gave a straight-to-series order for a 10-episode first season of the show in April 2014. The series premiered on demand on November 23, 2015, and on Syfy on December 14, 2015. The Expanse was developed by Mark Fergus & Hawk Ostby, who wrote the pilot and serve as writers, executive producers, and showrunners alongside Naren Shankar. Writing for a second season commenced in May 2015, before the first season aired, and was officially ordered for in December 2015, with an increased order of 13 episodes. SyFy aired the second-season premiere on February 1, 2017. Abraham and Ty Franck, who write the novels under the joint pseudonym James S. A. Corey, serve as writers and producers on the show. They co-wrote the seventh episode, "Windmills".

In November 2024, it was announced that a production company Expanding Universe co-founded by Abraham with Ty Franck, Breck Eisner and Naren Shankar has a development deal with Amazon MGM Studios, with their first project, television adaptation of The Captive's War trilogy, being co-written and co-executive produced by Abraham.

== Personal life ==
Abraham lives in Albuquerque, New Mexico, with his wife Katherine Abraham and their daughter Scarlet.

== Works ==
=== The Long Price Quartet series ===
- A Shadow in Summer (March 7, 2006)
- A Betrayal in Winter (August 21, 2007)
- An Autumn War (July 22, 2008)
- The Price of Spring (July 21, 2009)

==== Omnibus editions ====
- Shadow and Betrayal (collects first and second books) (January 21, 2010)
- Seasons of War (collects third and fourth books) (also published as The Price of War) (January 21, 2010)
- The Long Price Quartet (collecting all books) (November 13, 2018)

=== Black Sun's Daughter series ===
- Unclean Spirits (as M. L. N. Hanover) (December 2, 2008)
- Darker Angels (as M. L. N. Hanover) (September 29, 2009)
- Vicious Grace (as M. L. N. Hanover) (November 30, 2010)
- Killing Rites (as M. L. N. Hanover) (November 29, 2011)
- Graveyard Child (as M. L. N. Hanover) (April 30, 2013)

=== The Dagger and the Coin series ===
- The Dragon's Path (April 7, 2011)
- The King's Blood (May 22, 2012)
- The Tyrant's Law (May 14, 2013)
- The Widow's House (August 5, 2014)
- The Spider's War (March 8, 2016)

=== The Expanse series ===
(Written with Ty Franck under the joint pseudonym James S. A. Corey.)

=== The Kithamar Trilogy ===
- Age of Ash (February 15, 2022)
- Blade of Dream (July 23, 2023)
- Judge of Worlds (February 2, 2027)

=== Stand-alone novels ===
- Hunter's Run (with Gardner Dozois and George R. R. Martin) (2007)
- Inside Straight (with other authors, edited by George R. R. Martin) (Wild Cards mosaic novel) (2008)
- Suicide Kings (with other authors, edited by George R. R. Martin) (Wild Cards mosaic novel) (2009)
- "The Incident of the Harrowmoor Dogs" (Novella) (2013)

=== Tie-in fiction ===
- Star Wars: Honor Among Thieves (with Ty Franck as James S. A. Corey) (Star Wars: Empire and Rebellion, book 2) (2014)

=== Graphic fiction ===
- A Game of Thrones: The Graphic Novel #1–24 (September 2011–July 2014)
  - Volume 1 (collects #1–6, with George R. R. Martin and Tommy Patterson, hc, 240 pages, Bantam/Dynamite Entertainment, 2012)
  - Volume 2 (collects #7–12, with George R. R. Martin and Tommy Patterson, hc, 240 pages, Bantam/Dynamite Entertainment, 2013)
  - Volume 3 (collects #13–18, with George R. R. Martin and Tommy Patterson, hc, 224 pages, Bantam/Dynamite Entertainment, 2014)
  - Volume 4 (collects #19–24, with George R. R. Martin and Tommy Patterson, hc, 208 pages, Bantam/Dynamite Entertainment, 2015)
- George R. R. Martin's Wild Cards: The Hard Call #1–6 (6-issue limited series, with Eric Battle, April 2008–July 2010, collected in George R. R. Martin's Wild Cards: The Hard Call, hc, 160 pages, Dynamite, 2011)
- George R. R. Martin's Fevre Dream #1–10 (10-issue limited series, with George R. R. Martin and Rafa Lopez, March–December 2010, collected in George R. R. Martin's Fevre Dream, hc, 256 pages, Avatar Press, 2011)
- Skin Trade #1–4 (4-issue limited series, with George R. R. Martin and Mike Wolfer, July–December 2013, collected in George R. R. Martin's Skin Trade, tpb, 104 pages, Avatar Press, 2014)

==== Collections ====
- Leviathan Wept and Other Stories (May 31, 2010)

== Filmography ==
=== Television ===
Year	Title	Credited as		Notes	Ref.
Year	Title	Writer	Producer	Notes	Ref.
2015–22	The Expanse	Yes	Yes	Based on his Expanse series of novels. Writer (12 episodes), producer.	

== Selected accolades ==
Year	Award	Category	Title of work	Result	Ref.
2005	International Horror Guild Award	Mid-length Fiction	"Flat Diane"	Won	
2005	Nebula Award	Best Novelette	"Flat Diane"	Nominated	
2008	World Fantasy Award	Short Fiction	"The Cambist and Lord Iron: a Fairytale of Economics"	Nominated	
2008	Hugo Award	Best Novelette	"The Cambist and Lord Iron: a Fairytale of Economics"	Nominated	
2012	Hugo Award	Best Novel	Leviathan Wakes (with Ty Franck as James S. A. Corey)	Nominated	
2012	Locus Award	Best Science Fiction Novel	Leviathan Wakes (with Ty Franck as James S. A. Corey)	Nominated	
2014	Locus Award	Best Science Fiction Novel	Abaddon's Gate (with Ty Franck as James S. A. Corey)	Won	
