= Sal Tarbut Strauss =

Sal Tarbut Strauss (Hebrew: סל תרבות שטראוס) is an educational program founded in Israel by Avner Strauss. It offers cultural programming for kindergarten, grade school, and high school children all over Israel.

Sal Tarbut Strauss

Sal Tarbut Strauss encompasses five areas of arts and culture:

- Drama
- Dance
- Music
- Visual arts
- Media arts and crafts

Sal Tarbut Strauss has provided cultural enrichment to children since 1987, reaching over three million students, exposing them to music, theater and visual arts. Most of these programs were approved and recommended by the Ministry of Education, and conform to their curriculum. Sal Tarbut Strauss has produced many educational theater shows, working with the non-profit organization A.V.I. (The Organization for Israeli Stage Arts).

== History ==
Sal Tarbut Strauss began operating in 1987 in Jerusalem and moved to Tel Aviv around 1990.

In its early years, Sal Tarbut Strauss put emphasis on introducing students to aspects of 20th-century American music that were relatively unfamiliar in Israel. These include traditional and modern day blues, bluegrass, folk, jazz, and early rock and roll. Sal Tarbut Strauss has supplied and supported thousands of shows notably thru Strauss Mifaley Tarbut Ltd. Omanut Laam, Sal Tarbut Artzi, Keren Karev, and the Israeli Ministry of Education.

The program works all over Israel and reaches places the Israeli Ministry program of artistic and cultural enrichment, run by the Matnasim company Sal Tarbut Artzi, does not function.

== Goals ==
- Introduction to art
- To present artistic cultural concepts/values to children and teenagers
- To present the main genres and styles in art
- To present the tools used in art – musical instruments, props, masks and puppets used in theater, basic materials in plastic arts, cameras in photography and cinema, etc.
- Introduction to the tools of art criticism and analysis, aesthetics and forming personal tastes
- Introduction to classic works and the great artists in history and their works
- Workshops and activities that bring children and teenagers together with professionals at the top of their field

== Culture ==
- Getting to know your own cultural identity, getting to know other cultural identities
- Pluralism in art – art is not a barrier between cultures, but a dialogue between cultures that can bring people from different cultures together.

== Artistic and cultural enrichment ==
- Creating challenges such as abstract thought, developing the imagination, analytic thought, creativity, etc.
- Utilizing art to trigger thinking about societal issues, ecology, environmental issues, violence, the Holocaust, cultural roots, personal commitment, personal hygiene, etc.
- Utilizing art to trigger thinking about science, the water cycle in nature, illusions of movement, persistence of vision, fluid mechanics (e.g. communicating vessels), basic properties of materials (hardness, elasticity, flexibility, etc.).
