= EarlySense =

Israeli medical device company

- Company type: Private
- Industry: Medical Technology
- Founded: 2004
- Founders: Dr. Danny Lange, Yossi Gross, Avner Halperin
- Headquarters: Ramat Gan, Israel, Waltham, Massachusetts
- Area served: Worldwide
- Key people: Matt Johnson (CEO)
- Website: earlysense.com

EarlySense was an Israeli medical device company with offices in the United States. It has sold its proprietary contact-free continuous monitoring technology to Hill-Rom, now Baxter International.

== History ==
The company was founded in 2004 by Dr. Danny Lange, Yossi Gross, and Avner Halperin. The CEO is Matt Johnson.

The product has two components: a sensor that is placed under a mattress and a software application. The company sells a version of the product designed for use in hospitals that received 510K marketing clearance from the FDA in 2009, meaning that it is equivalent to devices already on the market. It also received the CE mark in Europe. In this system, the sensor measures changes in pressure applied to it through the mattress, and transmits the measurements to the software, which converts them to heart rate, breathing rate, and motion. The application can be used by nurses to monitor patients in their ward remotely; it can provide alerts if patients try to get out of bed, and can provide alerts that a patient needs to be turned in order to avoid the development of pressure ulcers.

In September 2015 the company launched a version of the product for people to use at home to monitor their sleep; in this system the desktop application is replaced by a smartphone app. EarlySense also provided OEM services to other companies that market the system under their own brands.

The company also offers contact-free continuous monitoring (CFCM) sensors for use in healthcare settings. The sensors allow wireless monitoring of patients.

== See also ==
- Science and technology in Israel
