= Paskins =

Paskins is a surname. Notable people with the surname include:

- Graeme Paskins (born 1972), English cricketer
- Tony Paskins (1927–2019), Australian rugby league footballer

== See also ==
- Parkins
- Paskin
