= USS Abner Read (DD-769) =

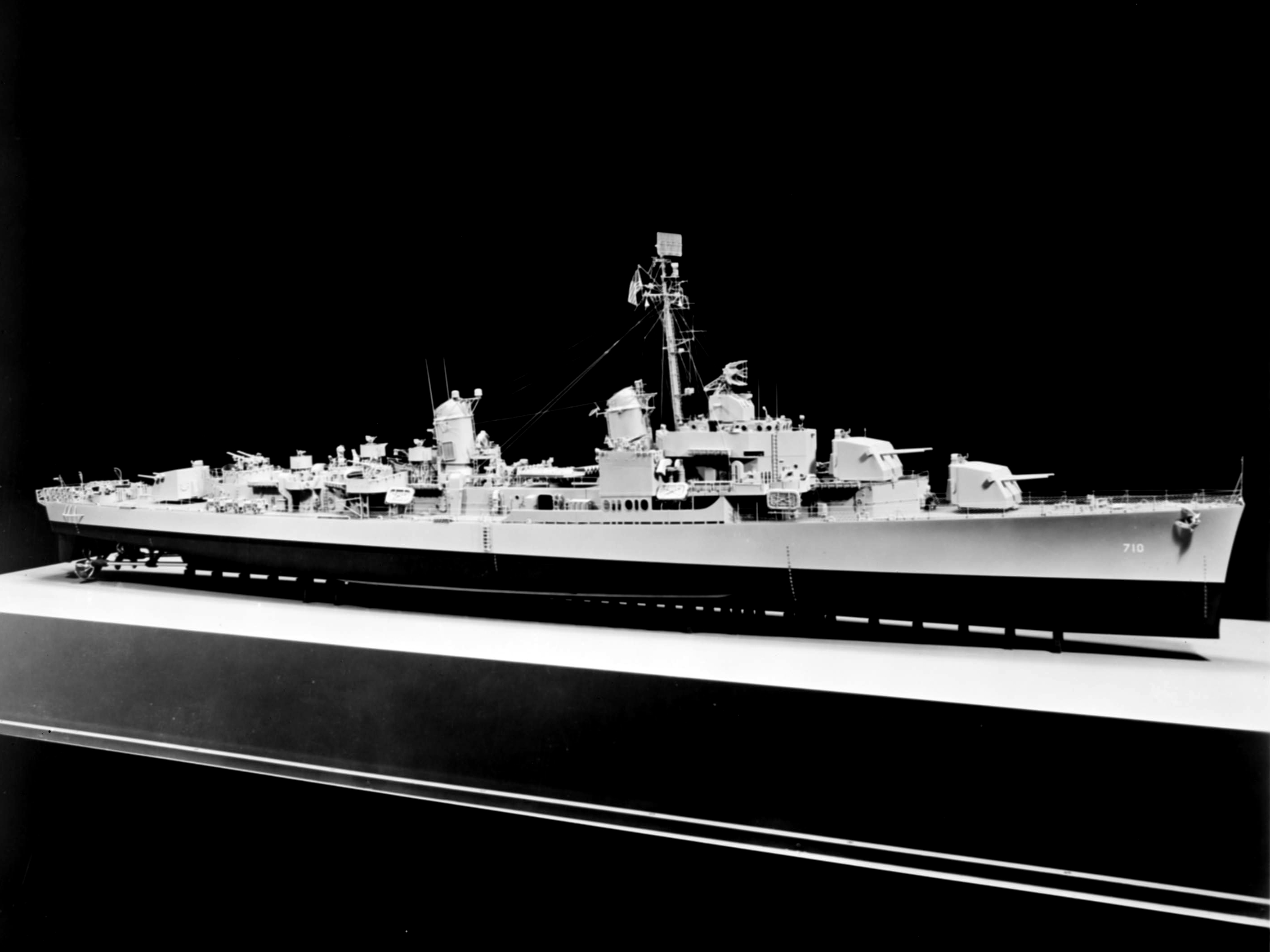
- Model of USS Gearing (DD-710), a Gearing-class destroyer, Abner Read would have been of this class. Note that the after set of torpedo tubes has already been replaced by a 40 mm quadruple mount in this model.

History

United States
- Name: Abner Read
- Namesake: Lieutenant commander Abner Read
- Builder: Bethlehem Shipbuilding Corporation, San Francisco, California
- Laid down: 21 May 1944
- Stricken: 13 September 1946
- Identification: Hull symbol: DD-769
- Fate: Cancelled 12 September 1946 and scrapped on slip

General characteristics (as planned)
- Class & type: Gearing-class destroyer
- Displacement: 2,425 long tons (2,464 t) (standard); 3,460 long tons (3,520 t) (full)
- Length: 390 ft 6 in (119.0 m) (overall)
- Beam: 40 ft 10 in (12.45 m)
- Draft: 14 ft 4 in (4.37 m)
- Installed power: 60,000 shp (45,000 kW)
- Propulsion: 2 × geared turbines; 2 × propellers
- Speed: 35 kn (65 km/h; 40 mph)
- Range: 4,500 nmi (8,300 km; 5,200 mi) at 20 kn (37 km/h; 23 mph)
- Complement: 336 officers and enlisted
- Armament: 6 × 5 in (127 mm)/38 caliber guns; 12 × 40 mm (1.6 in) Bofors AA guns; 11 × 20 mm (0.79 in) Oerlikon AA cannons; 10 × 21 in (533 mm) torpedo tubes; 6 × depth charge projectors; 2 × depth charge tracks

USS Abner Read (DD-769) was a planned United States Navy Gearing-class destroyer laid down during World War II but never completed. The ship was to be the second ship named for Abner Read (1821–1863), a United States Navy officer killed during the American Civil War. She was assigned the name during construction when the first Abner Read (DD-526), a Fletcher-class destroyer, was sunk by a kamikaze during the Battle of Leyte, 1 November 1944.

== Construction ==
Abner Read was laid down by the Bethlehem Shipbuilding Corporation at San Francisco, California on 21 May 1944. The end of World War II in August 1945 resulted in the termination of the contract for her construction on 12 September 1946 or 13 September 1946. She was stricken from the Naval Vessel Register on 13 September 1946 and scrapped on the building ways. Scrapping was completed in January 1947.
