= Laskin =

Laskin is a surname, and may refer to:

- Avner Laskin (born 1969), Israeli chef and restaurateur
- Bora Laskin (1912–1984), Canadian jurist
- Daniel Laskin (1924–2021), American surgeon and educator
- David Laskin (born 1953), American writer
- John B. Laskin, Canadian judge
- John I. Laskin (born 1943), Canadian judge
- Julia Laskin (born 1967), Russian–American chemist
- Larissa Laskin, American television actress
- Lee B. Laskin (1936–2024), American attorney, politician and judge
- Saul Laskin (1918–2008), Canadian politician
- William Laskin (born 1953), Canadian luthier and musician
