= The Dagger and the Coin =

Series of fantasy novels by Daniel Abraham

- The Dragon's Path (2011); The King's Blood (2012); The Tyrant's Law (2013); The Widow's House (2014); The Spider's War (2016)
- Author: Daniel Abraham
- Country: United States
- Language: English
- Genre: High fantasy
- Publisher: Orbit Books
- Published: 2011 – 2016
- Media type: Print (Paperback)
- No. of books: 5

The Dagger and the Coin is an epic fantasy series by Daniel Abraham, published between 2011 and 2016. The series explores the acquisition and exercise of power by individuals ill-prepared for it, persistence of institutions beyond their usefulness, and the intersection of ideology, economics, and fear. These themes are reflected in the series title, contrasting violence ("the dagger") with economic power ("the coin").

== Plot summary ==
=== The Dragon's Path (2011) ===
The Antean Empire conquers the city of Vanai, setting off political upheaval, economic disruption, and the rise of the insecure knight Geder Palliako. As banker Cithrin bel Sarcour struggles to protect financial power during wartime, soldiers, nobles, and performers are drawn into plots involving succession, money, and the first stirrings of the cult of the Spider Goddess.

=== The King's Blood (2012) ===
Civil war erupts in Antea as Geder rises to power under the influence of the Spider Goddess's priests. While armies clash and noble alliances fracture, Cithrin becomes trapped between finance and politics, and those opposed to the cult begin to realize how deeply it has embedded itself in imperial rule.

=== The Tyrant's Law (2013) ===
Geder expands Antea's wars abroad, believing conquest will bring peace, while the cult's power grows with every victory. Opponents work in secret to undermine him, ancient truths about the world begin to surface, and long-slumbering forces awaken as the cost of empire becomes impossible to ignore.

=== The Widow's House (2014) ===
As resistance to Antea spreads, former allies and enemies maneuver for control through economics, espionage, and open war. Geder's obsession with control deepens, dragons return to the world, and the struggle shifts from preventing tyranny to surviving it.

=== The Spider's War (2016) ===
The final confrontation unfolds as the truth behind the Spider Goddess and her priesthood is exposed. Political, military, and personal conflicts converge in Camnipol, forcing characters to choose between loyalty, belief, and survival as the empire and its gods face collapse.

== Novels ==
No.	Title	Release date	ISBN
1	The Dragon's Path	April 7, 2011	978-0-316-08068-2
2	The King's Blood	May 22, 2012	978-0-316-08077-4
3	The Tyrant's Law	May 14, 2013	978-0-316-08070-5
4	The Widow's House	August 5, 2014	978-0-316-20398-2
5	The Spider's War	March 8, 2016	978-0-316-20405-7

== Response ==
Publishers Weekly wrote Abraham's "deft and light hand" in The Dragon's Path "explores the fantasy-world assumptions that most authors take for granted, telling an enjoyable and genuinely innovative adventure story". EBR gave The Dragon's Path five stars in 2011. In a 2014 follow-up, also five stars, The Tyrant's Law was lauded for its "solid writing, steady world-building, and great pacing".

In 2022, The Dragon's Path was reviewed favorably by Grimdark Magazine. A Grimdark review of The King's Blood explained the novels do not work "as standalone[s] so might not be suited for fantasy fans who want a quick-fix, adrenaline rush".
