= Flat Diane =

2004 novelette by Daniel Abraham

"Flat Diane" is a novelette by American author Daniel Abraham. It first appeared in The Magazine of Fantasy & Science Fiction in October 2004, and was nominated for the 2005 Nebula Award, and won the 2005 International Horror Guild Award. Jeff and Ann VanderMeer included the story in their 2011 reprint anthology The Weird.

Inspired by The Flat Stanley Project, it tells the story of a father who helps his daughter create a paper outline of herself. They send the outline to friends, with instructions to take a picture of themselves with it, send back the picture, and send the outline on to another friend. The daughter, Diane, begins to show signs of knowing things that only the paper outline "Flat Diane" could have witnessed, and shortly after Diane begins having nightmares of torture and molestation the father receives photographs showing that Flat Diane has "fallen into the wrong hands".
