= USS Bancroft (DD-598) =

Benson-class destroyer

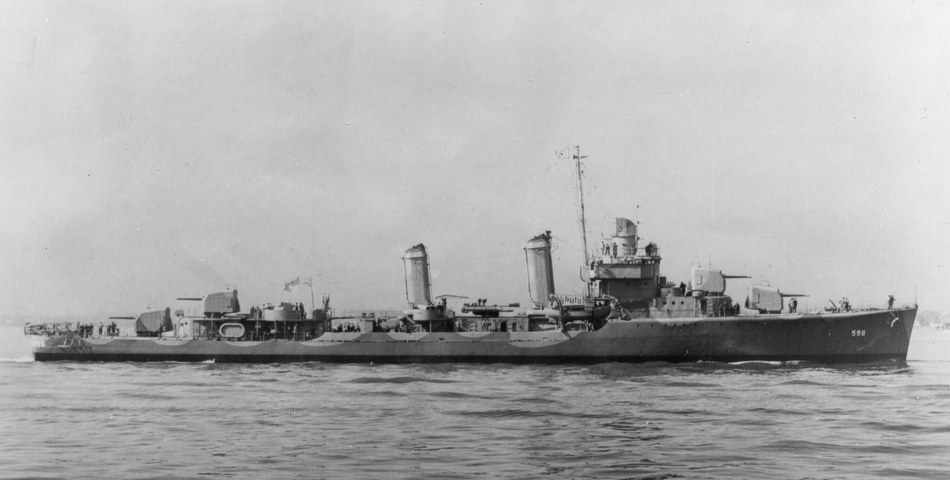
- USS Bancroft (DD-598) off Boston in April 1942

History

United States
- Name: USS Bancroft (DD-598)
- Namesake: George Bancroft
- Builder: Fore River Shipyard
- Launched: 31 December 1941
- Commissioned: 30 April 1942
- Decommissioned: 1 February 1946
- Fate: Scrapped in 1973

General characteristics
- Class & type: Benson-class destroyer
- Displacement: 1,620 tons
- Length: 347 ft 10 in (106.02 m)
- Beam: 36 ft 1 in (11.00 m)
- Draught: 17 ft 4 in (5.28 m)
- Speed: 35 knots
- Complement: 276
- Armament: 5 × 5 in (130 mm)/38 guns, 10 × 21-inch (533 mm) tt.

USS Bancroft (DD-598) was a Benson-class destroyer in the United States Navy during World War II. She was the third ship named for George Bancroft.

Bancroft was launched 31 December 1941 by Bethlehem Steel Company, Quincy, Massachusetts; sponsored by Mrs. Hester Bancroft Berry, great-granddaughter of George Bancroft; commissioned 30 April 1942 and reported to the Pacific Fleet.

== Service history ==
Bancroft arrived at Dutch Harbor, Alaska, 17 September 1942 and remained in the Aleutian Islands until late August 1943, supporting the occupation of Amchitka (12 January 1943), Attu (11 May – 2 June), and Kiska (15 August) Islands. On 18 August 1943, she came to the assistance of the destroyer USS Abner Read (DD-526), which had had her stern blown off near Kiska by a Japanese mine and was without power and in danger of drifting ashore or onto other mines, and towed Abner Read out of immediate danger.

Between September 1943 and July 1945 she was a workhorse in fire support, screening, and escort duties in the Wake Island raid (5–6 October 1943); Tarawa, Gilbert Islands raid (18 September) and occupation (20 November – 6 December); Kwajalein, Marshall Islands, seizure (31 January – 16 February 1944); Mille Atoll, Marshall Islands, landings (17–18 March); Palau and Woleai raid (29 March – 2 April); Hollandia operation (21–24 April); Truk-Satawan-Ponape raid (28–30 April), Wotje Atoll, Marshall Islands, Mid (23 May); Saipan occupation (25 June – 22 July); Maloelap Atoll, Marshall Islands, raid (8 August); Philippine Islands operations (19 February – 12 April 1945); and the Borneo operations (1 May – 5 July).

Between September and November 1945, Bancroft escorted convoys between the Philippine Islands, Okinawa, and Japan.

On 9 December 1945, she arrived at Norfolk, Virginia and went out of commission in reserve at Charleston, South Carolina, 1 February 1946. She was scrapped in 1973.

== Awards ==
Bancroft received eight battle stars for her World War II service.
