= Abner (disambiguation) =

Abner is the uncle of Saul and commander-in-chief of his army in the Bible.

Abner may also refer to:

- Abner (name), including a list of people and fictional characters with the given name or surname
- Abner, North Carolina, an unincorporated community
- Abner, Texas, an unincorporated community
- Abner Pond, Plymouth, Massachusetts
- Abner Records, record label
- ABNER (detonator), the code name for the neutron generating trigger used in the Little Boy atomic bomb; see Urchin (detonator)
- Abner (computer), an early electronic computer used by the National Security Agency

== See also ==
- Li'l Abner (1934-1977), comic strip
