= The Cambist and Lord Iron =

The Cambist and Lord Iron: A Fairy Tale of Economics is a 2007 novelette by Daniel Abraham. It was originally published in the anthology Logorrhea: Good Words Make Good Stories, and subsequently republished in The Year's Best Fantasy and Horror 2008: 21st Annual Collection (2008), in Fantasy: The Best of the Year (2008), in The Best Science Fiction and Fantasy of the Year Volume Two (2008), and in Lightspeed (2013). An audio version was made available via PodCastle in 2009.

== Synopsis ==
Olaf Neddelsohn is a cambist who leads a quiet life until he comes to the attention of Lord Iron, a brutal and decadent aristocrat who sets him seemingly impossible challenges for his amusement.

Lord Iron makes three demands of Olaf Nedelsohn: First, Lord Iron demands that Olaf exchange a thousand units of an obscure currency, threatening to revoke his cambist license if he fails to make the exchange in 24 hours or assigns an arbitrary value to the bills.

The next day, Olaf states that the bills are worth a bit less than ten pounds, as that was all the market could bear. He explains that currency is a good that can be bought and sold just like any other. One could just as easily say that the baker buys shillings with bread. When a customer gives Olaf pound sterling in exchange for francs, what Olaf is really doing is buying the pounds for francs. To price the obscure bills given to him by Lord Iron, Olaf obtained quotes from various establishments and sold them to the highest bidder: a glassblower shop that intended to use them for wrapping paper.

Amused, the Lord Iron accepts the trade and leaves.

Six months later, the Lord Iron summons Olaf as his champion in a bet between with a Lord Eichan. Lord Iron claims, from his experience with the cambist, that the value of anything can be expressed in terms of any other. Olaf is given one week to value a day in the life of the king, as described in terms of days in the life of prisoner of the crown. His valuation, and justification, will be presented to three judges - and the loser will be killed.

For the first four days, Olaf is unable to come up with any satisfactory valuation scheme. In fear of his upcoming death, he indulges in tobacco, beer, and unhealthy food, reasoning that he wouldn't live long enough to justify worrying about the medical consequences. At this thought, a realization hits him.

At him judgement, Olaf starts by explaining revealed preference theory: one's actions reveal what they truly care about, even if they claim to value something else. He thus determines that a day in the life of the king is worth nineteen and three-quarter hours of a prisoner of the crown, reasoning that the king is well known to live a sedentary life filled with liquor and rich food, which are well known to reduce lifespan. A prisoner, however, eats simply and is forced to exercise. The king, despite having all the power to choose otherwise, must value an additional day of his life less than the value he gets from indulging.

The eldest judge objects that the king's life cannot be of lesser value than a prisoner. Olaf retorts that he was not asked to value the life of the king, but rather a day. Though the king's life is more valuable, his days are lesser: for he has the power to choose to trade his lifespan for luxury, while the prisoner is forced to live simply. Since the king makes the exchange, his days must not be worth as much to him, even as his life fills with pleasures that he values more.

The judges end up ruling in Olaf's favor, and Lord Eichan is killed. Lord Iron then tells Olaf that the ruling was not unanimous, but was decided by the fact that the king himself (who, Olaf only now realizes, was the eldest judge) was convinced by the argument.

Months later, Olaf's trials have begun to make his usual adventure novels seem contrived. Lord Iron visits his bedchamber, and asks him to come to his house in a month, to tell him the fair price of a man's soul.

After only a day of deliberation, Olaf has his answer. He explains to Lord Iron that wealth is not the same thing of money - it is a measure of value, a thing that is created by trade but is not itself traded. He realized that Lord Iron's soul is not, in fact, valuable. As the aristocrat is known for his sadistic acts, the devil has no need to buy his soul, for he has rights to it already. Thus, Lord Iron must be looking to buy a soul, not to sell his. Olaf offers to trade his life with that of Lord Iron's.

The Lord Iron, in a different identity, lives out a simple life as the cambist replacing Olaf. Olaf uses Lord Iron's fortune to travel the world, and write adventure novels about a protagonist named "Lord Iron".

== Reception ==
Cambist was a finalist for the 2008 Hugo Award for Best Novelette and the 2008 World Fantasy Award for Best Short Story.

Black Gate called it "amazing" and "a fable of economics", and the SF Site described it as "splendid" and "delightful", while Strange Horizons considered it "brilliantly intellectual", but stated that it "could be straight historical fiction for all the use it makes of its vaguely fantastic setting." Steven Levitt noted that, despite agreeing with Olaf's response to Lord Iron's first challenge, he was unable to apply standard economic reasoning to the second and third challenges.
