= Douglas Abner =

Brazilian footballer (born 1996)

Personal information
- Full name: Douglas Abner Almeida dos Santos
- Date of birth: 30 January 1996 (age 30)
- Place of birth: Brasília, DF, Brazil
- Height: 1.75 m (5 ft 9 in)
- Position: Forward

Youth career
- 2009–2012: Santos
- 2013–2014: Corinthians
- 2014–2015: Boavista

Senior career*
Years	Team	Apps	(Gls)
2014–2018	Boavista	7	(1)
2016	→ Académico de Viseu (loan)	4	(0)
2017	→ Salgueiros (loan)	6	(0)
2018	Cesarense	14	(1)
2019	AFK Linköping	3	(0)
2019	Linköping City	7	(1)
2020–2021	Ideal	25	(11)
2021	União Santarém	4	(0)
2021–2022	Benfica Castelo Branco	18	(5)
2022	UE Santa Coloma	10	(1)
- * Club domestic league appearances and goals as of 19:04, 16 February 2024

Douglas Abner Almeida dos Santos, known as Douglas Abner (born 30 January 1996), is a Brazilian professional footballer who plays as a forward. He is currently a free agent.

== Career ==
=== Boavista ===
Douglas Abner made his Primeira Liga debut for Boavista on 1 November 2015 as a second-half substitute in a 0–1 loss to Marítimo. He scored his first goal for the club against Vitória on 28 November 2015, scoring in the 42nd minute.

=== Académico de Viseu ===
Douglas made his league debut for Académico against FC Porto B on 14 August 2016.

=== Salgueiros ===
Douglas made his league debut for Salgueiros against Marítimo B on 2 April 2017.

=== Cesarense ===
Douglas made his league debut for Cesarense against Paredes on 3 February 2019. He scored his first league goal for the club against Espinho on 28 April 2019, scoring in the 57th minute.

=== Linköping City ===
Douglas made his league debut for Linköping City against Sandviken on 11 August 2019. He scored his first goal for the club against Gefle on 28 September 2019, scoring in the 52nd minute.

=== Ideal ===
Douglas scored on his debut for Ideal, scoring against Oleiros on 2 February 2020, scoring in the 67th minute.

=== União Santarém ===
Douglas made his league debut for União Santarém against Oriental Dragon on 14 August 2021.

=== Benfica Castelo Branco ===
Douglas made his league debut for Benfica Castelo Branco against Fontinhas on 28 November 2021. He scored his first league goal for the club against Praiense on 16 January 2022, scoring in the 90th+4th minute.

=== UE Santa Coloma ===
Douglas made his league debut for UE Santa Coloma against Ordino on 2 October 2022. He scored his first league goal for the club against Sant Julià on 9 October 2022, scoring in the 83rd minute.
