= Elaine Avner =

American astronomer

Elaine Sweital Avner (June 26, 1938 – June 10, 2017) was an American astronomer and computer-assisted instruction developer who worked for many years at the University of Illinois at Urbana–Champaign.

Elaine Sweital was originally from Philadelphia, was the top student in her year at the Philadelphia High School for Girls, and won a Philadelphia City scholarship to the University of Pennsylvania, where she graduated Phi Beta Kappa. She first came to the University of Illinois at Urbana–Champaign as a graduate student and Woodrow Wilson Fellow in astronomy, earning a master's degree in 1962 and a Ph.D. in 1965, and marrying Richard Allen Avner, whom she met when he was a psychology graduate student at the University of Illinois. Her doctoral dissertation was The Influence of The Magellanic Clouds on The Galaxy.

She became a faculty member in astronomy at Troy University, and was named a Fellow of the American Association for the Advancement of Science in 1966. She returned to the University of Illinois, in the astronomy department, but in 1967 shifted her interests to educational technology, becoming a research scientist in the Computer-based Education Research Laboratory until 1993, when the laboratory closed and she retired. As part of the PLATO project within the laboratory, she developed astronomical simulations as well as software for dialup access to the system. After retiring, she and her husband jointly operated a consulting firm.

Her papers are held in the University of Illinois Archives.
