= Fevre Dream =

1982 novel by George R. R. Martin

- First edition cover
- Author: George R. R. Martin
- Cover artist: Barron Storey
- Language: English
- Genre: Horror novel
- Publisher: Poseidon Press
- Publication date: 1982
- Publication place: United States
- Media type: Print (hardcover)
- Pages: 350 pp
- ISBN: 0-671-45577-X
- OCLC: 8475428
- Dewey Decimal: 813/.54 19
- LC Class: PS3563.A7239 F4 1982

Fevre Dream is a 1982 vampire novel written by American author George R. R. Martin. It is set on the antebellum Mississippi River, beginning in 1857, and has been described by critics and Martin himself as "Bram Stoker meets Mark Twain". About writing the novel, Martin said that "It was strongly influenced by the time I spent in Dubuque, Iowa, where river steamboats were once built".

The novel was first published in the U.S. by Poseidon Press in 1982. It was later published as a mass market paperback in 1983 by Pocket Books. Both editions featured cover art by Barron Storey. The novel was also published in 1983 as a UK hardcover by Gollancz and in paperback by Sphere Books. In 2001, Fevre Dream was reprinted by Orion Books as volume 13 of their Fantasy Masterworks series. Bantam Books reprinted it as a paperback in 2004 and 2012.

The novel was nominated in 1983 for both the Locus Award and World Fantasy Award.

== Plot ==
In 1857, Abner Marsh, an unattractive but highly skilled Mississippi River captain, is grappling with a financial crisis when he is contacted by Joshua York, a rich, soft-spoken gentleman. They become unlikely business partners when Joshua promises to finance the construction of a magnificent new riverboat that will be larger, faster and more opulent than any other ever constructed.

When finally completed, the large white, blue and silver paddle steamer is christened Fevre Dream, for Abner's previously failing company, the Fevre River Packet Company. Abner and Joshua co-captain the new vessel, with Abner being solely responsible for her actual command and navigation. Many questions are soon raised by both the crew and passengers about Joshua and his circle of unusual friends, who hardly ever venture out of their cabins during daylight hours. Abner's own suspicions begin to grow when he finds scrapbooks in Joshua's cabin containing newspaper clippings detailing many mysterious, unexplained deaths.

Abner confronts Joshua, who reveals that he and his friends are vampire hunters, using the Fevre Dream as their base of operations to investigate a trail of unusual deaths and disappearances along the river. Eventually he reveals the whole truth: He and his friends are themselves vampires, humanoid beings specialized in and dependent upon hunting humans. Joshua has developed a potion, using ancient alchemy and rudimentary chemistry, which controls the "red thirst" of all vampires. This has led many of his kind to consider him a kind of vampire messiah destined to free them from their bloodlust. Joshua's companions have all submitted to his control as their lord (or "bloodmaster").

The ancient and evil Damon Julian, a rival bloodmaster, soon learns of Joshua's efforts. He boards the Fevre Dream with his own vampire followers and manages to overpower and depose Joshua, becoming the new bloodmaster of all vampires. Abner escapes and sets out to search for the Fevre Dream, which Julian now uses for his own nefarious purposes. After a failed attempt to retake the ship, Joshua convinces Abner to give up as he has already lost.

Abner later serves as an agent of the Underground Railroad and the United States Navy during the Civil War, all the while being haunted by the memory of his lost riverboat, which he retells to others as a ghost story. Years later, in 1870, he receives a surprising letter from Joshua. He travels to New Orleans, where he learns Joshua's mate Cynthia is pregnant, giving Joshua the will to finally depose Julian. Aboard the decaying Fevre Dream, the two vampires eventually square off. With the aid of Abner and the betrayal of Julian's thrall Sour Billy, Joshua finally overpowers Julian and becomes the bloodmaster once again, before Abner kills Julian for good.

The novel closes many decades later by suggesting that all vampires, though still effectively immortal, were eventually freed from their blood addiction by Joshua's potion and Abner's brave efforts on their behalf. They make nighttime pilgrimages to Abner's grave overlooking the river, continuing to honor his heroic contribution to their cause of freedom, Joshua most often of all.

== Graphic novel adaptation ==
In 2010, Avatar Press published a 10-issue graphic novel adaptation by writer Daniel Abraham and artist Rafa Lopez. Mike Wolfer illustrated each cover for the miniseries, which was then collected and published by Avatar in 2011 as a single-volume hardcover.
