= Avner Halperin =

Israeli entrepreneur

- אבנר הלפרין
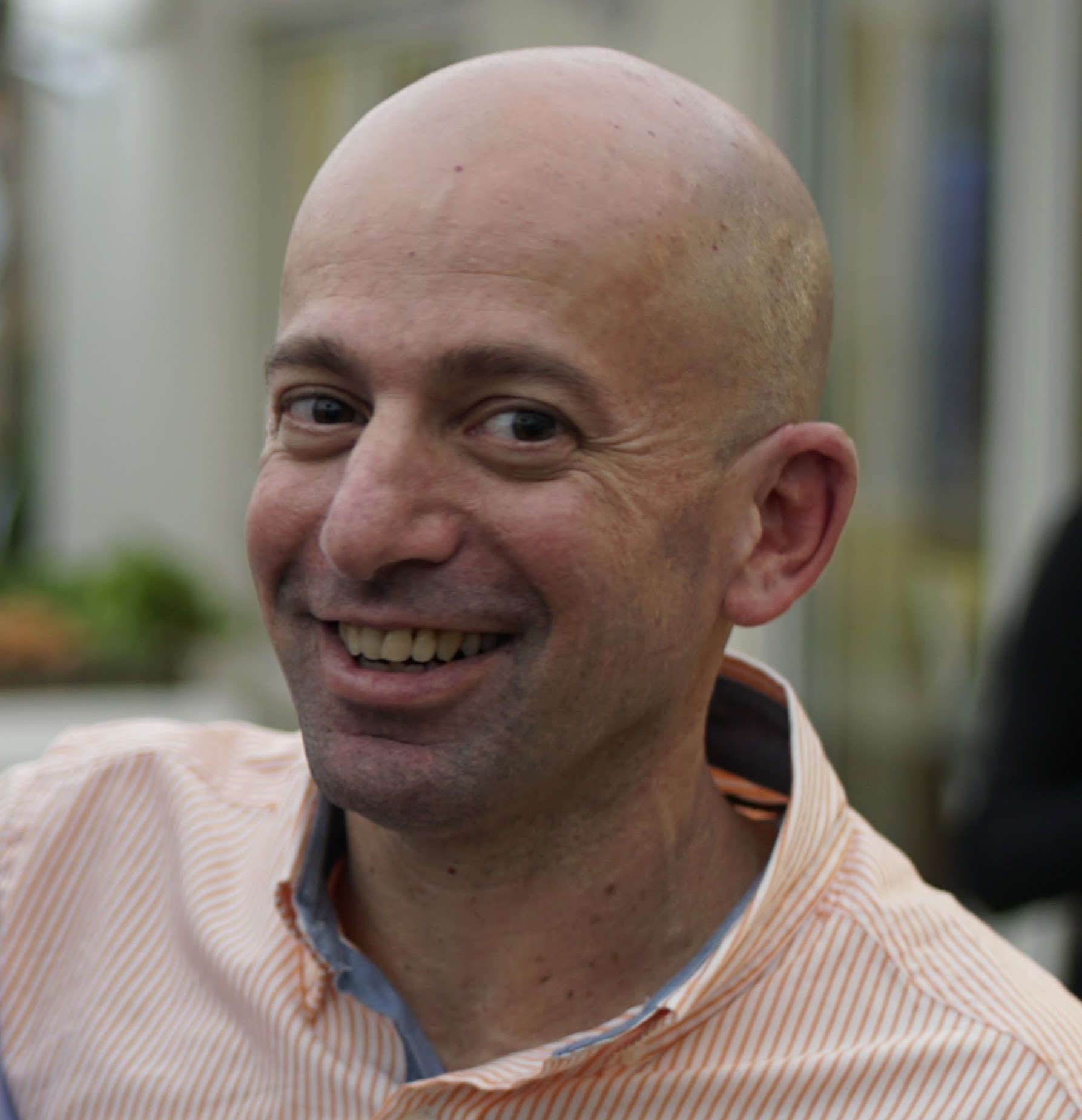
- Born: Avner Halperin; Jerusalem
- Education: The Hebrew University of Jerusalem; Tel Aviv University; Massachusetts Institute of Technology
- Occupation: CEO
- Employer: Sheba Impact
- Board member of: EyeControl - Chairman of the Board

Avner Halperin (Hebrew: אבנר הלפרין) is an Israeli technology executive and entrepreneur. He co-founded EarlySense, a medical technology company developing contact-free patient monitoring systems, and served as its CEO from 2004 to 2019. He later became CEO of Sheba Impact, the commercialization arm of Sheba Medical Center.

== Biography ==
=== Early life and education ===
Halperin was born in Jerusalem. He spent part of his youth in the United States, where he attended high school in Washington, D.C.

He participated in the IDF's Talpiot program and served for six years in a research and development unit of Israeli Military Intelligence.

He earned a B.Sc. in physics from the Hebrew University of Jerusalem, an M.Sc. in physics from Tel Aviv University, and an MBA from the MIT Sloan School of Management. His MIT research examined the employment of American chief executives at Israeli technology companies.

== Career ==
=== Early career ===
Before founding EarlySense, Halperin held management positions at several Israeli technology companies. He worked in business development at Eldat Communications and served as vice president of marketing at Radcom. He also co-founded a mobile antivirus startup with Yossi Vardi.

In 2003, he was vice president for business development at Lenslet, an Israeli company developing optical processing technology.

=== EarlySense ===
In 2004, Halperin co-founded EarlySense with Danny Lange, Guy Shenar and Yossi Gross. The company developed contact-free systems for monitoring patients' vital signs, including heart and respiratory rates.

Halperin served as CEO from the company's establishment in 2004 until April 2019. During his tenure, EarlySense developed monitoring systems for hospitals, expanded into international markets and raised venture capital funding. In April 2019, Matt Johnson succeeded Halperin as CEO, while Halperin remained on the company's board of directors.

In February 2021, after Halperin had stepped down as CEO, EarlySense sold intellectual property rights and exclusive hospital-market rights to its contact-free monitoring technology to Hillrom in a transaction that included $30 million in cash, potential additional payments and the surrender of part of Hillrom's equity in the company.

In 2022, EarlySense entered receivership following financial difficulties and creditor claims. Its remaining assets and home-monitoring operations were subsequently sold to TytoCare. These developments occurred after Halperin's tenure as CEO.

In 2016, he was selected to join a Massachusetts trade delegation to Israel led by Governor Charlie Baker, as part of an initiative to strengthen economic and technological ties.

=== EyeControl and Sheba Impact ===
In August 2020, Halperin was appointed chairman of the board of EyeControl, an Israeli medical technology company developing eye-tracking communication systems for patients who are unable to speak, including ventilated patients.

In 2022, Halperin was appointed CEO of the medical research and commercialization company associated with Sheba Medical Center, later operating under the Sheba Impact name.

In November 2025, Sheba Medical Center announced a collaboration with Nvidia and Mount Sinai Health System to develop artificial intelligence models for genomic research. Halperin discussed the initiative in his capacity as CEO of Sheba Impact.

In a May 2026 interview with CTech, Halperin discussed the use of artificial intelligence and telehealth to expand access to medical care outside hospitals.

Halperin has served as an adjunct lecturer at Tel Aviv University, teaching courses related to big data and artificial intelligence.

In June 2019, he delivered a TEDxAthens talk titled The Missing Link of Medical AI.

=== Academic and research activities ===
Halperin has been affiliated with the Belfer Center for Science and International Affairs at Harvard Kennedy School, where he is a Senior Fellow in the Middle East Initiative.

In 2022, he co-authored Time to Reboot: A Blueprint for the Palestinian Tech Sector, a report examining ways to develop the Palestinian technology industry, with Mahmoud Khweis and Ely Sandler.

He subsequently co-authored research examining healthcare cooperation between Israelis and Palestinians. In March 2025, he was among the authors of a perspective article in The New England Journal of Medicine discussing healthcare initiatives as a potential means of building trust across conflict lines.

== Published works ==
- Comment on Compact short-wavelength free-electron laser, A. Gover and A. Halperin, Physical Review Letters 67(14): 1934 (1991) - Discussion on free-electron laser physics.
- Non-classical Effects in Smith-Purcell Radiation, (M.Sc. thesis, 1993).- Graduate thesis on electron-beam radiation phenomena.
- Electron-beam-induced super-radiant emission from a grating, A. Halperin, A. Gover, and A. Yariv, Physical Review A 50, 3316, October 1994.
- Globally dispersed startups, A. Halperin, MIT, 2001. - Study on the operations of international startup teams.
- Time to Reboot: A Blueprint for the Palestinian Tech Sector, A. Halperin, M. Khweis, E. Sandler, Harvard, 2022
- A blockchain-based computerized network infrastructure for the transparent, immutable calculation and dissemination of quantitative, measurable parameters of academic and medical research publications, Segal, G., Martsiano, Y., Markinzon, A., Mayer, A., Halperin, A., & Zimlichman, E., Digital Health 9, 2023 - Academic article on using blockchain to track research impact metrics.
- A Healthcare Bridge over Troubled Conflicts: A New Model for Building Trust through Joint Healthcare Programs.”, Halperin, A., Abu Fraiha, Y., and Alon N., November 2024, Belfer Center, Harvard Kennedy School. - search report on Israeli-Palestinian collaborative health initiatives.
- Health Care Bridges - Pathways toward Trust in Gaza and Beyond", Abu Fraiha, Y., Ahmed, A., Alon, N. and Halperin, A., May, 2025, New England Journal of Medicine. - Perspective piece on cross-border healthcare as a means to build trust during conflict.
