= Avner Faingulernt =

Israeli film director (born 1961)

- אבנר פיינגולרנט
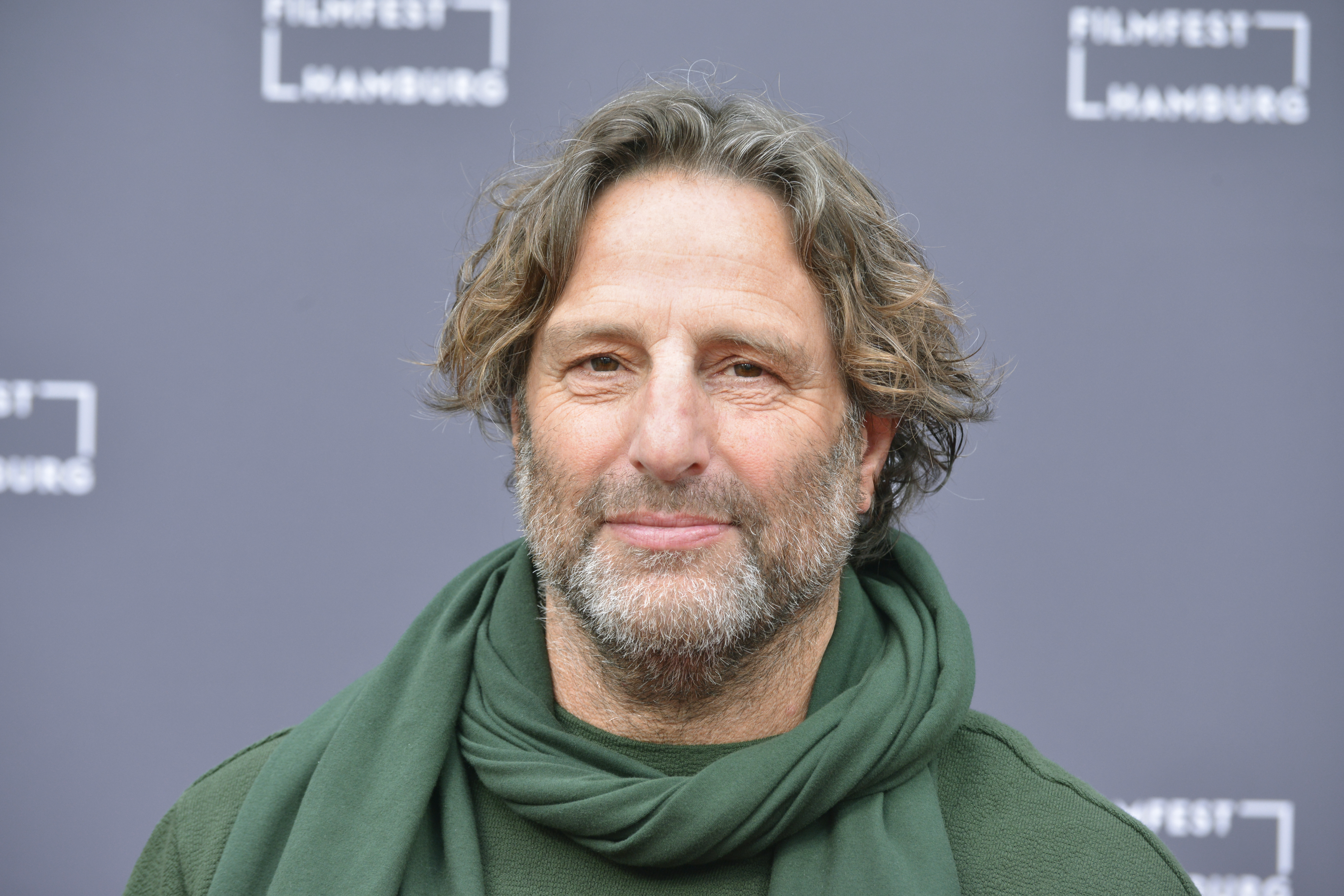
- Born: December 22, 1961 (age 64); Bror Hayil, Israel
- Occupations: Film director and producer, Dean, Faculty of Arts at Kibbutzim College.
- Years active: 1993–present
- Notable work: In the Desert – A Documentary Diptych
- Awards: Best Israeli Documentary Film, Docaviv 2024

Avner Faingulernt (Hebrew: אבנר פיינגולרנט) is an Israeli independent filmmaker. He is professor and the dean of the Faculty of Arts, Kibbutzim College in Tel Aviv. He was chair of the School of Audio & Visual Arts, Sapir Academic College, founder of Cinema South Festival in Sderot, chief editor of the annual "Cinema South Notebooks" and "Cinema South The Curator Book". Faingulernt was also a visiting professor at Columbia University in New York City, the University of Haifa, the Film and TV School of the Academy of Performing Arts in Prague and at Filmakademie Baden Württemberg. He is an educator and a peace activist.

== Life ==
Avner Faingulernt was born in Kibbutz Bror Hayil, as most residents are, to Brazilian immigrants. His parents came from Rio de Janeiro in 1955. He studied in Sha'ar HaNegev Regional Council high school and worked at the agricultural fields.

Like many other Kibbutz youth Faingulernt chose to do a Service Year as a regional coordinator in Sha'ar HaNegev Regional Council and in Sderot. In 1981 he was recruited to the Israeli Defense Forces to the commando squad of Sayeret Matkal special ops unit. After his service he wandered for five years in Israel and all over the world. Among other occupations he worked as a Truck Driver of lighting and camera gear on movie sets and as a fisherman in New York City. According to him, his exposure to film making and especially his job as a lighting best boy filled him with great love towards cinema, and especially for Documentary film making. In 1990 he began his studies of Cinema and Psychology in the Tel Aviv University, where he also directed his first movies.

In 1992, at the time of birth of his first daughter, he returned to the Kibbutz where he was born and raised and dedicated himself to renew the local education system, an important component in the effort to draw back population to Bror Hayil. Afterwards he worked as a director of documentaries items for the show "Ha'She'elah Ha'ba'ah" on Keshet Broadcasting, produced by Yaron London and Nurit Kedar. In 1997, he directed and produced his first documentary film, along with Maya Bar, The First Will Be the Last.

The following stage in his life was to return living and working in the south of Israel creating his unique cinematic language. In 1999 he established an independent studio for documentary and experimental film making in Bror Hayil, and worked then in collaboration with Macabit Abramson and Lev Goltzer on his following films. He was among the founders of the School of Audio & Visual Arts in Sapir Academic College and had been the chair of the school from 2001 to 2018. He initiated and founded the Cinema South Festival in Sderot, the Cinema South Notebooks and the Cinema South The Curator Book, which are journals that offer a stage for articles and discussions regarding films. He completed his PhD studies in London.

Faingulernt is a father of four.

== Academic career ==
Faingulernt has a Bachelor's degree in Film & TV department and Psychology department at Tel Aviv University, 1993. In 1999, he was one of the people who initiated the Film Department with Professor Haim Bresheeth at Sapir Academic College. They opened the film school and Faingulernt became the chair in the end of 2001 after Bresheeth's voluntary exile to the UK.

Between the years 2005 and 2009 he studied for a Master's degree and a Doctor of Philosophy degree in the University of East London in England. The subject of his doctorate was: The Fathers Return in the Modern European Cinematic Odysseys.

In 2011, upon the opening of Master's degree program in the University of Haifa, Faingulernt was recruited as a part of its academic faculty. In 2012 he was a visiting professor at Columbia University in New York City. He also taught a practical workshop of "Desert and Journey", a collaboration between the Film and TV School of the Academy of Performing Arts in Prague and Sapir Academic College's master's degree program.

In 2014, Faingulernt founded, alongside Prof. Judd Ne'eman, the master's degree program of the School of Audio & Visual arts at Sapir Academic College. He was the head of the program until 2018.

In 2017–2018 Faingulernt had been appointed as visiting professor at Filmakademie Baden Württemberg, ludwigsburg.

Since 2019, Faingulernt is the dean of Faculty of Arts at Kibbutzim College in Neve Tzedek, Tel Aviv. He is leading an integration of arts, developing the faculty in community-based and experimental paths.

Faingulernt is a member of Israel Directors' and screenwriters' Union and Documentary Film Makers Forum. He was co-chair of this Forum in 2019–2020.

=== Political activity ===
During the Operation Pillar of Defense in the Gaza Strip there was a consensus among residents of the Negev the supported the wide military operations, and the majority of them even demanded its expansion. Faingulernt was among the few of the area's residents who objected to that consensus. He published his stands against the military operation on different web forums and online media.

== Filmography and exhibitions ==
=== Films ===
Film name and release year	Synopsis and screenings	Roles
It Happened on Our Ground (2024)	Three generations of women grapple with their family's legacy of the Holocaust, its affiliation with the Nazi regime, and their resistance. IT HAPPENED ON OUR GROUND is a sensitive exploration on guilt, memory, and the strength needed to heal. Best Israeli film, Docaviv, Tel Aviv, 2024	Director and cinematographer
In The Desert – A Documentary Diptych (2018)	A project of 5 years of shooting, developed to 2 documentary features: Omar's Dream and Avidan's Dream. Omar's Dream – The story follows Omar, A Palestinian man from Yatta, who re-settles his two wives and children from a comfortable house to his birth village at the desert. Avidan's Dream – The story follows Avidan, a Jewish man from Susya who establishes an illegal farm with messianic purpose on lands that have been confiscated from Palestinians. "The Best Cinematography Award" and "Best Director Award of Fipresci" at the "20th Docaviv", Tel Aviv May 2018; Filmfest Hamburg 2018; Doc Buenos Aires Fest 2018; Viennale – Vienna International Film Festival – 2018; Caligari cinema Ludwigsburg 2018; Millennium Documentary Film Festival Brussels 2019; AFO Olomouc Czech 2019; FAMU Prague 2019; JFF Berlin 2019, Reel Israel Documentary Film Festival 2020 Chelsea Theatre Chapel Hill, USA. Cinematheques of Tel Aviv; Haifa; Jerusalem; Sderot; Ofakim; Hulon; Rosh Pina; Arad; Bet Gavriel; Inbal Cultural center Tel Aviv. Supported by Kan 11, Gesher Fund, Pais (Lottery – Israel).	Co Producer, director, Writer and cinematographer
War Matador (2011)	War Tourism Journal at the border of Gaza during winter 2009 that picture an intimate portrait of Israel in a time of crisis. It explores the phenomenon of "war tourism" which flourished during the war on the Sderot-Gaza border, when people from all over the country swarmed in to observe the shelled Gaza. An observation at the fissures in Israeli society, which ties military strength with Messianic beliefs. War ecstasy and the euphoria of power accompanying are likened to the spectacle of the Corrida – the arena of a cruel struggle for life or death. Screened in Cinema South Film Festival and Jerusalem Film Festival. Supported by Channel 1 Israel, Rabinovich fund and Gesher fund.	Writer, director, producer and cinematographer (alongside Macabit Abramson)
Matador of Love (2006)	Film and dance on the same stage, with actor Alon Abutbul and dancer Anat Shamgar. A journey of a woman in the Land of Israel, as she undergoes an intense relationship with a man whom she desperately longs for, as a metaphor for the vicious and inescapable circle of the relations between the matador and the bull in the Spanish Corrida. Cinema South festival (2006), Khan Theatre in Jerusalem and Suzanne Dellal Center in Tel Aviv (2007).	Producer, director, Script Writer and cinematographer (alongside Macabit Abramson).
Men on the Edge – Fishermen's Diary (2005)	A documentary feature film that was shot over a period of four years. Intimate fishermen's diary of Palestinian refugees and Israeli settlers – tough men from two hostile nations who maintain a delicate and fragile coexistence. Produced in collaboration with the New Fund for Cinema and television, and The Second Authority for Television and Radio . 2005 – the opening film in the fifth Cinema South Festival; commercial screening in the Lev cinema in Tel Aviv; screening in all cinematheques in Israel. Screened in dozens of film festivals all over the world, among them: Visions Du reel – Nyon; Cinemed – Montpellier, Medimed – Barcelona;Cinema dos Mediterraneo – Portugal – 1st award at the Documentary competition;International Prize for Mediterranean Documentary and (with CMCA) Winning of the "RAI SAT CINEMA PREMIUM"; Reportage Sole e Luna DOC FEST-Italy-1st award of the Mediterranean Category; Documenta-Madrid; Human Rights Watch IFF-NY 2006; Human Rights Watch IFF-London 2007; São Paulo international film festival-Brazil; Human Rights Watch IFF -Buenos Aires; États Généraux du Film documentaire-France; International Film Festival El ojo cojo-Spain; Rencontres Internationales du Documentaire de Montréal-Canada; Mediterraneo Video Festiva, September 2006 Italy; UK Jewish Film Festival-London; Israfest – USA.	Producer, director, Script Writer and cinematographer (alongside Macabit Abramson)
Eva (2002)	A full-length documentary film that tells the story of Eva, who has paid a heavy price in her personal life, when, in her Communist past, she had elected to abandon her only daughter, rather than betray the memory of her dead lover. Co-production of "Orna Yarmouth Productions" of Channel 1 and "Gravity Post Production". Screened in "Doc Aviv" in 2002, Cinema South Festival, Channel 1 and in cinematheques and cinemas throughout Europe.	Director, Script Writer and cinematographer (alongside Macabit Abramson).
My Na’an (2001)	Produced within the framework of the "Place" project, this is a Short experimental film that tells of an internal rift in the world of the script writer, of kibbutz Na’an, who was staying with her mother at the same time that Shani, a girl from the same kibbutz, was murdered on the nearby lawn by a man who was obsessively in love with her. Film produced by Amit Goren and Channel 8, with the New Fund for Cinema and Television. Screened in 2001–2002 on Channel 8 in 2002 in "Docaviv", and in various events of art and cinema in Israel and throughout the world, in museums, galleries, and artistic biennales.	Co-Director, Co-Writer and cinematographer (alongside Macabit Abramson)
The First will be the Last (1997)	A full-length documentary film that tells the story of the collective memory of the Maronite Christian community that was evicted from its village of Bir’am in the Galil, during 1948. Produced with the participation of the New Fund for Cinema and Television and the Council for Culture and Art. Screened in 1997 on Channel 2, and in the Jerusalem Film Festival, in the "freedom of the spirit" category.	Producer, director and writer (alongside Maya Bar).
Lev, Hurt and Silence (1995)	First documentary film that deals with the bereavement of families who immigrated from the former Soviet Union over their sons who fell in military service. (Lev here is one of those sons who fell). cable TV Channel 3.	Director and writer.
Come Call the Wind (1994)	A personal documentary film about the rebuilding of a personal and social identity, due to the social crisis in his kibbutz and in the kibbutzim as a whole. Won first prize of the Aliza Shagrir Fund, received grants from the Ministry of Commerce and Industry, the America-Israel Cultural Fund, the Fund for encouraging producers in the kibbutzim, and the Gershoni Fund. Screened in 1995 in Augsburg Festival in Germany, Haifa and Jerusalem Festivals, and on Channel 2.	Producer, director writer and editor.
Edge of a String (1993)	A Short feature film starring Kaipu Cohen (The Summer of Aviah), that recites the story of a girl who comes of age during a single journey on the Tel Aviv to Jerusalem train. Screened in 1994 in the students’ film festival in Munich, the Oberhausen Short films festival, and Haifa Film Festival.	Producer, director and writer.

=== Exhibitions ===
Matador of War cinematic installation (2010) – A cinematic installation at Petach Tikva Museum of Art unfolding a journey along the Gaza-Israel border during Operation Cast Lead, the travelogue sketches an intimate portrait of a vulnerable border area, striving to introduce a profile of Israel in a time of crisis. Parts of the film are projected in three different screens that divide the creation like in a bullfight ring where the audience observes the rising smoke over Gaza. – Producer, director, Script Writer and cinematographer.

The Diary of a Brazilian (2013)) – A one-man-show, on stage and screen together, that tell the journey of searching for identity and the meaning of being a filmmaker, following the death of his father. His Israeli-Zionist-Kibbutz world has become one and he journeys towards the exile from which his parents and grandparents flee. In his journey he wanders between small Jewish towns in West Ukraine, Odesa, Rio de Janeiro and São Paulo in Brazil until Bror Hayil, the Kibbutz in which he was born and raised. A journey that takes place both in real life and in abstract memory, controlled by fantasy and ghost meetings from the past and from the Jewish exile of Eastern Europe and Brazil. During the journey has asks to penetrate deep into the depth of the complicated relationships between his father, his grandfather and his son and their path to his own soul. The show was performed in The Monodrama Festival in the Gerard Behar Center in Jerusalem as part of the Israel Festival, in Cinema South Festival in 2013 and in the Israel Society Convention in Sderot 2013. At the end of the convention a discussion was held between Faingulernt, PhD Amnon Raz-Krakotzkin and the members of the audience.

=== Associate producer ===
- Sisai (2005), Directed by David Gavro.
- Summer Seeds (2006), Directed by Chen Lesker.
- In Freiman's Kitchen (2007), Directed by Hadar Bashan.
- Red Dawn (2007), a series of films made by the school for the arts of sound and screen, edited by Boris Maftzir.
- Gaza, Sderot – Life in Spite of Everything (2008), A website produced by Osnat Trabelsi and Arik Benstein.
- Hula and Natan (2010), Directed by Roby Elmaliach.
