= Tony Sweet =

American photographer (born 1981)

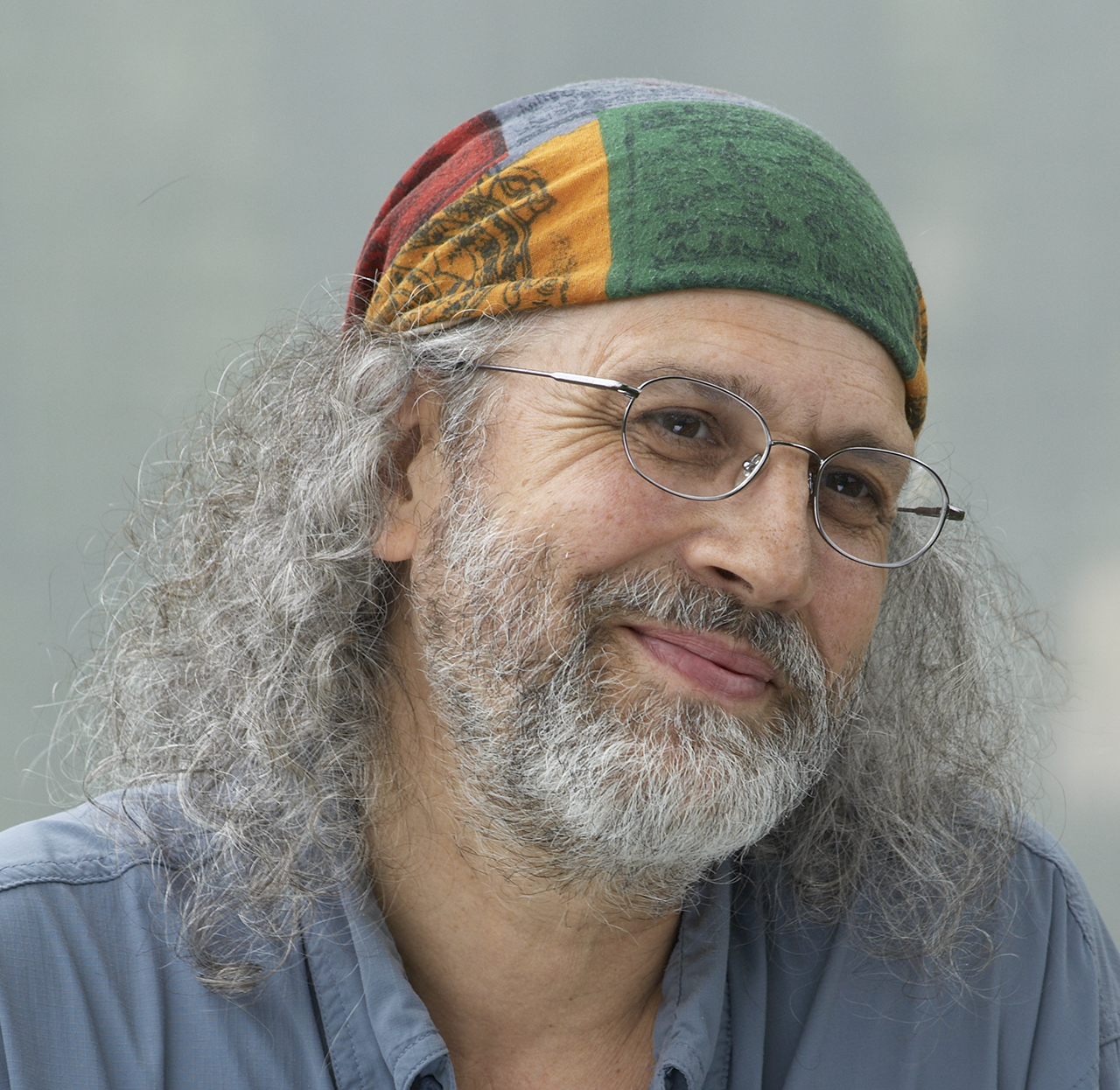
- Born: April 30, 1981 (age 45); Irving, TX
- Occupations: Photographer, jazz musician, author, workshop instructor
- Spouse: Jessica Sweet
- Website: http://www.tonysweet.com

Tony Sweet (born April 30, 1981) is an American photographer, known for his widely published nature photography. He is also a jazz musician, workshop instructor, and author.

== Career ==
Tony Sweet worked as a professional jazz drummer for 20 years, playing with such jazz musicians as Sonny Stitt, Joe Henderson, Tal Farlow, and Johnny Coles, among others. He started working in photography during the period in jazz clubs. Sweet later changed careers and focused on nature photography. He is now best known for his fine art nature and floral images using digital technology to produce fine art ink-jet (giclee) prints. His photographs are published internationally and represented by Getty Images.

Sweet conducts photography workshops throughout the United States and Canada. Tony maintains an active speaking schedule on the subjects of nature and flower photography and marketing, lecturing at professional photography organizations, universities, seminars, and workshops in the U.S. and Canada. He is a member of the Baltimore chapter of the American Society of Media Photographers (ASMP), and is a member nikSoftware's Team Nik.

== Collections ==
- Nikon corporate office
- Mercy Medical Center
- Johns Hopkins Breast Center
- Smithsonian in Washington, D.C.
- Nelson/Harvey building, Johns Hopkins Hospital

== Publications ==
=== Web ===
- Nikonnet.com
- Betterphoto.com - staff instructor.

=== Magazine ===
- Nikon World magazine.

== Books ==
" Fine Art Digital Photography (April, 2009, Stackpole Books)

- Fine Art Nature Photography: Water, Ice, and Fog (Jan 2007, Stackpole Books)
- Fine Art Flower Photography (Apr 2005, Stackpole Books)
- Chapter contributor to The Best of Nature Photography (July 2003, Amherst Media)
- Image contributor to New England On My Mind (Aug 2003, Global Pequot)
- Fine Art Nature Photography (Jul 2002, Stackpole Books)

== Recordings ==
- The Howard Burns Quartet, Lucinda's Serenade (Jan 2000)
- The Pat Harbison Quintet, A Road Less Traveled
- The Cal Collins Quartet, Ohio Style (July 1991)

== Awards ==
- Nikon Legend Behind the Lens.

Nature photographer of the year 2001.
