= Avner Strauss =

Israeli music producer, musician, and poet

Avner Strauss אבנר שטראוס
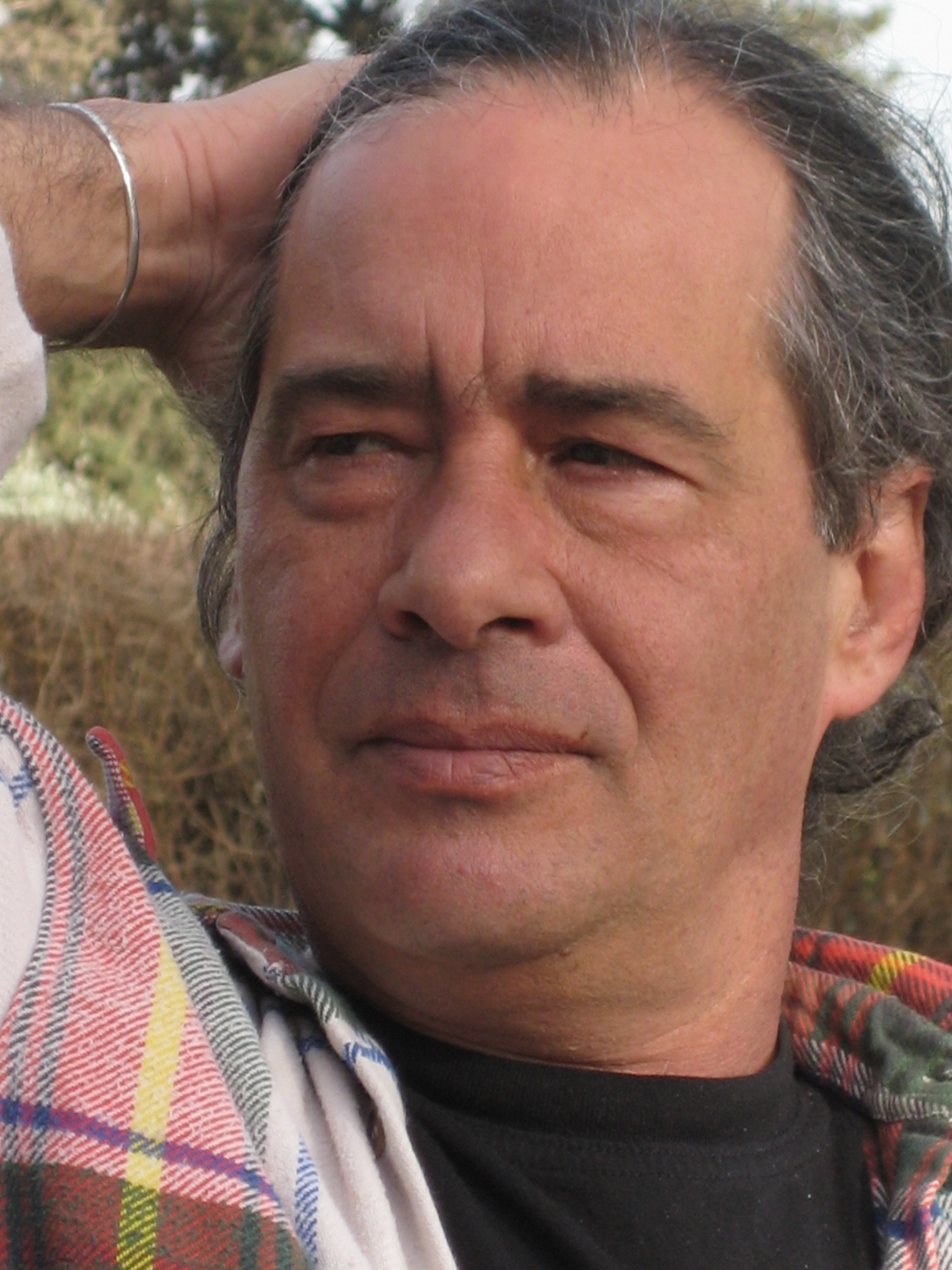
- Avner Strauss, 2009

Background information
- Born: 1954 (age 70–71); Jerusalem, Israel
- Genres: Jazz, Flamenco, Classical, Folk, Bluegrass, Blues
- Occupations: Music producer, musician, guitarist, singer-songwriter, poet
- Instrument: Guitar
- Education: Berklee College of Music, Jerusalem Academy of Music and Dance

Avner Strauss (Hebrew: אבנר שטראוס; born 1954 in Jerusalem, Israel) is an Israeli music producer, musician, guitarist singer/songwriter and poet. He has also written books and music for children.

== Biography ==
Strauss picked up the electric guitar at age 14, and began playing in rock bands in the late 1960s. In 1971 he formed the first Israeli Blues band, and wrote one of the first Israeli Twelve-bar blues; " I got a Telephone, Ain't got no one to call ". Drawn to jazz guitar, Avner went to Boston in 1975 to study at the Berklee College of Music (Composition, graduated in 1978).

Upon returning to Israel in 1978, he began recording and teaching music, and received an appointment as a guitar professor at the Jerusalem Academy of Music and Dance. For few years after he was the advisor of the Israeli guitar company "Yuval" and endorsed their guitars giving concerts (1980–1984) in the frankfurt trade fair "Musikmesse".

Avner Strauss' musical instrument store in Jerusalem ("Effect") in the 1980s was the first Israeli store dedicated solely to guitars.

Although he started out as an Avant Garde guitarist in Jerusalem in the late 1960s, today Strauss plays jazz, flamenco, classical, folk, bluegrass and blues guitar.

Avner has published two illustrated story books for young children ("The Porcupine", "Mr. Frog") and one book of poetry for adults ("Distance and Other Measures").

He has produced three audio CDs of original Hebrew songs, including a live CD of Blues in Hebrew, and a CD and animated DVD of his original children's songs.

Avner also produced an instrumental guitar album ("Courtyard", MCI records 1990) that highlights his many different musical facets and playing styles.

During the years Strauss devoted many years to the research of catalogs and collecting whistles, he published hundreds of articles about the subject and about the History of whistle manufacturers in the 19th century and is considered one of the world's foremost authorities on the subject of collecting whistles, some of his articles and samples of his collection which might be the largest known, can be found on the Whistle Museum.

Avner Strauss is the founder of "Strauss Mifaaley Tarbut" and Sal Tarbut Strauss (Hebrew:"סל תרבות שטראוס") that were involved with education for the arts in the educational system in Israel since 1986, producing music, dance, theatre, cinema, literature and plastic arts shows and activities for schools.

== Discography ==
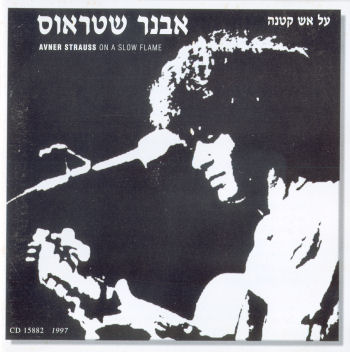
Avner Strauss on L.P. cover of On a Slow Flame

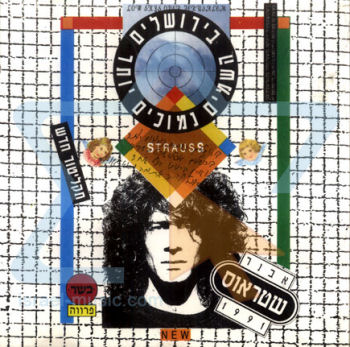
In Jerusalem Heavens are Nearer CD cover

- On A Slow Flame 1987 vinyl album, 11 tracks (Eastronics)
- On A Slow Flame 2nd edition 1995 CD, with 5 Bonus tracks (Hed Artzi)
- Courtyard (Instrumental guitar) 1990 (M.C.I Records)
- In Jerusalem, the Heavens Are Nearer 1990 (Phonokol)
- 1/2% Blues 1995 (Hed Artzi)
- Friends of The Rhino 2004 (CD and DVD) (Strauss Ltd.)
- Equator 2013 (double CD, Fingerstyle guitar-Eastern and Western Hemispheres)
- Blues Haor Haganuz 13 June 2014, Buber's death year date (double CD 23 songs 6 English titles)
- Tel Aviv's Blues 1 December 2016,
- Tesha 9 June 2018

== Poetry ==
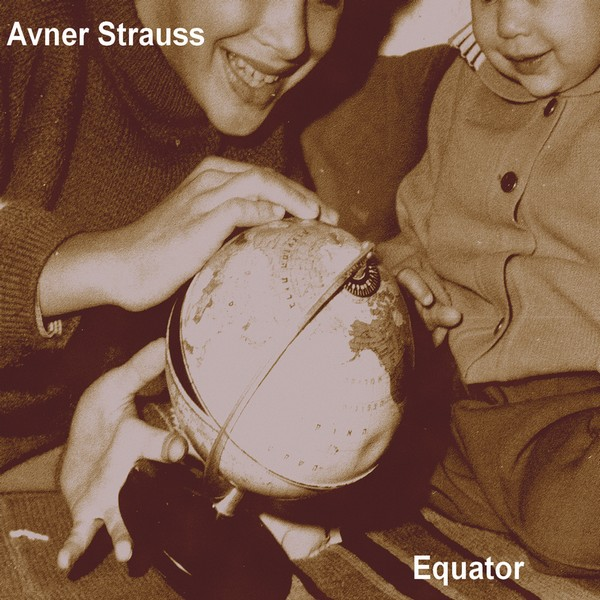
Album Cover Equator Avner Strauss

Avner Strauss poems have been published in various magazines among these are; Mantis 1976, April 2010, February 2011 issues of Moznaim and in the Jewish poetry anthology "Voices Within the Ark" along with poems by his grandfather de:Ludwig Strauss and great grandfather Martin Buber.

- Birds of the Mind
- Chameleons of the Heart.
- Distance and Other Measures. Poems 1976-1992, Hebrew, (Yaron Golan publications).

=== Children ===
- The Hedgehog Who Fell in Love with a Hairbrush 2005
- Mr. Frog 2005 (Strauss Books).

== See also ==
- Sal Tarbut Strauss
- Ludwig Strauss (DE Wikipedia)
- "Touched By the Blues" Stories of the Unsung Heroes of the Blues
- Avner Strauss Biography and Discography In the Mooma Encyclopedya
- The Nation 1989 With Paul Stookey Concert Review 1989

== Notes ==
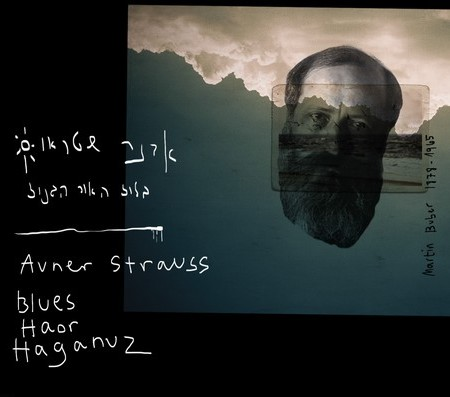
Blues Ha'or Haganuz /Avner Strauss (2014)The double album front cover
