= Avner Magen =

Canadian computer scientist (1968–2010)

- אבנר מגן
- Born: March 30, 1968
- Died: May 29, 2010 (aged 42); Alaska Denali National Park
- Education: Hebrew University of Jerusalem
- Spouse: Ayelet
- Children: Noa, Ofri, and Roy
- Awards: Ontario Early Researcher Award, 2007
- Scientific career
- Fields: Metric embeddings, discrete geometry, computational geometry
- Workplaces: University of Toronto
- Doctoral advisor: Nati Linial

Avner Magen (Hebrew: אבנר מגן; March 30, 1968 – May 29, 2010) was an associate professor of computer science at the University of Toronto whose research focused on the theory of metric embeddings, discrete geometry and computational geometry. He completed his undergraduate and graduate studies at the Hebrew University of Jerusalem, and received his Ph.D. in Computer Science in 2002, under the supervision of Nati Linial. He held a postdoctoral fellowship at NEC Research in Princeton, New Jersey, from 2000 until 2002. He joined the University of Toronto in 2002, first as a postdoctoral fellow, and then as an assistant professor in 2004. He was promoted to associate professor in 2009.

His major contributions include an algorithm for approximating the weight of the Euclidean minimum spanning tree in sublinear time, and finding a tight integrality gap for the vertex cover problem using the Frankl–Rödl graphs. He proved with his coauthors essentially that a huge class of semidefinite programming algorithms for the famous vertex cover problem will not achieve a solution of value less than the value of the optimal solution times a factor of two. With Nati Linial and Michael Saks, he showed how to embed trees into Euclidean metrics with low O(log log n) distortion. And in a later result, he showed how to do JL-style embeddings that preserved not only distances, but also higher order volumes.

He died in an avalanche while climbing in Alaska's Denali National Park on May 29, 2010, along with friend and climbing partner, Andrew Herzenberg.
