= Abner Read =

United States Navy officer (1821–1863)

- Born: April 5, 1821; Urbana, Ohio
- Died: July 7, 1863 (aged 42); Baton Rouge, Louisiana
- Military career
- Allegiance: United States
- Branch: United States Navy
- Service years: 1839–1855, 1858–1863
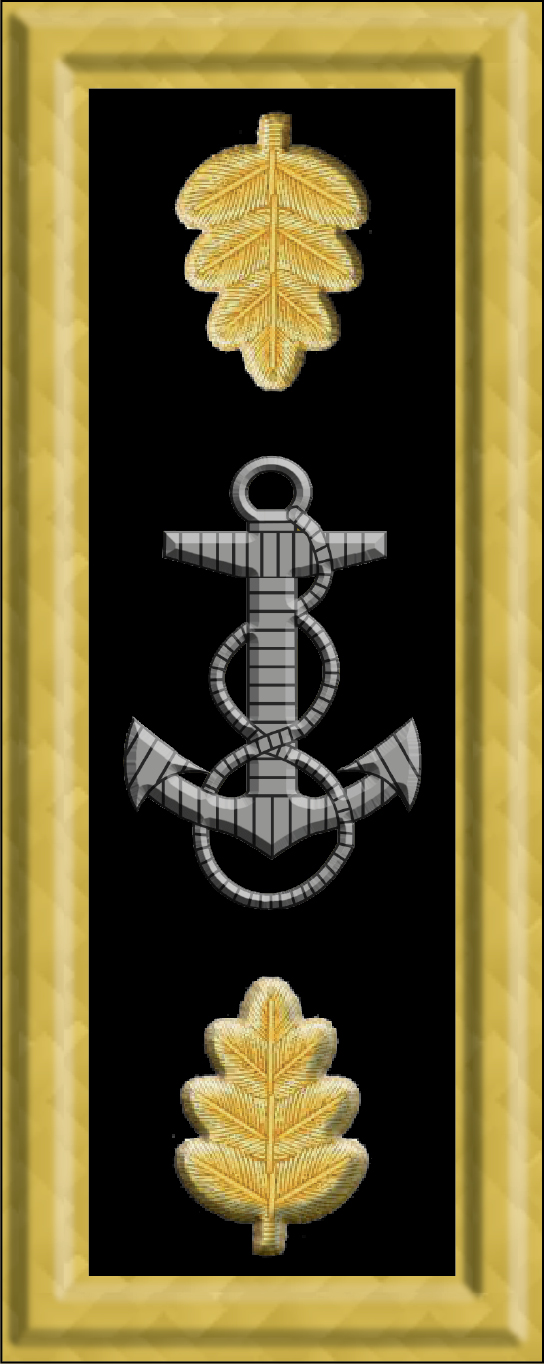
- Rank: Lieutenant commander
- Commands: New London
- Conflicts: Paraguay expedition American Civil War

Abner Read (1821–1863) was an officer of the United States Navy who distinguished himself in the American Civil War. He died of injuries sustained while patrolling the Mississippi River, in command of the New London. At the time of his death, he had attained the rank of lieutenant commander.

== Early life and education ==
Abner Read was born April 5, 1821, in Urbana, Ohio, to Ezra Read and Nancy (Clark) Read. He studied at Ohio University, but left that institution a year before graduating to accept a warrant as a midshipman, effective March 2, 1839. Assigned to Enterprise, he departed New York City in that schooner on March 16, 1840 and proceeded to South American waters where he served first in Enterprise and then in Delaware until the latter sailed for home early in 1844.

Following a year of study at the naval school in Philadelphia, Pennsylvania, Read was promoted to passed midshipman on July 2, 1845. Dolphin then took him to the Atlantic coast of Africa where she operated against slavers through the summer of 1847.

== Sea and shore duty, 1848–1860 ==
Next ordered to Fredonia, he departed New York in that storeship on January 9, 1848, and proceeded to Veracruz where she arrived a week after the signing of the Treaty of Guadalupe Hidalgo. His vessel promptly began issuing supplies to the warships of Commodore Matthew C. Perry's squadron and continued such duty until heading home in June.

Fredonia again left New York on December 11, 1848, bound for California. Gold recently had been discovered there, greatly increasing the importance of and the interest in that newly acquired territory. The ship proceeded south along the Atlantic coast of the Americas, rounded Cape Horn, reached San Francisco Bay on July 31, 1849, and operated on the west coast during the most tempestuous year of the gold rush. She got underway homeward on July 4, 1850, and reached New York on January 7, 1851.

Leave and a tour of duty in Union, the receiving ship at Philadelphia, ensued before Read reported to the side-wheel steamer Saranac in the autumn of 1853. She took him to the Mediterranean, but he left that ship while she was still in European waters and returned to the United States for duty at the Portsmouth Navy Yard.

Meanwhile, Read had been rising in rank. He received his commission as master effective April 12, 1853, and was promoted to lieutenant on February 6, 1854.

Read joined the wardroom of the sloop-of-war Falmouth in the fall of 1854, departed Norfolk, Virginia, in her on December 16, 1854, and cruised through the West Indies unsuccessfully seeking information concerning Albany. That sloop-of-war had departed Aspinwall, Colombia, (now Colón, Panama), on September 29, 1854, and had not been heard from since sailing.

Soon after Falmouth returned to New York in August, Read was shocked to be "dropped from the Navy" on September 13, 1855, in compliance with the recommendation of a board of officers charged with carrying "...into execution an act [of Congress] to promote the efficiency of the Navy." He appealed this decision and was reinstated in rank by a board of inquiry in 1858.

His first ship following his return to duty was Supply, which departed New York in the autumn of 1858 and took him back to South American waters as a part of Commodore Shubrick's expedition to demand an apology and retribution for the death of Water Witch's helmsman. That sailor had been killed by fire from Paraguayan batteries upon his side-wheel steamer as she explored the Paraná River and its tributaries.

Following the resolution of the dispute between the United States and Paraguay through diplomacy backed by a highly visible display of American seapower, Supply operated off the coast of Africa, along the Atlantic coast of the United States, and in the Gulf of Mexico.

== Civil War service ==
Supply arrived at Pensacola, Florida, on December 7, 1860, just a month and a day after Abraham Lincoln was elected President of the United States, precipitating the secession crisis. Just over a week later, Wyandotte entered the navy yard at that port to have her hull scraped. That screw steamer was short of officers due to the resignation of Southerners, so Read was detached from Supply and assigned to the new arrival. In her he helped to prevent Fort Pickens from falling into Confederate hands. However, while doing so, he became ill and was sent home to recuperate.

=== Command of the USS New London ===
Ready for duty again, Read took command of the newly acquired New London when she was commissioned at New York on October 29, 1861. Assigned to the Gulf Squadron, his screw steamer was stationed in Mississippi Sound where she joined screw gunboat R. R. Cuyler in taking the lumber-laden schooner Olive shortly before midnight on November 21, 1861.

In ensuing months, New London took over 30 prizes. Her success was so remarkable that Flag Officer David Farragut felt that he must hold New London in his new command even though she had been assigned to the eastern group when the Navy divided its force in the gulf into two squadrons. "...Lieutenant Read's having made her such a terror to the Confederates in this quarter", he explained, "...that justice to the service required me to keep her...." She was, he maintained, "...absolutely necessary to command the inland passage...."

Read and his ship were ever ready to face up to any challenge which confronted them. When he found "...two rebel steamers ... at Pass Christian..." on March 25, 1862, New London headed straight for CSS Pamlico and CSS Oregon and drove them off to the protection of Southern shore batteries after a two-hour engagement.

Read was promoted to lieutenant commander on July 16, 1862, and on April 18, 1863, he led a boat expedition which landed near the lighthouse at Sabine Pass. It was attacked by a large force of Confederate troops who had been hiding behind the light keeper's house. All but one member of Read's crew were wounded as they raced back to their boat and rowed to New London. Read himself suffered a serious gunshot wound of the eye. Yet, despite his painful injury, he remained on duty until New London returned to New Orleans, Louisiana, late in May for repairs.

While work on New London was still in progress Read was detached from her on June 22 and ordered to relieve Captain Melancton Smith in command of Monongahela. Six days later his new ship headed up the Mississippi River to defend Donaldsonville, Louisiana, which was then being threatened by Southern troops. As its beleaguered riparian fortresses at Vicksburg, Mississippi, and Port Hudson were about to slip from its grasp, the Confederacy was struggling desperately to maintain some hold on the river.

Monongahela spent the ensuing days patrolling the Mississippi between Donaldsonville and New Orleans. On the morning of July 7, 1863, Southern forces opened fire on the ship with artillery and musketry when she was about ten miles below Donaldsonville. A shell smashed through the bulwarks on her port quarter wounding Read in his abdomen and his right knee. He was taken to a hospital at Baton Rouge, Louisiana, where he died on the evening of the next day.

Farragut and the other officers of the squadron were lavish in praise of their fallen comrade. The admiral said that Read had "...perhaps done as much fighting as any man in this war.... The very mention of his name", Farragut maintained, "was a source of terror to the rebels." On another occasion, the Admiral said, "I know nothing of him prejudicial as a man, but I do know that no Navy can boast a better officer and I deem him a great loss both to the Navy and to his country."

== Legacies ==
The destroyers USS Abner Read (DD-526) and USS Abner Read (DD-769) were named for him.
