= Avner Laskin =

Israeli chef, restaurateur, and caterer (born 1969)

Avner Laskin אבנר לסקין
- Born: Avner Laskin; May 11, 1969 (age 56); Nahariya, Israel
- Education: École professionnelle Lenôtre, Le Cordon Bleu
- Culinary career
- Cooking style: Israel
- Current restaurant: Rak Hayom
- Previous restaurant: Bix Tavern

Avner Laskin (Hebrew: אבנר לסקין; born May 11, 1969) is an Israeli chef, restaurateur, and caterer.

== Career ==
Avner's career began in his teens, when he started working at Eidan Bistro in 1987 as a shift manager. He worked there for 6 years, until 1993, assisting the kitchen staff in addition to his managerial responsibilities. Right after his stint in Eidan Bistro he established his own restaurant, Bix Tavern, which specialized in seafood.

In 1998, he went to France to study in Le Cordon Bleu, acquiring a Grand Diplome de cuisine et de patisserie. Afterwards, he studied in École professionnelle Lenôtre and received a Diplome de pain de tradition et de qualite.

In 1999, he opened De Luca, an artisan bakery, in Tel Aviv, which was closed in 2003. It was closed in favor of establishing an international consultant company, ZLA Ltd, which specializes in consultation regarding bakeries.

In 2014, he became general manager and head chef for Bulthaup Culinary Academy which is located in Tel Aviv, whilst simultaneously opening a new restaurant: Rak Hayom (meaning: "Only Today").

== Bibliography ==
Avner has written many culinary books, ranging across a plethora of subjects.

- Hummus: And 65 Other Delicious & Healthy Chickpea Recipes (2006), ISBN 1402733658
- Ice Cream Maker Companion: 100 Easy-to-Make Frozen Desserts of All Kinds (2006), ISBN 1437966756
- Cooking with Chocolate: More than 70 Entrées, Drinks, and Decadent Desserts (2007), ISBN 0517229412
- Artisan Patisserie for the Home Baker (2007), ISBN 140272408X
- The Easy Way to Artisan Breads & Pastries (2007), ISBN 1402747403
- Olives: More than 70 Delicious & Healthy Recipes (2008), ISBN 1402744684
- Nuts: More than 75 Delicious & Healthy Recipes (2008), ISBN 1402744692
- Honey: More than 75 Delicious & Healthy Recipes (2008), ISBN 1402749368
- Tomatoes: More Than 70 Delicious Recipes (2008), ISBN 140275549X
- Celebrating Cobblers and Pies (2010), ISBN 1609000099
- Celebrating Ice Cream and Cake (2010), ISBN 1609000110
- Deliciously Healthy Baking (2012), ISBN 1609004035
