= Memory's Legion =

2022 short story collection by James S. A. Corey

- Author: James S. A. Corey
- Language: English
- Series: The Expanse
- Genre: Science fiction
- Publisher: Orbit Books
- Publication date: March 15, 2022
- Publication place: United States
- Media type: Print, e-book, audiobook
- Pages: 432
- ISBN: 978-0316669191
- Preceded by: Leviathan Falls

Memory's Legion: The Complete Expanse Story Collection is a collection of science fiction short stories and novellas by James S. A. Corey, the pen name of writers Daniel Abraham and Ty Franck. Published by Orbit Books on March 15, 2022, the book collects all eight short fiction works set in The Expanse universe, along with author's notes for each entry.

The collection includes seven previously published works and one new novella, The Sins of Our Fathers, which serves as an epilogue to the main book series.

== Content ==
The collection arranges the stories in the order of their original publication, though they take place at different points in the series' internal chronology. Each story is accompanied by a brief introduction and commentary by the authors.

No.	Title	Original release	Chronological placement in relation to books	Plot synopsis
1	Drive	2012	Roughly 150 years before book 1	It details Solomon Epstein's test flight of the modified fusion drive that would eventually enable humanity to colonize the outer solar system. The narrative juxtaposes his physical helplessness in the cockpit with flashbacks to his life on Mars, chronicling the invention that grants Mars independence from Earth.
2	The Butcher of Anderson Station	2011	Before book 1	Focuses on Fred Johnson during his time as a UN Marine colonel. It depicts the tactical decisions he made during a raid on Anderson Station, a rebellious outpost in the Belt. Johnson initially believes he is suppressing a violent insurrection, only to discover later that the station had attempted to surrender, a fact hidden by his superiors. This betrayal serves as the catalyst for his defection to the Outer Planets Alliance.
3	Gods of Risk	2012	Between book 2 and book 3	Set on Mars, the story follows David Draper, the teenage nephew of Bobbie Draper. While Bobbie attempts to adjust to civilian life after her discharge, David becomes entangled in a dangerous scheme involving the production of illegal "designer drugs." The narrative highlights the declining morale of Martian society as the terraforming dream fades in favor of the new ring worlds.
4	The Churn	2014	Before book 1	Set in a dystopian, overcrowded Baltimore on Earth, this novella explores the early criminal life of Amos Burton (then known as Timmy). It functions as a crime noir, detailing his relationship with a local crime boss named Erich and his surrogate mother figure, Lydia. The story explores the concept of "the churn"—a societal collapse where the rules of civilization vanish and only the most ruthless survive.
5	The Vital Abyss	2015	Between book 3 and book 4	Written as a psychological thriller, this novella is told from the perspective of Dr. Paolo Cortázar, the scientist instrumental in the Protomolecule research. Held prisoner by the OPA on a small station, Cortázar narrates his own history and his obsession with the alien technology. The story delves into the sociopathic detachment required to prioritize scientific discovery over human ethics.
6	Strange Dogs	2017	Between book 6 and book 7	Set on the colony world of Laconia, this story leans into the horror genre. It follows Cara, the young daughter of a Laconian scientist, who discovers the local flora and fauna have strange restorative properties. When her brother dies in an accident, she uses the local "repair drones" (which she calls "strange dogs") to resurrect him, establishing the biological foundation for the Laconian technology used in the final trilogy.
7	Auberon	2019	Between book 7 and book 8	Follows Governor Rittenaur, a Laconian true believer sent to take command of the Auberon colony, one of the most prosperous and corrupt trade hubs in the gate network. Rittenaur attempts to impose fascist order but is outmaneuvered by the local criminal syndicate, led by a hidden figure from the past. The novella illustrates the difficulty of imposing authoritarian control on a complex ecosystem.
8	The Sins of Our Fathers	2022	After book 9	It follows Filip Inaros living in exile under the alias "Jacek" on a primitive colony world after the collapse of the Ring entities. Cut off from the rest of humanity, he is forced to defend his new community from a local apex predator, grappling with the violent skills he inherited from his father. This novella is set after the conclusion of Leviathan Falls to serve as a coda for the story.

=== The Sins of Our Fathers ===
The collection features one original novella, The Sins of Our Fathers, which acts as an epilogue to the entire series. Set after the events of Leviathan Falls, the story follows Filip Inaros—the son of Naomi Nagata and Marco Inaros—who has been living on the primitive colony world Jannah, in a settlement of 436 people cut off from the rest of humanity by the collapse of the Ring network. The narrative centers on the colonists' fight to protect themselves from native creatures that threaten the settlement, and an ensuing power struggle among the settlers.

=== The Last Flight of the Cassandra ===
The collection does not include the short story "The Last Flight of the Cassandra". It takes place during the events of Leviathan Wakes and was released on May 14, 2019. At only five pages long, "The Last Flight of the Cassandra" is the shortest story yet. It was included in The Expanse Role-Playing Game rulebook published by Green Ronin Publishing.

== Reception ==
The collection received positive reviews as a necessary companion to the series. The transition from The Expanse to the authors' new work, The Mercy of Gods, was noted by critics as a shift from the "blue-collar" grittiness of the novellas to new thematic territory.
