= Baltimore in fiction =

Baltimore, a city in the US state of Maryland, has been described by some as "Charm City", by others as "Bodymore, Murderland". F. Scott Fitzgerald, who lived there for five years in the 1930s, wrote of it, "I belong here, where everything is civilized and gay and rotted and polite."

A recent listing of ten best movies set in Baltimore includes works by Baltimore natives such as Anne Tyler, John Waters, and Barry Levinson.

Filmmakers explained their choice of Baltimore as a setting for the 2009 movie He's Just Not That Into You because "We were trying to think of an American urban city that didn't feel like you'd seen it a million times before," and "We wanted something like, not exactly every-small-town U.S.A., but every-urban-young-center U.S.A., so we could all see ourselves in these people."

== Books ==
- Thomas Harris' Dr. Hannibal Lecter operated a psychiatric practice in Baltimore before his confinement.
- Baltimore is the setting for the police procedural books and series based on the work of author and former police reporter David Simon, Homicide: Life on the Street and The Wire. In addition, Simon's reality-based book and TV miniseries on drug dealers, The Corner, is set in Baltimore. Simon is a former reporter for The Baltimore Sun.
- Baltimore native Tom Clancy, a graduate of Loyola Blakefield and Loyola College in Maryland, often includes Baltimore and other parts of Maryland in his action/spy thriller novels and their corresponding feature films.
- Maryland native Nora Roberts also uses Maryland and particularly parts of the Chesapeake Bay as settings for her novels. This includes Baltimore in such novels as Inner Harbor.
- Anne Tyler lived in Baltimore for many years, and many of her books are set there, including The Accidental Tourist, which was also made into a movie.
- Laura Lippman is the author of detective fiction set in Baltimore, most notably the Tess Monaghan novels. Lippman is married to David Simon.
- In Jules Verne's 1865 novel "From the Earth to the Moon", a group of weapons enthusiasts establish the 'Baltimore Gun Club'. The club plans a mission to the moon by building an enormous space gun, the 'Columbiad' cannon. The cannon fires a bullet-like projectile with three astronauts inside.
- The fictional character, Jane Porter, Tarzan's love interest, is a native of Baltimore and the last part of the first Tarzan novel, Tarzan of the Apes, is set there.
- In the 1922 short story "The Curious Case of Benjamin Button", the titular character is born in Baltimore.
- Tim Cockey's mystery novel series, starring the character Hitchcock Sewell, is based in Baltimore.
- Jamie Wasserman's novel Blood and Sunlight is set in nearby Ellicott City with several scenes in Baltimore as well.
- The main character of Nora Sakavic’s All For The Game trilogy, Neil Josten, was born and raised in Baltimore by his mother, Mary Hatford, and his father, Nathan Wesninski, the organized crime leader known as the Butcher of Baltimore.
- Bill LeFurgy sets his Sarah Kennecott and Jack Harden mystery series, consisting of Into the Suffering City and Murder in the Haunted Chamber, in early twentieth century Baltimore.
- Amitabha Bagchi's 2013 novel This Place about the lives of South Asian immigrants is set in the Charles Village/Old Goucher neighborhoods of Baltimore.
- Baltimore is a recurring setting in the Expanse series, serving as the hometown of one of its protagonists, Amos Burton. The Expanse short story, The Churn portrays Burton's upbringing in the criminal underworld of 24th century Baltimore. Burton revisits Baltimore in Nemesis Games where the city is devastated in the aftermath of the Free Navy bombardment of Earth.

== Film ==
- The 1937 film, This Is My Affair is set there.
- The 1944 film Wilson is partially set there.
- The 1946 film The Hoodlum Saint is set there.
- In The Jolson Story, Al Jolson and Steve Martin (William Demarest) stay there.
- In the film The Sum of All Fears, based on the Tom Clancy novel of the same name, Baltimore is devastated by a terrorist nuclear bomb.
- In the 1997 film As Good as It Gets, the character of Melvin Udall (played by Jack Nicholson) gives his "queer neighbor" Simon (played by Greg Kinnear) a lift to Baltimore.
- Barry Levinson has written and directed a number of films set in his home town of Baltimore. Avalon is set in the 1940s, Diner and Liberty Heights are set in the 1950s, and Tin Men is set in 1963.
- A significant portion of the Terry Gilliam science fiction thriller 12 Monkeys takes place in Baltimore.
- John Waters' films are all set in Baltimore, and they have all premiered at the historic Senator Theatre.
- The musical Hairspray (directed by John Waters) and its 2007 film adaptation are set in 1960s Baltimore and feature the song "Good Morning Baltimore".
- Steve Guttenberg appeared in The Bedroom Window in 1987. The exterior view of the bedroom window was done from a parking lot on Eager Street. The interior views showed that the windows overlooked the Mt. Vernon park and monument, nearly 2 blocks away.
- The film Ladder 49, starring John Travolta and Joaquin Phoenix, is set in Baltimore.
- The film Enemy of the State, starring Will Smith and Gene Hackman, had a significant portion set and filmed in Baltimore.
- The film Live Free or Die Hard, starring Bruce Willis was filmed in downtown Baltimore.
- The film ...And Justice for All, starring Al Pacino is set in Baltimore.
- The 1991 film He Said, She Said was filmed and set in Baltimore. Stars Kevin Bacon and Elizabeth Perkins play rival columnists for The Baltimore Sun.
- Meg Ryan's character in Sleepless in Seattle, Annie Reed, works for The Baltimore Sun and some of the scenes are shot at the paper's offices on North Calvert Street.
- XXX: State of the Union. The Capitol Cars that is supposed to be South D.C. is the Abandoned American Brewery from N. Gay St. Other scenes that are reported to be in D.C. area also filmed in Baltimore.
- Both Step Up and its sequel Step Up 2 the Streets are set in Baltimore.
- The 2008 film First Sunday starring Katt Williams, Ice Cube, and Tracy Morgan is filmed and set in the City of Baltimore.
- In the Alfred Hitchcock film Marnie, the title character is from Baltimore and consequently a portion of the film is set in Baltimore.
- In The Invasion (2007) starring Nicole Kidman she escapes Washington D.C. for Baltimore. Both appropriately filmed. But she gets in her car, in Baltimore and it has D.C. license plates.
- In the film-adaption of Silence of the Lambs (1991), Clarice Starling visits Hannibal Lecter in Baltimore.
- The 2009 romantic comedy He's Just Not That Into You was set in Baltimore. Outside scenes were filmed in Baltimore though inside scenes were filmed in Los Angeles. Producers chose Baltimore as their setting as it had not been used as the setting for romantic comedies.
- The 2010 independent movie Putty Hill takes place in Baltimore county. After Cory overdosed himself, people he knew were interviewed to reflect the life they've been through. Some of them lives in his neighborhood Putty Hill, some down in Baltimore city, some moved to other states and traveled all the way back for the funeral.
- The 2012 film LUV was set and filmed in Baltimore, parts of which were filmed in the subway system.
- The 2017 film The Shape of Water is set in Baltimore.

== Television ==
- The series Homicide: Life on the Street was set and filmed in Baltimore.
- The HBO series The Wire is set in Baltimore, with each season focusing on different areas of the city and its society.
- The Seinfeld character Elaine Benes is a native of Baltimore County.
- Several episodes of The X-Files were set in Baltimore.
- The show One on One is set in Baltimore until Breanna moves to Los Angeles for college in season 5 (2005–2006).
- Roc is an American sitcom set in Baltimore.
- In season 7 of CSI: Crime Scene Investigation, Mike Keppler, Grissom's temporary replacement, touches a dead body, to which Catherine Willows says, "Is that how they do it in Baltimore?"
- In season two of House an episode took place in Baltimore
- Hot L Baltimore, a play by Lanford Wilson (and later a short-lived Norman Lear comedy), takes place in a hotel in inner-city Baltimore.
- The American adaptation of Skins is set in Baltimore, though it was filmed in Toronto, Ontario in Canada.
- An episode of NCIS titled "Baltimore" is set as a flashback of a character's days working for the Baltimore City Police Department.
- The NBC series Hannibal is set in Baltimore, although it is filmed in Toronto, Ontario in Canada.
- The Supernatural episode "The Usual Suspects" is set in Baltimore.
- The HBO series We Own This City is set AND filmed in Baltimore, and covers the Gun Trace Task Force, a corrupt element of the Baltimore City Police Department.

== Miscellaneous ==
- The classic Cole Porter musical "Kiss Me, Kate" is set at Baltimore's Ford Theatre and the alleyways behind it.
- Baltimore is referenced several times in the 1993 LucasArts game Day of the Tentacle.
- The action-horror video game The Suffering: Ties That Bind is set in Baltimore.
- Baltimore is featured in an Internet meme based on a vulgar 1990 parody commercial for fictional car dealership Big Bill Hell's Cars, notably including the beginning statement, "Fuck you Baltimore!" This commercial was made as an inside joke for a local advertising awards banquet; a copy left at WBFF-TV (where the ad had been edited) somehow escaped from the station and was eventually uploaded to YouTube and spread around the Internet.
- BBC Radio 4 comedy series Revolting People, starring Andy Hamilton and Jay Tarses is set in colonial Baltimore.
- The Big Finish Productions Doctor Who audio play The Reaping is set in Baltimore.
- The first mission of the game Hitman: Blood Money is set at a fictional abandoned amusement park in Baltimore.

== See also ==
- List of films shot in Baltimore
