= Leviathan Wakes =

2011 science fiction novel by James S. A. Corey

- First edition
- Author: James S. A. Corey
- Cover artist: Daniel Dociu
- Language: English
- Series: The Expanse
- Genre: Science fiction
- Published: June 15, 2011
- Publisher: Orbit Books
- Publication place: United States
- Media type: Print; Audiobook; E-book
- Pages: 577
- Awards: 2012 Hugo Award for Best Novel (Nomination); 2012 Locus Award for Best Science Fiction Novel (Nomination)
- ISBN: 978-0-316-12908-4
- Followed by: Caliban's War

Leviathan Wakes is a science fiction novel by James S. A. Corey, the pen name of American writers Daniel Abraham and Ty Franck. It is the first book in the Expanse series, followed by Caliban's War (2012), Abaddon's Gate (2013) and six other novels. Leviathan Wakes was nominated for the 2012 Hugo Award for Best Novel and the 2012 Locus Award for Best Science Fiction Novel. The novel was adapted for television in 2015 as the first season-and-a-half of The Expanse by Syfy. Five short stories that take place before, during, or after Leviathan Wakes were published between 2011 and 2019.

== Setting ==
Leviathan Wakes is set in a future where humanity has colonized much of the Solar System, facilitated by the invention of the Epstein Drive, a fusion-powered engine capable of producing continuous acceleration. Earth (governed by the United Nations) and the Martian Congressional Republic act as competing superpowers, maintaining an uneasy military alliance in order to exert dual hegemony over the "Belters," the peoples of the Asteroid belt who live on space stations built into the interior of asteroids. Belters carry out the gritty, blue-collar work that provides the system with essential natural resources, and their bodies tend to be thin and elongated owing to their low-gravity environments. Belters are largely marginalized by the rest of the Solar System polity. This class conflict particularly manifests itself in The Outer Planets Alliance (OPA), a network of loosely aligned militant and activist groups, which seeks to combat the Belt's exploitation at the hands of the "Inners", who, in turn, have collectively branded the OPA a terrorist organization.

== Plot summary ==
The ice hauling ship Canterbury is en route from Saturn's rings to Ceres when it encounters a distress signal. Five members of the Canterbury's crew are dispatched in a shuttle to investigate: executive officer James "Jim" Holden, chief engineer Naomi Nagata, pilot Alex Kamal, engineer Amos Burton, and medic Shed Garvey. They discover an abandoned transport vessel called the Scopuli, and find that the distress beacon which lured them is fake and contains Martian technology. An unknown stealth warship arrives and, without warning, destroys the Canterbury with nuclear weaponry. Holden broadcasts a message out to the entire solar system implicating Mars in the destruction of the Canterbury, starting a war between Mars and the Belt.

The survivors of the Canterbury are ordered to rendezvous with the Martian battleship Donnager. The ship's captain denies any knowledge of Martian involvement in the attack on the Canterbury. The Donnager is attacked by ships of the same unknown design and destroyed. While Holden and most of his crew manage to escape on a Martian frigate, Shed is killed. The Canterbury's surviving crew flee to the protection of the OPA's leader, Colonel Fred Johnson. Analysis of a data chip recovered from the Donnager reveals that the mysterious stealth ships were built by Earth. Holden makes another public broadcast sharing this information, hoping to ease the tensions created by his prior implication of Mars. This massively backfires, instead drawing Earth into the war. The Martian frigate Holden's crew escaped on is renamed the Rocinante and on it, Holden is sent to Eros Station to find an OPA operative who sent out a distress signal.

On Ceres Station, detective Joe Miller is illicitly contracted to locate Julie Mao, the daughter of very wealthy Lunar citizens, and send her back to her family against her will. Miller is warned both by his superiors and OPA operatives to stop looking into her disappearance, and is fired when he refuses. Miller discovers that Mao had been involved with the OPA and was aboard the Scopuli when it disappeared. Realizing that Mao's disappearance is connected to the destruction of the Canterbury, he travels to Eros to meet Holden and the crew of the Rocinante.

On Eros, Miller finds Holden's crew and helps them survive an ambush attempt. They locate the body of Julie Mao in a hotel shower infected with a strange, organic growth. On her phone Miller finds logs detailing the progression of her affliction, which seems to be fueled by exposure to energy and radiation, and the coordinates of an asteroid where one of the ships that attacked the Canterbury is docked. Before Miller and the crew of the Rocinante can leave Eros, a station-wide radiation alert is issued and security begins herding people into the numerous radiation shelters. Miller and Holden discover that the radiation alert has been faked by Eros's security contractor, the Earth-based company Protogen, and that people in the shelters have in fact been infected with the same disease as Julie. The infection is spread by Protogen personnel using various methods and subsequent contact with infected individuals. Miller and the crew of the Rocinante narrowly manage to escape the station.

Miller and the crew of the Rocinante follow the coordinates from Julie's phone to find one of the stealth ships abandoned. The team finds a Protogen video explaining that the infection is in fact a molecular biological replication mechanism created by extrasolar aliens with the intent of reaching Earth and hijacking its early biosphere in order to create something for its own mysterious purposes, but which had been captured by Saturn's gravity and stranded. Protogen, which had discovered the organism on Saturn's moon Phoebe and dubbed it the "protomolecule," orchestrated its release on Eros as an experiment in an attempt to discover what it was designed to do given a rich biological source. To this end they had carried out the false flag attack on the Canterbury in order to start a war which would distract the Solar System from the criminal operation on Eros.

With the OPA, Miller and the crew of the Rocinante attack Protogen's secret base in the belt. They capture lead scientist Antony Dresden, who reveals he believes the Protomolecule is humanity's key to the stars, and that by modifying it for their purposes, humanity could become gods. Realizing that Dresden's rationale is likely to be accepted by the powers that be on Earth and Mars, and thus that this horrific research would be allowed to continue, Miller summarily executes Dresden without warning, angering Holden.

Realizing that it is likely that the Protomolecule will be sought after by malicious actors in the future, the OPA and Miller plan to crash a large ship into Eros to propel it into the Sun. Miller leads a team onto the exterior of Eros to rig the station with bombs to ensure no one can capture it while en route. Miller, deciding he has completed everything he wanted in life, stays behind on Eros. Just before the ship impacts the station, however, the trajectory of Eros is suddenly and inexplicably altered.

The Protomolecule proves to have an advanced method of spaceflight which negates both g-force and inertia. Eros, being driven by this inexplicable force, sets off on a collision course with Earth at a speed that no human-made ship can match. Miller, still on Eros, takes one of the bombs into the station in an attempt to destroy its maneuvering capabilities. However, he realizes that Eros is being guided by Julie Mao, whose infected body is in a symbiotic relationship with the protomolecule. Although she is being used by the Protomolecule, she retains enough agency for Miller to convince her to direct Eros away from Earth. The station instead crashes into Venus, presumably killing both Miller and Mao. On Venus's surface, the Protomolecule promptly begins assembling a vast, mysterious structure.

== Reception ==
Kirkus Reviews, Locus Online and other reviewers praised the novel. The book's action sequences were highlighted by SF Signal, and Tor.com wrote that the book had a "satisfying volume completion". Wired.com's GeekDad praised the novel for not containing "overly-complex descriptions of the way governments and corporations work" or "made-up words and cryptic names". Guy Molinari "expressed surprise" that a fictional outer space "cargo ship Guy Molinari" was named in 2012 after the NYC Staten Island "Guy V Molinari" ferry.

One of the main subtexts of the novel has been highlighted by Frederick A. de Armas who discusses in detail the many elements derived from Miguel de Cervantes's Don Quixote. In Chapter 17 of the novel, for example, a crew on the run, led by earther Jim Holden, is given command of a state-of-the-art Martian frigate. After being pursued they are able to use a new transponder to disguise the ship: "Holden punched the comm system on the wall. 'Well, crew, welcome to the gas freighter Rocinante. 'What does the name even mean?' Naomi said after he let go of the comm button. 'It means we need to find some windmills.'". In addition to a fast freighter given the name of Don Quixote's horse, De Armas studies the uses of parody in the novel; the quixotic attitudes that develop in Jim Holden and Joe Miller; the image of Julie Mao as Dulcinea; and the meaning of the windmills or giants. For Robin Seemangal, who relied more on the television series than on the novel, the quixotic windmills have to do with perception. As James Holden comes up on a plain with windmills, these could refer to the UN, Mars or the OPA "and how he perceives them may not be what they are".

The audiobook recording of Leviathan Wakes, narrated by Jefferson Mays and published by Recorded Books, was nominated for the 2012 Audie Award.

== Sequels ==
Leviathan Wakes was followed by the novel Caliban's War in 2012 and Abaddon's Gate in 2013. It was announced in 2012 that Orbit Books had ordered a further three books in the Expanse series, in addition to five novellas set in the same universe. The first of these sequels was announced in September 2013 as Cibola Burn and was released on June 17, 2014, in hardcover, Kindle, and on Audible in the US. Later additions to the series include Nemesis Games, Babylon's Ashes, Persepolis Rising, Tiamat's Wrath, and finally Leviathan Falls.

== Shorter fiction ==
=== "Drive" ===
"Drive" is a 7-page short story set before Leviathan Wakes. Released on November 27, 2012, "Drive" was originally published as part of the sci-fi anthology Edge of Infinity edited by Jonathan Strahan. It was later posted on the Syfy website. The story covers the first test of the "Epstein Drive," a modified fusion drive that allows spaceships to travel faster and further than previous propulsion methods, thus making stellar exploration practical and possible. Solomon Epstein, the inventor, installs the drive to his personal ship to test the device; it works, but Epstein is immediately debilitated by the g-force and he is unable to counteract the ship's acceleration. Realizing any rescue vehicle would be unable to catch up due to the incredible fuel requirements of doing so, Epstein accepts his fate and reflects that he has opened a new chapter in space travel as he blacks out.

=== The Churn ===
The Churn is set before Leviathan Wakes. It was published on April 29, 2014, and consisted of 75 pages, making it the longest of the non-novel stories published by James S. A. Corey, tied with "Gods of Risk".

=== "The Butcher of Anderson Station" ===
"The Butcher of Anderson Station" is set before Leviathan Wakes. It was published on October 17, 2011, and consisted of 40 pages.

=== "The Last Flight of the Cassandra" ===
"The Last Flight of the Cassandra" takes place during the events of Leviathan Wakes and was released on May 14, 2019. At only five pages long, "The Last Flight of the Cassandra" is the shortest story yet. It was also included in The Expanse Role-Playing Game rulebook published by Green Ronin Publishing.

=== "The Vital Abyss" ===
"The Vital Abyss" spans a time period from before Leviathan Wakes to well into the fourth novel in the series, Cibola Burn. Published on October 15, 2015, it is the second-longest novella by James S. A. Corey at 74 pages long.
