= Persepolis Rising =

2016 science fiction novel by James S. A. Corey

- First edition
- Author: James S. A. Corey
- Cover artist: Daniel Dociu
- Language: English
- Series: The Expanse
- Genre: Science fiction
- Published: December 5, 2017
- Publisher: Orbit Books
- Publication place: United States
- Media type: Print; Audiobook ebook
- Pages: 560
- ISBN: 978-0-316-33283-5
- Preceded by: Babylon's Ashes
- Followed by: Tiamat's Wrath

Persepolis Rising is a science fiction novel by James S. A. Corey, the pen name of Daniel Abraham and Ty Franck, and the seventh book in their series The Expanse. The title of the novel was announced in September 2016 and the cover was revealed on December 12, 2016.

== Plot summary ==
Twenty-eight years have passed since the events of Babylon's Ashes, and no one has heard from Admiral Winston Duarte and his rogue fleet in the decades since they broke away from the Martian Congressional Republic Navy and journeyed through the Laconia gate. They have spent their time in the Laconia system building an advanced fleet using leftover technology from the Protomolecule's creators, along with the sample of the Protomolecule they stole from Fred Johnson on Tycho. Duarte uses the Protomolecule to massively extend his life, planning to become the immortal emperor of the 1,300 worlds joined by the gates.

Meanwhile, back in the Solar System, Earth is back on its feet after the attack that crippled the planet. The crew of the aging gunship Rocinante (Holden, Naomi, Alex, Amos, Clarissa, and Bobbie) are still together, working contracts for the Transport Union, who control trade through the Slow Zone and the worlds the gates lead to. After receiving a morally dubious order to blockade trade to an entire system from union president Camina Drummer, upon returning to Medina, Holden and Naomi decide to retire and hand over the Rocinante's captaincy to Bobbie.

The Laconians send out a message announcing the end of their self-imposed exile and send an enormous, incredibly advanced battleship, Heart of the Tempest, through their gate to capture Medina station. The battleship obliterates the railgun emplacements installed in the Slow Zone using a new magnetic weapon that can disintegrate matter at the atomic level, and easily takes control of the station.

A Laconian navy commander, Santiago Singh, is made governor of Medina. At first, Singh tries to govern Medina station fairly, but after a failed assassination attempt he is shaken and becomes paranoid, having never been in combat before. His orders become increasingly ruthless, including creating public prisons, strictly limiting communications, and enforcing heavy curfews and censorship. Singh also fires his head of Security, drawing rebukes from his superiors. The crew of the Rocinante become part of a resistance movement on Medina station, which is headed by Saba (Drummer's husband).

The Tempest leaves Medina to conquer the Solar System ahead of schedule, leaving a single small gunship, the Gathering Storm, to defend the station while another battleship, the Typhoon, is dispatched from Laconia. The Rocinante crew help the resistance with a plan to steal vital intelligence about the Laconian military and their advanced weapons. They steal Laconian encryption codes, disguising their intentions by using a carefully placed bomb as a distraction, hoping this will fool the Laconians into believing they were committing a terrorist attack and not a theft. The plan goes awry and Holden has to manually set off station alarms to maintain the distraction, which results in his capture. His intervention succeeds however and the Laconians do not realize their encryption codes have been stolen. This allows the remaining crew of the Rocinante to decrypt the station's security data, and begin to form a plan to free Holden and escape.

In the Solar System, the Tempest decimates the combined fleets of Earth, Mars, and the Transport Union. However, when the Tempest uses its magnetic weapon, everyone in the Solar System blacks out for several minutes. The Tempest crew then discover a strange artifact that has appeared on board their ship, a sphere of the same floating matter that had destroyed the alien technology on Ilus decades before. On Medina station, Singh interrogates Holden, one of the only witnesses to the artifact on Ilus, and learns that the artifact on board the Tempest came from the same race that killed the Protomolecule builders. Realizing that Holden has a unique insight into this mysterious race, Singh has him shipped to Laconia.

Back in the Solar System, as the Tempest crosses the asteroid belt, the entire combined fleet mounts a final stand against it, using atomic weapons that would destroy any other ship. The Tempest somehow survives the attack. Although it does not use its magnetic weapon again, it is still able to decimate the combined fleet. After realizing that the ship cannot be stopped, Drummer surrenders, and the governments of Earth and Mars quickly follow, letting Laconia take control of the Solar System.

On Medina, the resistance decodes the intelligence they stole and formulates a plan to evacuate as many people from the station as possible, where they will scatter through the ring gates to other colonies before the Typhoon can arrive. The plan is for Saba to release all prisoners on the station to sow chaos while the resistance takes control of the docks. Meanwhile Alex in the Rocinante will distract the Gathering Storm while a boarding team led by Bobbie and Amos take control of the Laconian gunship, allowing the other ships docked at the station to escape. Clarissa and Naomi will disable the station's sensors so that the Laconians cannot tell which gates the evacuating ships have gone through.

Although the first part of the plan works, Naomi and Clarissa are betrayed by a double agent in the resistance, informing Singh who sets up an ambush. Clarissa uses her blackmarket adrenal gland mods to kill the ambush team of Laconian marines, but dies as a result. Bobbie leads the assault on the Gathering Storm and takes control of the ship. She is joined by the Rocinante and others and they escape the Slow Zone and go into hiding on a colony called Freehold. After the massive security failure, Singh instructs his security chief to cull the remaining population on Medina. Instead, the chief informs Singh that he has been instructed by Duarte to kill him for his failure to stamp out the resistance, and shoots him.

In the epilogue, Holden arrives as a prisoner on Laconia. He meets Duarte, and attempts to warn him of the danger the protomolecule-destroying artifact on the Tempest poses. Duarte ignores his concerns, reveals he plans to use the Protomolecule as a weapon to rule all of humanity, and asks Holden to join him.

== Characters ==
- James Holden, aging Captain of the Rocinante, after over 30 years of working the Rocinante, Holden looks to the next chapter of his life, retirement. When the Laconians return through the gate, Holden is drawn back in to the fray. While his companions all escape to lead the resistance against Duarte, he is taken back to Laconia as a captive.
- Bobbie Draper, former Martian Marine and now working on the Rocinante. When Holden retires, Bobbie takes up the mantle of Captain of the Rocinante.
- Camina Drummer, former head of security at Tycho Station, now the president of the Transport Union. The Transport Union's control of Ring station, and the 1,300 worlds it connects to, makes Drummer one of the most powerful people in all of humanity.
- Santiago Jilie Singh, a Captain in the Laconian Navy, recently promoted to command The Gathering Storm. After the Laconians take Medina Station, Singh is appointed as the governor of the station.
- Naomi Nagata, one of the best engineers in the solar system and XO of the Rocinante, she is looking forward to a quiet retirement alongside Holden, until the Laconians return and Naomi gets pulled in to the resistance with the rest of the crew of the Rocinante.
- Alex Kamal, pilot of the Rocinante, after another failed marriage, and a son who is in university, Alex is still at the helm of the Rocinante, with no plans of leaving.
- Amos Burton, mechanic on the Rocinante, still very close friends with Clarissa, Amos has become her caretaker as her health is declining.
- Clarissa Melpomene Mao, daughter of the disgraced Jules-Pierre Mao and former prisoner on Earth, now a mechanic on the Rocinante alongside Amos. Clarissa's health is deteriorating due to the body modification implants she got over thirty years ago, during her quest to destroy Holden and restore her father's good name. During the final assault to steal the Storm she activates her mods one final time and is killed by a combination of the chemicals being released and injuries received in the fighting.
- Paolo Cortázar, a former member of Protogen's nanoinformatics research division who was a prisoner of the OPA after the raid on Thoth Station. He was released by rogue members of the OPA, and has been working with the rogue Martian fleet under Admiral Duarte ever since. He is the lead researcher on Laconia and is working on making Duarte immortal using protomolecule technology.
- Winston Duarte, a former Commander in the Martian Congressional Republic Navy, until he and a splinter group broke away from Mars and went through the ring gate to the planet Laconia, where he was awarded the rank of Admiral in the newborn Laconian Navy. Duarte learned of Laconia and the vast amount of protomolecule technology that was left behind by the creators through his position at the MCRN, and felt that it needed to be acquired and understood, in the event that the race that destroyed the protomolecule builders returned. He sees himself as a Philosopher King who will lead humanity to victory over whatever destroyed the Protomolecule builders. To achieve this and avoid problems with succession he has begun treatments to make himself immortal.

== Reception ==
A review on Elitist Book Reviews praised the characterization in the novel, saying "Characterization in this book was on point. In fact, it’s likely the best they’ve done in the series. There were so many moments that had me holding my breath, or whispering “no…”, and seriously tearing up." Andrew Liptak of The Verge was slightly critical of the book, however, saying "[Persepolis Rising] does fall short in some places. The Laconians feel too much like a stereotypical evil empire, complete with super weapons and armored foot soldiers. Singh himself feels particularly naïve — it should be obvious why governments don’t want to accept Laconian rule. One would think a powerful military power would have a more realistic understanding of invasion forces and dealing with insurgencies. Even if the series is reaching for new stakes in its final arc, it’s less interesting than the nuanced politics of past books."

Niall Alexander of Tor.com praised the dark tones and themes of the novel, saying "Though the seventh part of [The Expanse] opens on an unusually hopeful note, with humanity writ large finally united and our ever-hopeful heroes planning happy retirements, Persepolis Rising is ultimately among the darkest chapters of this insatiable saga. It takes a little longer than I’d like to get going, but when it does, Persepolis Rising proves as pulse-pounding and poignant as any of its powerful predecessors, and given how near the end is from here, I don’t expect there to be another dull moment before the whole story’s over."

== Short story ==
=== "Auberon" ===
"Auberon"
- Short story by James S. A. Corey
- Country: United States
- Language: English
- Genres: Science fiction Space opera

Publication
- Media type: e-Book
- Publication date: November 12, 2019

Chronology
- Series: The Expanse
Strange Dogs	—

"Auberon" is a short story published by James S. A Corey set between Persepolis Rising and its sequel Tiamat's Wrath on November 12, 2019. It consists of 63 pages.
