= Leviathan Falls =

2021 novel by James S. A. Corey

- First edition
- Author: James S. A. Corey
- Cover artist: Daniel Dociu
- Language: English
- Series: The Expanse
- Genre: Science fiction
- Published: November 30, 2021
- Publisher: Orbit Books
- Publication place: United States
- Media type: Print; Audiobook; E-book
- Pages: 518
- ISBN: 978-0-316-33291-0
- OCLC: 1286627410
- Preceded by: Tiamat's Wrath
- Followed by: Memory's Legion

Leviathan Falls is a science fiction novel by James S. A. Corey, the pen name of Daniel Abraham and Ty Franck, and the ninth and final book of the series The Expanse. The title and cover art were announced by the authors at a virtual fan announcement on September 16, 2020 and the book was released November 30, 2021. The title echoes the title of the initial book in the series, Leviathan Wakes. The book won the 2022 Dragon Award for Best Science Fiction Novel.

== Plot summary ==
Following the events of Tiamat's Wrath, the mysterious "dark gods" or "ring entities" have been experimenting with methods to kill humans in various ways, including adjusting the principles of physics in some systems, and launching their loss-of-consciousness attacks. Winston Duarte suddenly awakens from his semi-catatonic state with newfound knowledge about the Ring-Builders, and new abilities, including being able to project a vision of himself into other people's minds. He projects himself into the mind of Admiral Trejo, who is currently reconquering the Sol system for the Laconian Empire. Duarte expresses gratitude for Trejo's efforts in preserving the Empire and admits they had been thinking too small in their empire-building vision. Duarte then vanishes, prompting Trejo to order a return to Laconia. Upon arrival, Duarte has already disappeared from the state building, and Colonel Aliana Tanaka is tasked to locate him with the highest possible level of security clearance.

Tanaka's search leads her to the cave Amos Burton once inhabited, where she deduces that Duarte left Laconia in a small alien ship. She decides to use Teresa Duarte, who had fled Laconia with the crew of the Rocinante in Tiamat's Wrath, as bait to lure Winston. She begins her search for Teresa by investigating Duarte's known relatives in various ring systems. Meanwhile, Elvi and her team, along with the protomolecule-resurrected children Xan and Cara, are investigating the Adro Diamond, a Ring-Builder record keeping device. The team uses the protomolecule to activate the diamond, which then communicates with Cara through her enhancements to show her the history of the Ring-Builder civilization. The Ring-Builders were sea-slug like creatures that evolved under the ice of a Europa-like water world, and eventually evolved beyond their physical bodies and into a hive mind, able to communicate faster than the speed of light. Some of Cara's experiences bleed into Amos, who has been similarly altered.

Meanwhile, the Rocinante crew (Jim, Naomi, Alex, Amos, and Teresa) are avoiding Laconian ships while Naomi manages the underground resistance. They transit to the colony world of New Egypt to take Teresa to a boarding school near her relatives, but they find Tanaka and a team of Laconian marines already waiting for them. After a firefight, they escape to the Rocinante and flee to the Freehold system, the location of the underground's base, Draper Station. However, Laconian forces are already present when they arrive, and suspicious of the disguised ship, alert Tanaka. As the Rocinante covertly resupplies at Draper Station, Tanaka arrives in the system and delivers a message from Trejo to Naomi. The message offers an armistice and alliance between the Laconian Empire and the underground, implementing Naomi's gate travel protocols, and the withdrawal of Laconian forces from Freehold. In return, he simply wants them to return Teresa. The crew deems Trejo's demands unreasonable, but resistance member Jillian Houston takes matters into her own hands, locking the Rocinante crew in their quarters and accepting the Laconian offer. Tanaka, however, has no intention of honoring the deal and kills Jillian's guards before searching Draper Station for Teresa.

Jillian releases the Rocinante crew, who launch and escape through the ring gate, while the Gathering Storm sacrifices itself to cover their retreat. A particularly devastating dark god attack eradicates all but the most basic life forms in one system, sparking mass fear that the dark gods have figured out how to eradicate humanity as they had the Ring-Builders. Amos convinces the crew to head to the Adro system to meet Elvi and aid in the investigation of the diamond. Tanaka, losing the Rocinante's trail, mistakenly follows another ship to the Bara Gaon system. During her search, a large colony ship enters the ring space from the Sol system too soon after another transit. The ship begins to vanish, but it is saved by an unknown force. This event causes the rings to glow brightly and triggers those in the slow zone and aboard the ship to begin to experience shared memories. After this, the attacks by the dark gods cease in all systems.

When the Rocinante finally reaches the Adro system, they decide to perform a dual dive into the alien device with Cara and Amos. During this process, the vision of Duarte appears to Elvi and Holden, proposing that humanity must join him in creating a hive mind to counter the ring entities' attacks, just as the Ring-Builders had. The mind-melding and shared memories experienced by those in the slow zone begin to spread like a virus throughout humanity, and the crew of the Rocinante realizes that Duarte is starting his plan of gradually converting humanity into a hive mind. Following the dual dive, Amos convinces Elvi to cease the dives with Cara for ethical reasons. Meanwhile, Tanaka, troubled by the shared memory experience, seeks psychiatric help and receives medication to mitigate the issue. She learns that Laconian scientists believe they have found Duarte's alien ship on the surface of the Ring Station, and both the Rocinante crew and Tanaka decide to head there. Naomi sends Trejo a message accepting his earlier offer and providing the data from the dual dive experiment, while simultaneously sharing the information with the underground resistance and urging them to send ships to the Ring Space. Trejo orders Tanaka to either retrieve Duarte or assume control. As more ships arrive into the Ring Space, some lose contact as Duarte gains control of their crews through his burgeoning hive mind.

Upon arrival in the slow zone, Tanaka, Teresa, and Amos perform a dive to attempt to open the Ring Station that angers Duarte. Seeing no other options, Jim injects himself with a live sample of the protomolecule, dooming himself to its slow death. For the first time in more than three decades, the protomolecule induced vision of Joe Miller appears to Holden, just as he had hoped it would. Miller helps open the Ring Station, and Holden, Tanaka, and Teresa enter to find and stop Duarte. Meanwhile, a massive space battle unfolds in the slow zone, as the joint underground and Laconian fleets desperately try to buy Holden and Tanaka time despite heavy fire from Duarte's hive mind controlled ships. While they journey through the station, Miller explains that the Ring-Builders had discovered that the universe existed alongside a much older parallel reality, and built the slow zone within this alternate realm, using the immense energy of the other dimension to power the gates. However, stealing energy from this dimension to allow for the travel of ships through the rings hurt the alternate dimension's mysterious inhabitants, the dark gods, leading them to attack the Ring-Builders, and now humanity. Reaching the center of the ring station, the team finds Duarte connected to the station, creating his hive mind and stalling the dark gods attacks.

Teresa's attempts to convince Duarte to stop his hive mind fail, and Tanaka kills him, simultaneously ending the hive mind and unleashing the dark gods on humanity. In the ensuing struggle, Tanaka is also killed. Jim realizes what he must do in order to save humanity. He connects himself to the station, taking Duarte's place, and holds the dark gods at bay while Teresa escapes the Ring Station and orders the remaining ships to exit the slow zone. After an emotional goodbye, the crew of the Rocinante splits for the final time after decades of flying together. Alex takes the Rocinante to Nieuwestadt system to live with his son and grandchild, while Amos, Naomi, and Teresa travel with Elvi back to Sol. Once the slow zone is empty, Jim destroys the Ring Station, sacrificing himself, but severing the dark gods' connection to the human universe and causing the ring gates to collapse. All of the 1,300 colony systems, now unable to communicate with each other, are left to fend for themselves.

In an epilogue set 1,000 years later, humans have developed their own form of faster-than-light travel. A team from The Thirty Worlds, a federation of colonies, journeys to Earth, where they are greeted by Amos Burton.
