= Babylon's Ashes =

2016 science fiction novel by James S. A. Corey

- First edition
- Author: James S. A. Corey
- Cover artist: Daniel Dociu
- Language: English
- Series: The Expanse
- Genre: Science fiction
- Published: December 6, 2016
- Publisher: Orbit Books
- Publication place: United States
- Media type: Print; Audiobook; E-book
- Pages: 544
- ISBN: 978-0-316-33474-7
- Preceded by: Nemesis Games
- Followed by: Persepolis Rising

Babylon's Ashes is a science fiction novel by James S. A. Corey, the pen name of Daniel Abraham and Ty Franck, and the sixth book in their The Expanse series. The title of the novel was announced in early July 2015, and the cover and brief synopsis were revealed on September 14, 2015. It won the 2017 Dragon Award for Best Science Fiction Novel.

This is the last book in the series to be set in the period that began with Leviathan Wakes, as the remaining sequels take place decades later.

The title refers to the fall of the empire of Babylon, mirroring the fall of an empire that takes place in the book.

== Plot summary ==
Three months have passed since the Free Navy attacked the Solar System. The Navy consolidates power in the Belt, steals resources from colony ships heading for the Ring, cuts off contact between Medina Station and the colonies, and continues launching rocks at Earth. The Free Navy installs rail guns around the alien station near Medina Station, which has been dormant since the events of Abaddon's Gate, to prevent any enemy ships from passing through the area. Meanwhile, Winston Duarte's rogue Martian faction takes residence in the Laconia system through the gates and works for some unknown purpose. The reason for the disappearance of certain ships passing through the Ring Gates remains unknown.

Marco Inaros calls a meeting of his inner circle, including Michio Pa, Anderson Dawes, and others, and lays out his plan for a future for the solar system in which humanity exists completely independently of Earth. On Luna, James Holden has a meeting with acting UN secretary Chrisjen Avasarala, who informs him that Earth has identified the Azure Dragon, the Free Navy ship that coordinates the asteroids that have decimated Earth. Holden and his crew (including Clarissa Mao, whom Amos had rescued from Earth during the attack) are sent on a mission on the Rocinante to disable the Azure Dragon. Bobbie Draper is sent along as mission commander. They succeed, and they bring the crew of Azure Dragon as prisoners back to Luna.

With the immediate threat of more rock strikes averted, Avasarala plans to launch a major offensive to take back Ceres from the Free Navy. However, Marco Inaros strategically evacuates the station after stripping it of its resources, leaving the arriving Earth and Martian fleets responsible for the survival of millions of stranded citizens. Fed up with his tactics, Michio Pa, who had led the pirate fleet stealing from colony ships, betrays Marco, and uses her small fleet of ships to continue their original mission of redistributing pirated supplies to Belt colonies in need. Marco responds to the betrayal by destroying some of her ships.

Fred Johnson decides to call a meeting with all OPA factions that didn’t join the Free Navy. The crew of the Rocinante ferries Fred to Tycho, but are ambushed by Free Navy ships led by Marco. Although they manage to drive off Marco, Fred has a stroke under high-G maneuvers and dies.

Holden leads the meeting with the OPA factions after Fred's demise and convinces the heads of Earth, Mars, and the OPA to form a combined fleet to take on the Free Navy. The consolidated fleet devises a plan to take back Medina Station, considered to be the most strategically important military objective, as it controls access to the Ring network. The consolidated fleets, including Michio Pa's fleet of pirates, will launch a massive military offensive all across the Solar System at the Free Navy. The distraction allows the Rocinante to escort thousands of small, unmanned craft on board the ice hauler 'Giambattista' to the Ring, overwhelming the rail guns installed in the Slow Zone. Once the Rocinante has control of the rail guns, a second wave of ships will take Medina back.

The offensive distracts the Free Navy as planned, although the consolidated fleet takes heavy losses and Michio Pa's fleet is crippled. Although the Rocinante reaches the Ring, the force taking the rail guns, led by Bobbie, is surprised by the presence of Duarte's marines defending the guns. Unable to take control of them, Bobbie instead destroys the guns by destroying the nuclear reactor powering them. Although Medina Station surrenders to the Rocinante, without the guns, the station is completely undefended from a counterattack by the Free Navy. Marco Inaros quickly orders the rest of the Free Navy to travel to Medina Station under heavy burn, hoping to retake the station and deal a major blow to the consolidated fleet. Filip Inaros, after several conflicts with his father throughout the book, decides to leave him and stay behind on Callisto, changing his name to "Filip Nagata".

Naomi analyses the data on disappearing colony ships and figures out the circumstances under which ships disappear when passing through Ring gates: when a certain threshold of mass passing through a gate is reached, and a ship passes through closely afterward, that ship will disappear. In a desperate final attempt to stop the Free Navy from retaking the station, the Coalition sends the right amount of mass through the Ring, timing it so that Marco’s ships disappear upon entering the Ring. Marco, and the rest of the Free Navy, disappear to some unknown fate.

Six months later, the heads of the major Solar System governments meet to determine how to rebuild after the war with the Free Navy. The Laconia gate has been blockaded by Earth, but so far Duarte has not attempted to leave the system. Holden proposes setting up a transport union of belters, to manage the flow of resources from the colonies back to the solar system to rebuild the infrastructure. Although Avasarala attempts to appoint Holden as the head of this union, he refuses, instead appointing Michio Pa. Holden and the crew of the Rocinante, now permanently including Bobbie and Clarissa, will instead provide freelance work for the union, much as they had done for the OPA before it.

With the Free Navy removed from the equation, the gates to the stars are reopened.

== Characters ==
There are two categories of characters in The Expanse novels, those acting as chapter narrators (the "POV characters"), and those additional characters who, though not narrating, are nevertheless significant in the development of the novels' plot. Babylon's Ashes features a larger number of POV characters compared to previous entries, with a total of fifteen.

The POV characters of the novel, including in its Prologue and Epilogue, include the crew of the Rocinante, returning Martian colleague Bobbie Draper, U.N. Secretary and "earther" Chrisjen Avasarala, and "belter" and Free Navy leader Marco Inaros, as well as earlier series notables like Praxidike Meng, and peripheral characters like Namono, spouse of earlier principal character Anna Volovodov:

- James Holden, Captain of the Rocinante.
- Naomi Nagata, one of the best engineers in the solar system and XO of the Rocinante.
- Alex Kamal, Martian pilot of the Rocinante.
- Amos Burton, Earther mechanic on the Rocinante.
- Clarissa Mao, is the younger sister of Julie Mao. She wanted to kill James Holden, but eventually became part of the crew on the Rocinante.
- Bobbie Draper, former Martian Marine and now military advisor to Avasarala and crew member of the Rocinante.
- Chrisjen Avasarala, UN president of Earth, residing on Luna after the Free Navy attacks on Earth.
- Marco Inaros, leader of the Free Navy and father to Filip. He strives to create an independent Belter state. He uses terrorism and war to show the strength of Belters to Earth and Mars, hoping to enforce respect and their acceptance of an independent Belt.
- Filip Inaros, son of Marco Inaros and Naomi Nagata.
- Fred Johnson, a former Earth military leader, who has changed sides after unwittingly being responsible for a mass murder of Belters. He runs Tycho station.
- Anderson Dawes, Governor of Ceres Station and long-time OPA leader.
- Michio Pa, former Free Navy captain.
- Praxidike Meng, plant researcher at Ganymede.
- Salis, Jakulski, Roberts, and Vandercaust, workers on Medina Station.
- Namono, also known as "Nono", is the spouse of Anoushka "Anna" Volovodov, a religious leader and principal character featured in Abaddon's Gate, also mother of their daughter Nami, and in her appearance in the Prologue living on subsistence with that family in Abuja, Nigeria, after the North African strike (meteorite attack) by the "belter" New/Free Navy (in the events of the previous Expanse novel).

== Reception ==
Niall Alexander wrote that Babylon's Ashes is "[n]arratively... the polar opposite of its predecessor, which breathed in where this book breathes out." The previous novel focused on the backstories of the main characters of the Rocinante crew, and then their intersections with past critical characters; Alexander wrote that "rather than casting the core four—Holden, Naomi, Amos and Alex—as our central perspectives, as in Nemesis Games, [this] saga explodes outwards to include more narrators than The Expanse has ever had to handle, as if to say: this isn’t just about our jokers anymore", but the whole of the system's humanity, belters and earthers and Martians, however impacted by events.

== Short story ==
"Strange Dogs" is a short story published by James S.A. Corey, set between Babylon's Ashes and its sequel Persepolis Rising.
