= Ty Franck =

American novelist, screenwriter, and television producer (born 1969)

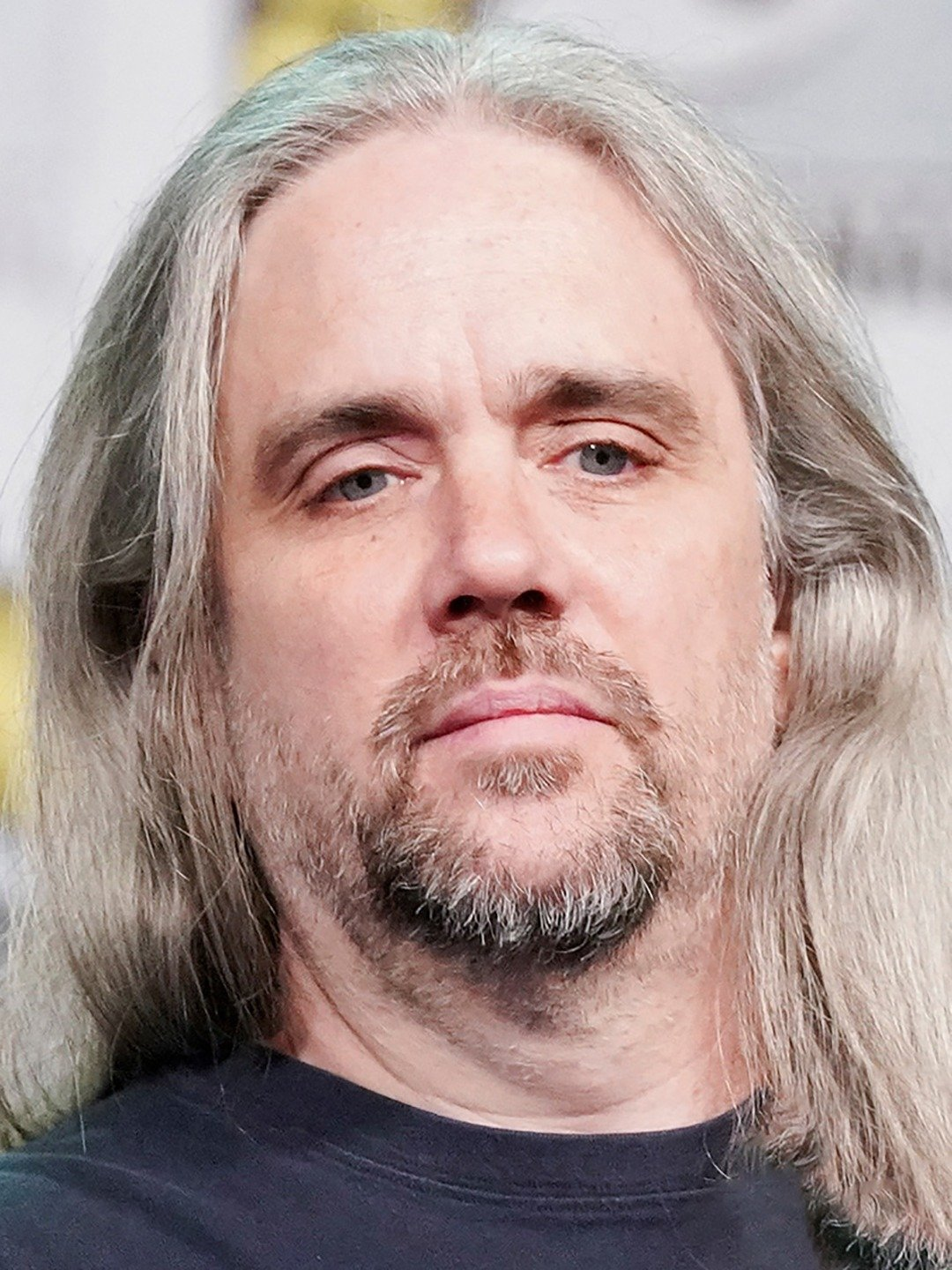
- Franck in 2021
- Born: Ty Corey Franck; May 18, 1969 (age 57); Portland, Oregon, U.S.
- Occupations: Novelist; screenwriter; producer
- Writing career
- Pen name: James S. A. Corey
- Genres: Fantasy; Science fiction; Horror
- Notable work: The Expanse

Ty Corey Franck (born May 18, 1969) is an American novelist, screenwriter, and television producer. He is best known for co-authoring The Expanse with Daniel Abraham under the pseudonym James S. A. Corey, as well as Game of Thrones: A Telltale Games Series (2014) and The Expanse: Expanded (2016). The Expanse novels have been adapted into the television series The Expanse (2015–2022), with both Franck and Abraham serving as writers and producers on the show.

Franck wrote the Star Wars novel Honor Among Thieves (2014) with Abraham and used the pen name James S. A. Corey again. In addition to his own work, Franck has served as personal assistant to George R. R. Martin and has written for Martin's Wild Cards universe.

Leviathan Wakes, book one of The Expanse, was nominated for the 2012 Hugo Award for Best Novel, while The Expanse series was nominated in 2017 and again in 2020 where it won.

== Career ==
=== The Expanse ===
In 2011, Franck launched a new science fiction series, The Expanse, co-authored with Daniel Abraham under the pseudonym James S. A. Corey. The books are based on a role-playing game set up by Franck, who had developed a science fiction universe that spanned the Solar System. After Franck moved to New Mexico and became part of the science fiction writing community, he set up several campaigns of the game, one that included Abraham as a player. Abraham was impressed by the amount of research and world-building Franck had done and asked to write a novel set in the game's universe. Franck agreed and decided to split the proceeds of the book with Abraham for his part in writing from Franck's notes and outline. After reading Abraham's first chapters, Franck decided to become more involved with the writing. The pair collaborate on the overarching plot, meeting weekly to outline chapters, with Abraham focusing on structure and prose, and Franck developing the story and world. They alternate chapters, writing for different characters each, with Abraham writing Miller, Melba, Avasarala, Bull, and Prax, then swap and rewrite the other's work. By the end of the process, Abraham has stated it would be hard to identify which line was written by which author.

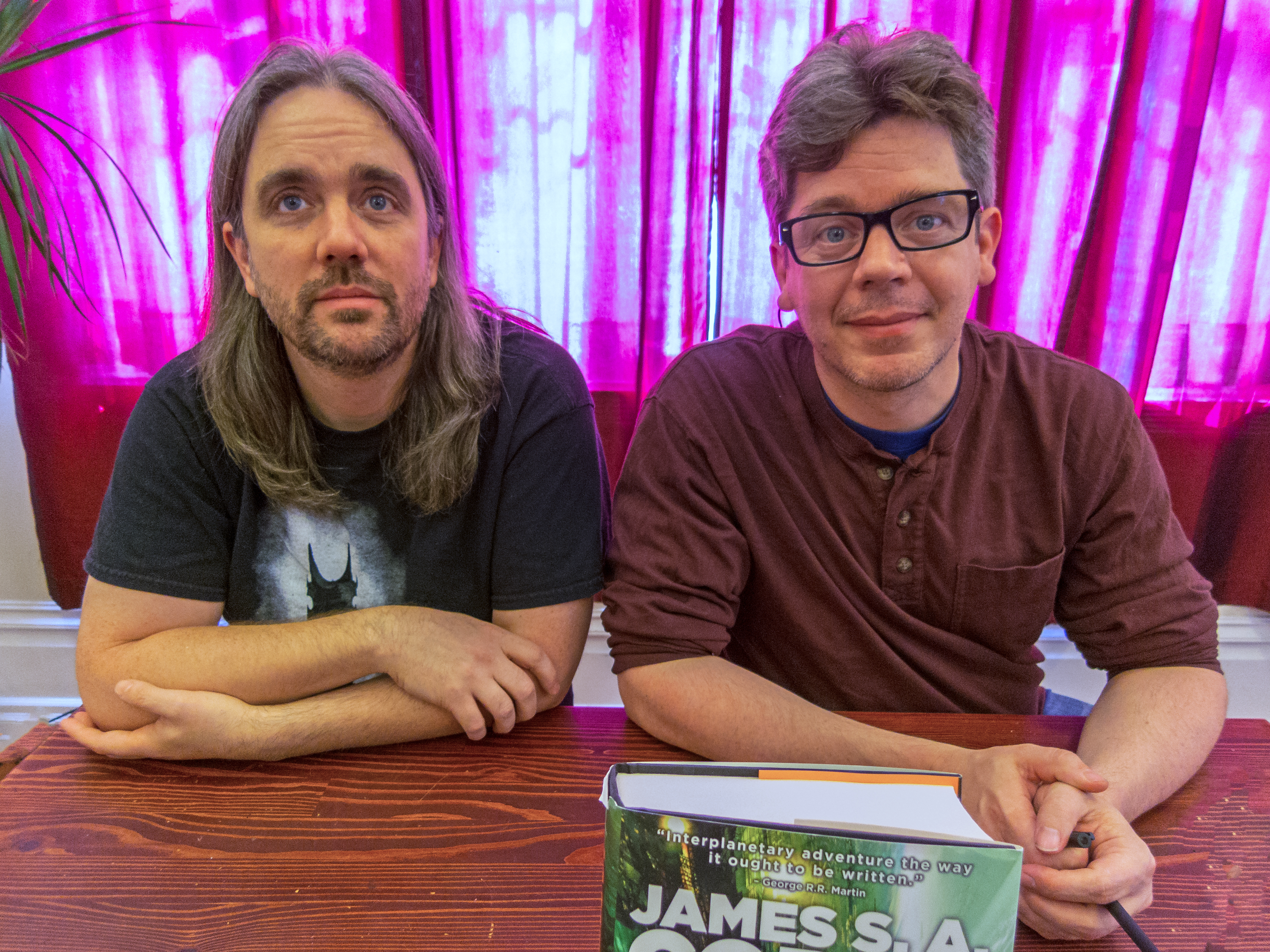
James S.A. Corey (Ty Franck, left, and Daniel Abraham) in 2014

The first book, Leviathan Wakes, was published in June 2011 by Orbit, Abraham's publishing house for his fantasy series The Dagger and the Coin. The novel was nominated for the Hugo Award in 2012 and received acclaim from the science fiction community. A prequel short story titled "The Butcher of Anderson Station" was published in October 2011 and provides background to one of the secondary characters of Leviathan Wakes, Colonel Fred Johnson.

Its sequel, Caliban's War, was published in June 2012. The novel expanded the number of point of view characters from two to four, which according to Abraham, allowed for more freedom to explore the characters' situations. The novel was followed by a novella, Gods of Risk, published in September 2012. The story takes place between the second and third books of the series, and is set in the same time period as the main novels but follows a separate story-line. A second prequel short story, "Drive", was published in the anthology Edge of Infinity in November 2012, set decades before the first novel.

The third book, Abaddon's Gate, was released in June 2013, and won the Locus Award for Best Science Fiction Novel. A second prequel novella, The Churn, was published in April 2014 and features the main series character Amos Burton.

The fourth book, Cibola Burn, was published in June 2014, the first novel in the series to be released in hardcover. The fifth book, Nemesis Games, was released in June 2015, and was praised by Andrew Liptak of io9 as "Corey's Empire Strikes Back." It was followed by the novella The Vital Abyss in October 2015.

The sixth book, Babylon's Ashes, was released in December 2016; and the seventh, Persepolis Rising, in December 2017. The eighth is Tiamat's Wrath (2019) and the series final Leviathan Falls (2021).

In November 2024, it was announced that a production company Expanding Universe co-founded by Franck with Daniel Abraham, Breck Eisner and Naren Shankar has a development deal with Amazon MGM Studios, with their first project, a television adaptation of The Captive's War trilogy, being co-written and co-executive produced by Franck.

== Published works ==
=== The Expanse series ===
The Expanse space opera novels and novellas are written by Abraham and Ty Franck under the joint pseudonym James S. A. Corey.

- Leviathan Wakes (June 15, 2011)
- Caliban's War (June 26, 2012)
- Abaddon's Gate (June 4, 2013)
- Cibola Burn (June 5, 2014)
- Nemesis Games (June 2, 2015)
- Babylon's Ashes (December 6, 2016)
- Persepolis Rising (December 5, 2017)
- Tiamat's Wrath (March 26, 2019)
- Leviathan Falls (November 30, 2021)

==== Related works ====
- The Butcher of Anderson Station (The Expanse short story) (2011)
- Gods of Risk (The Expanse novella) (2012)
- Drive (The Expanse short story) (2012)
- The Churn (The Expanse novella) (2014)
- The Vital Abyss (The Expanse novella) (2015)
- Strange Dogs (The Expanse novella) (2017)
- Auberon (The Expanse novella) (2019)
- The Sins of Our Fathers (The Expanse novella) (2022)
- Memory's Legion (Collection book containing all The Expanse novellas) (2022)

=== The Captive's War trilogy ===
The Captive's War novels and novellas are written by Abraham and Ty Franck under the joint pseudonym James S. A. Corey.

- The Mercy of Gods (August 6, 2024)
- The Faith of Beasts (April 14, 2026)

==== Related works ====
- Livesuit (novella, October 1, 2024)

=== Other novels ===
- Honor Among Thieves (with Daniel Abraham as James S. A. Corey) (Star Wars: Empire and Rebellion, book 2) (2014)

=== Collections ===
- Leviathan Wept and Other Stories (May 31, 2010)
