= James S. A. Corey =

Pseudonymous authors of the science fiction series The Expanse

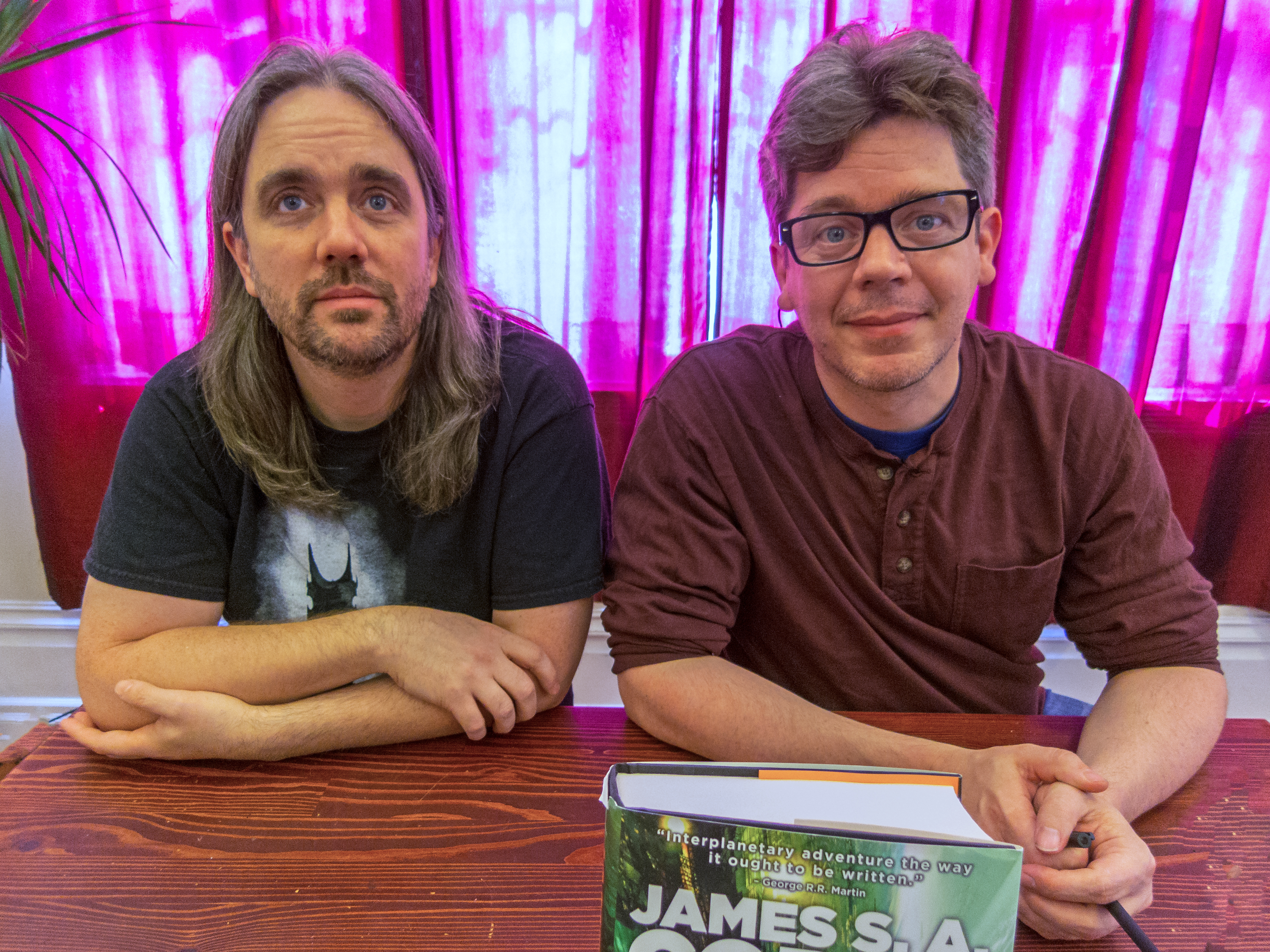
- Co-authors using the pen name, Ty Franck (left) and Daniel Abraham (right) in 2014.
- Writing career
- Period: 2011–present
- Genre: Science fiction
- Notable work: The Expanse series
- Website: jamessacorey.com

James S. A. Corey is the pen name used by collaborators Daniel Abraham and Ty Franck, authors of the science fiction series The Expanse. The first and last name are taken from Abraham's and Franck's middle names, respectively, and S. A. are the initials of Abraham's daughter. The name is also meant to emulate many of the space opera writers of the 1970s.

== Career ==
Under the pen name James S. A. Corey, fantasy author Daniel Abraham began to collaborate with Ty Franck (who had worked as a personal assistant to George R. R. Martin) in 2011. Together they wrote Leviathan Wakes (2011), the first science fiction novel in the series The Expanse. Leviathan Wakes was nominated for the 2012 Hugo Award for Best Novel and the 2012 Locus Award for Best Science Fiction Novel. The authors began to release other novels in the series, including Caliban's War (2012), Abaddon's Gate (2013), Cibola Burn (2014), Nemesis Games (2015), Babylon's Ashes (2016), and Persepolis Rising (2017). Abaddon's Gate won the Locus Award. Orbit Books signed the authors to write additional books in the Expanse series to bring the total to nine. The eighth book in the series, Tiamat's Wrath, was released on March 26, 2019. The final installment, Leviathan Falls, was reportedly turned in to the publisher on May 17, 2021, and was released on November 30, 2021.

The Expanse series was nominated for the Hugo Award for Best Series in 2017 and won in 2020.

Between full-length books, they published shorter works in the series. The first, a short story entitled The Butcher of Anderson Station: A Story of The Expanse, was released as an eBook in October 2011. A 69-page novella, Gods of Risk, followed and was released as an eBook in September 2012. A short story entitled “Drive” was released in November 2012 as a part of the anthology Edge of Infinity. Another novella, The Churn, was released April 29, 2014, and other novellas have followed. All are set in The Expanse universe.

The authors have also written a Star Wars novel, Honor Among Thieves, published by Random House in 2014, and a short story unrelated to The Expanse titled “A Man Without Honor”, included in the anthology Old Mars, edited by George R. R. Martin.

In May 2018, Orbit Books announced Corey's new space opera trilogy. In November 2023, the release date of The Mercy of Gods, first book of The Captive's War series, was announced. The first chapter of the book was published on May 28, 2024, on Polygon. The book, released on August 6, 2024, became an instant New York Times bestseller.

In September 2023, the duo started writing a new novel, with their collaborative process being open to their Patreon audience. The project James S. A. Corey Writes a Novel was inspired by Harlan Ellison's experiment of writing in the bookshop windows.

In November 2024, the duo announced the formation of a company, Expanding Universe, in partnership with Naren Shankar and Breck Eisner, and a TV adaptation of The Captive’s War book trilogy at Amazon.

== Bibliography ==
=== The Expanse series ===
==== Novels ====
1. Leviathan Wakes (2011)
2. Caliban's War (2012)
3. Abaddon's Gate (2013)
4. Cibola Burn (2014)
5. Nemesis Games (2015)
6. Babylon's Ashes (2016)
7. Persepolis Rising (2017)
8. Tiamat's Wrath (2019)
9. Leviathan Falls (2021)

==== Stories and novellas ====
- Memory's Legion: The Complete Expanse Story Collection (2022)
  - Drive (novella, 2012)
  - The Butcher of Anderson Station (novella, 2011)
  - Gods of Risk (novella, 2012)
  - The Churn (novella, 2014)
  - The Vital Abyss (novella, 2015)
  - Strange Dogs (novella, 2017)
  - Auberon (novella, 2019)
  - The Sins of Our Fathers (novella, 2022)
- The Last Flight of the Cassandra (novella contained in The Expanse: The Role-playing Game, 2019)

=== The Captive's War trilogy ===
==== Novels ====
- The Mercy of Gods (August 6, 2024)
- The Faith of Beasts (April 14, 2026)
- Untitled third novel (TBA)

==== Stories and novellas ====
- "Livesuit" (novella, October 1, 2024)

=== Other novels ===
- Star Wars: Honor Among Thieves (Star Wars: Empire and Rebellion, book 2) (2014)

=== Short fiction ===
- "A Man Without Honor", Old Mars, eds. George R. R. Martin and Gardner Dozois (2013)
- "Silver and Scarlet" (Star Wars story), Star Wars Insider No. 148 (2014)
- "The Drones", Popular Science (2015)
- "Rates of Change", Meeting Infinity, ed. Jonathan Strahan (2015)
- "The Hunger After You're Fed", Wired (2016)
- "How It Unfolds", The Far Reaches No. 1 (2023)
- "Judas Iscariot Didn’t Kill Himself: A Story in Fragments", The Last Dangerous Visions, ed. Harlan Ellison (2024)
