= Nemesis Games =

2015 novel by James S. A. Corey

- First edition
- Author: James S. A. Corey
- Cover artist: Daniel Dociu
- Language: English
- Series: The Expanse
- Genre: Science fiction
- Published: June 2, 2015
- Publisher: Orbit Books
- Publication place: United States
- Media type: Print; Audiobook; E-book
- Pages: 536
- Preceded by: Cibola Burn
- Followed by: Babylon's Ashes

Nemesis Games is a 2015 science fiction novel by James S. A. Corey, the pen name of Daniel Abraham and Ty Franck, and the fifth book in their The Expanse series. It is the sequel to Cibola Burn. The cover art is by Daniel Dociu. Nemesis Games has received positive reviews. The novel has been referred to as "Corey’s 'Empire Strikes Back'".

The title refers to Nemesis, the Greek goddess of vengeance and retribution.

== Plot ==
At Martian shipyards on Callisto, a team of soldiers from a radical cell of the OPA steals radar-absorbing stealth coating before destroying the shipyards with an asteroid.

A year later, the Rocinante is down for long-term maintenance at Tycho station after the events of Cibola Burn. The crew members decide to take care of some personal business during the down time. Amos Burton heads to Earth when he learns his parent figure there has died, both to pay his formal respects, and to make sure no foul play was involved. Alex Kamal heads to Mars in the hopes of getting closure with his ex-wife. Naomi Nagata heads to Ceres station when she receives a message from her former lover Marco Inaros, although she doesn't tell any of her crew-mates why she is leaving.

On Earth, Amos pays respects to his mother figure. Afterwards, Amos goes to visit Clarissa Mao in prison, whom he had grown close to on their journey back from the Slow Zone in Abaddon's Gate.

Jim Holden remains on Tycho and supervises repairs to the Rocinante. He is approached by documentary producer Monica Stuart to investigate disappearing colony ships headed for the new worlds. Although Stuart is convinced the Protomolecule is responsible, Holden thinks that rogue factions within the OPA are stealing ships and repurposing them. Holden traces one of the disappearing ships to an asteroid cluster near Mars, and forwards the data to Alex to go take a look.

Alex's ex-wife rebuffs his attempts to reconnect, and he instead finds himself working with Bobbie Draper, who takes advantage of his presence to try to investigate missing Martian warships. After they're attacked and nearly killed by an unknown group, they take the Razorback, still in Bobbie's possession after the events of Caliban's War, to investigate the asteroid coordinates Holden sent, where they stumble upon a large fleet of stolen Martian ships.

Meanwhile, on Ceres, it is revealed that Naomi has a son, Filip, with Marco. Naomi spent her youth involved with his radical OPA cell, but left after he tricked her into coding a software override on ship reactors that he used to kill hundreds of Earthers. Marco took Filip from her to attempt to control her, but she managed to escape his cell, and signed on with the Canterbury. Now, years later, Marco's message had claimed that Filip was in trouble to lure Naomi back into his grasp. Marco's forces kidnap Naomi. He explains that he sees the existence of the gates to other solar systems as an existential threat to the Belt, as humanity will not need the Belt's resources with a thousand new planets to exploit. Marco has been stealing Martian ships to take control of the Solar System, creating a fleet he calls the "Free Navy."

The Free Navy launches a massive, multi-pronged terror attack across the Solar System. Simultaneously, they launch an attack on Tycho Station (and steal the sole remaining Protomolecule sample), take control of Medina station in the Slow Zone, and attack a convoy transporting the Martian Prime minister. Worst of all, they launch multiple asteroids covered in stealth coating at Earth, devastating the planet and causing an extinction level event. Amos survives the impact event. Working together with Clarissa Mao and former criminal syndicates from his past, he manages to find a ship and escapes the planet.

Alex and Bobbie, who had stumbled onto the Free Navy fleet just before they launched their attack, rendezvous with the Martian convoy. Under heavy fire from fake reinforcements that were really Free Navy ships, the Martian prime minister flees on the Razorback with Alex and Bobbie towards Luna.

Meanwhile, Marco reveals his plans to destroy the Rocinante by sabotaging its reactor, but Naomi manages to send out a broadcast to warn Holden. His plan foiled, Marco instead sends out a ship rigged to explode when the Rocinante gets close, luring Holden with a fake distress call using Naomi's voice. Naomi fakes her own death, sneaking onto the booby trapped ship instead, and warns the approaching ships of the trap. She is rescued by Alex and Bobbie.

The crew reunites on the Rocinante. What's left of the Earth, Mars and the non-militant OPA government meet on Luna. Naomi finally tells Jim about her violent past. Amos asks that Clarissa stay as his apprentice. The Free Navy, having wreaked devastation on the solar system, retreats past the belt and prevents colonists from going through the rings.

At the book's end, it is revealed that the Free Navy's creation was orchestrated by a rogue faction of the Martian government led by Admiral Winston Duarte with the purpose of trapping Earth and the Belt in a war. Furthermore, it is revealed that some of the disappearing colony ships were not actually stolen by the Free Navy, and are instead being consumed by a force within the gates.

== Characters ==
- James Holden, Captain of the Rocinante and increasingly competent and trusted negotiator and troubleshooter of the solar system, has been leading his crew on hunting various pirates throughout the system and working for the OPA when the crew decides to, for the first time in the series, split up to handle various business in life.
- Naomi Nagata, the XO and engineer of the Rocinante, who discovers that her son wants her to join for a project which turns out to be the free navy's attack on the inner planets. Her former husband Marcos Inaros is revealed throughout the novel to be manipulative and cruel to her before she fled the crew.
- Alex Kamal, the current pilot of the Rocinante and former Martian navy pilot. After deciding to head back to Mars to pay his ex-wife and family a visit, he ends up meeting Bobbie and being entangled in the Free Navy attacks on the inner planets.
- Amos Burton, mechanic on the Rocinante. After heading down to Earth to Baltimore, his hometown, and seeing old friends decides to visit Clarissa Mao in prison.
- Bobbie Draper, a former Martian Marine now working in Martian Veteran's Assistance. After Avasarala asks her to look into certain disappearances ends up being attacked and subsequently drawn into the conflict in the solar system.
- Clarissa Mao, a daughter of Jules-Pierre Mao, magnate of Mao-Kwikowski Mercantile from Luna; After she is arrested following the events of Abaddon's Gate is currently living out her life in a maximum security prison on Earth
- Filip Inaros, son of the Free Navy's leader and Naomi Nagata, who is working under his father as part of the Free Navy. He above all believes that what he is doing is right.
- Chrisjen Avasarala, Undersecretary to the UN and despite never having a single vote cast for her, controls more power on Earth than almost everyone else realizes. Partway through the events of the book, she becomes acting general secretary of the UN: The highest ranking political position on Earth.
- Fred Johnson, long-time recognized leader of the Outer Planets Alliance, who has been hiring the Rocinante for various jobs before the events of the novel. Throughout the novel he is attempting to rally other Belters to help stop the Free Navy.
- Marco Inaros, leader of the Free Navy and father to Filip, has been given a large amount of Martian warships by defecting elements of the MCRN and now wishes to rise up against the tyrannical inner planets. He designs and leads the initial strikes against the inner planets and announces that the Free Navy now controls the solar system.

== Reception ==
Nemesis Games has received positive reviews. Andrew Liptak of Gizmodo referred to Nemesis Games as "Corey’s 'Empire Strikes Back'". In speaking with Cher Martinetti of Blastr.com, Daniel Abraham and Ty Franck, together the authors behind the pen name James S.A. Corey, commented that they believed that Liptak had captured the fact that "the book was really emotionally engaging and also totally a set-up for what comes next" [Abraham], and that they were satisfied to have written "[a] middle chapter that actually matters to people" [Franck].

== Publication history ==
- Corey, James S. A. (June 2015). Nemesis Games. The Expanse (hardcover ed.). London, England: Orbit Books (Hachette-Lagardère). p. 536. ISBN 9780316217583.
