= The Expanse (novel series) =

Series of space opera novels by James S. A. Corey

- Leviathan Wakes (2011); Caliban's War (2012); Abaddon's Gate (2013); Cibola Burn (2014); Nemesis Games (2015); Babylon's Ashes (2016); Persepolis Rising (2017); Tiamat's Wrath (2019); Leviathan Falls (2021)
- Author: James S. A. Corey
- Country: United States
- Genre: Science fiction Space opera
- Publisher: Orbit Books
- Published: June 25, 2011 – March 15, 2022
- Media type: Print; Audiobook; E-book

The Expanse is a series of science fiction novels, and related novellas and short stories by James S. A. Corey, the joint pen name of authors Daniel Abraham and Ty Franck. The first novel, Leviathan Wakes, was nominated for the Hugo Award for Best Novel in 2012. The complete series was nominated for the Hugo Award for Best Series in 2017. It later won, following its second nomination for the same award in 2020.

The book series is made up of nine novels and nine novellas compiled in Memory's Legion. The series was adapted for television for Syfy, also under the title of The Expanse. When Syfy canceled the TV series after three seasons, Amazon Prime Video acquired it and produced three more seasons.

== Series overview ==
=== Novels ===
No.	Title	Pages	Audio	Publication date	ISBN
1	Leviathan Wakes	561	20h 56m	June 15, 2011	978-0-316-12908-4
2	Caliban's War	595	21h	June 26, 2012	978-0-316-12906-0
3	Abaddon's Gate	539	19h 42m	June 4, 2013	978-0-316-12907-7
4	Cibola Burn	583	20h 7m	June 17, 2014	978-0-316-21762-0
5	Nemesis Games	544	18h 05m	June 2, 2015	978-0-316-21758-3
6	Babylon's Ashes	608	19h 58m	December 6, 2016	978-0-316-33474-7
7	Persepolis Rising	560	20h 34m	December 5, 2017	978-0-316-33283-5
8	Tiamat's Wrath	544	19h 8m	March 26, 2019	978-0-316-33286-6
9	Leviathan Falls	528	19h 40m	November 30, 2021	978-0-316-33291-0

=== Short stories and novellas ===
No.	Title	Setting	Pages	Audio	Publication date	ISBN
0.1	"Drive"	Before Leviathan Wakes	25	57m	November 27, 2012 (Note: "Drive" was originally published as part of the sci-fi anthology Edge of Infinity edited by Jonathan Strahan. It was made available to read free on the Syfy website.)	978-0-356-51937-1
0.5	The Churn	Before Leviathan Wakes	75	2h 18m	April 29, 2014	978-0-316-21766-8
0.7	The Butcher of Anderson Station	Before Leviathan Wakes	40	1h 1m	October 17, 2011	978-0-316-20407-1
1.5	"The Last Flight of the Cassandra"	During Leviathan Wakes	5		May 14, 2019 (Note: Included in The Expanse Role-Playing Game rulebook published by Green Ronin Publishing.)	978-1-934-54797-7
2.5	Gods of Risk	Between Caliban's War and Abaddon's Gate	75	2h 20m	September 15, 2012	978-0-316-21765-1
3.5	The Vital Abyss	From before Leviathan Wakes to Cibola Burn	74	2h 26m	October 15, 2015	978-0-316-21756-9
6.5	Strange Dogs	Between Babylon's Ashes and Persepolis Rising	64	2h 29m	July 18, 2017	978-0-316-21757-6
7.5	Auberon	Between Persepolis Rising and Tiamat’s Wrath	63	2h 25m	November 12, 2019	978-0-316-43428-7
9.5	The Sins of Our Fathers	After Leviathan Falls	64	2h 23m	March 15, 2022	978-0-316-66907-8
	Memory's Legion: The Complete Expanse Story Collection	Before Leviathan Wakes to after Leviathan Falls	432	16h 22m	March 15, 2022	978-0-316-66919-1

=== Audiobooks ===
All novels and short works except the RPG exclusive short story have been released as audiobooks, with Jefferson Mays as the narrator for the novels and short works that include Drive, The Butcher of Anderson Station, The Vital Abyss, Strange Dogs, Auberon, and The Sins of Our Fathers. Erik Davies was originally the narrator for the novellas The Churn and Gods of Risk; but both have been re-released with Jefferson Mays narrating them as of December 28, 2021. While most of Memory's Legion is narrated by Jefferson Mays, the author's note portions are narrated by Daniel Abraham and Ty Franck.

== Setting ==
The Expanse is set in a future in which, after the creation of the Epstein Drive, a fusion engine capable of producing continuous acceleration, humanity has colonized much of the Solar System (but does not have interstellar travel). The series initially takes place in the Solar System, using many real locations such as Ceres and Eros in the asteroid belt, the moons of Jupiter and Saturn, and small science bases as far out as Titania around Uranus, as well as well-established domed and underground settlements on Mars and the Moon, referred to as Luna.

At the series beginning, the governments of Earth (led by the United Nations) and Mars control the solar system in an uneasy military alliance, although substantial tensions exist between the two superpowers. Residents of the outer planets, living in stations built in the asteroid belt and the moons of Jupiter and Saturn, are referred to as "Belters". Due to the lack of gravity, they develop thin, elongated bodies, and have developed a creole language due to their physical isolation from Earth and Mars, with heavy influences from German, Chinese, and especially Spanish. Belters perform much of the gritty labor work to mine resources for the inner planets, which in turn control access to most necessary biological resources. As a result, substantial tensions exist between the Belt and the governments of Earth and Mars, proliferating itself through the existence of the Outer Planets Alliance, a fractured government and militant group that fights for Belter independence (labelled as a terrorist organization by the inner worlds).

As the series progresses, humanity gains access to thousands of new worlds by use of the rings, an artificially sustained wormhole network, created by a long-dead alien civilization. The ring in the Sol system is a thousand-mile diameter structure located two AU outside the orbit of Uranus. Passing through it leads to a hub of starless space approximately one million kilometers across, with more than 1,300 other rings, each with a star system on the other side. In the center of this hub, which is also referred to as the "slow zone" after the third novel, a highly defended alien space station controls the gates and can also set instantaneous speed limits on objects inside the hub as a means of defense.

== Characters ==
Narrative point of view
Name	Books
James Holden	1, 2, 3, 4, 5, 6, 7, 8 (prologue, Interlude, epilogue), 9
Amos Burton	5, 6, 7, 9 (2 interludes)
Alex Kamal	5, 6, 7, 8, 9
Naomi Nagata	5, 6, 7, 8, 9
Josephus Miller	1
Julie Mao	1 (prologue)
Fred Johnson	1 (epilogue), 6
Bobbie Draper	2, 4 (prologue), 6, 7, 8
Chrisjen Avasarala	2, 4 (epilogue), 6
Praxidike Meng	2, 6
Mei Meng	2 (prologue)
Clarissa Melpomene Mao	3, 6, 7
Annushka Volovodov	3, 6 (epilogue)
Carlos 'Bull' C de Baca	3
Manéo Jung-Espinoza	3 (prologue)
Dimitri Havelock	4
Basia Merton	4
Elvi Okoye	4, 8, 9
The Investigator	4 (interludes)
Filip Inaros	5 (prologue), 6
Sauveterre	5 (epilogue)
Marco Inaros	6
Anderson Dawes	6
Michio Pa	6
Salis	6
Jakulski	6
Vandercaust	6
Roberts	6
Namono	6 (prologue)
Paolo Cortazár	7 (prologue)
Santiago Jilie Singh	7
Camina Drummer	7
Winston Duarte	7 (epilogue), 9 (prologue)
Teresa Duarte	8, 9
Anton Trejo	9 (prologue)
Aliana Tanaka	9
Fayez Sarkis	9
Kit Kamal	9
Cara Bisset	9 (interludes)
Jillian Houston	9
Ekko Levy	9
Marrel Imvic	9 (epilogue)

The story is told through the points-of-view of many main characters. There are two POV characters in the first book and four in books two through five. In the sixth and seventh books, the number of POV characters increases, with several characters having only one or two chapters. The eighth book returned to a more limited number with five. In the final ninth book, there is an increase in POVs with some chapters having multiple POV characters. Every book also begins and ends with a prologue and epilogue told from a unique character's perspective, who will occasionally interject in the main body of the novel.

=== Crew of the Rocinante ===
The central characters of The Expanse are the crew of the Rocinante, a salvaged Martian naval gunship.

The main crew, present in all nine books, consists of:

- James "Jim" R. Holden, the captain of the Rocinante, former UN Navy (UNN) officer; from Earth.
- Naomi Nagata, chief engineer and executive officer; a Belter.
- Amos Burton, mechanic and general muscle; an Earther with a mysterious past.
- Alex Kamal, pilot of the Rocinante, former Mars Congressional Republic Navy (MCRN) pilot; a Martian.

Throughout the progression of the series, several additional members join the crew for various lengths of time:

- Roberta "Bobbie" W. Draper, Martian gunnery sergeant in the MCRN, of the 2nd Marine Expeditionary Force, later UN diplomat. Part of the crew of the Rocinante from Book 6 to Book 8.
- Clarissa "Claire" Melpomene Mao, a daughter of Jules-Pierre Mao, magnate of Mao-Kwikowski Mercantile from Luna; she uses the alias Melba Koh while working as a licensed electrochemical technician. After forming a bond with her, Amos gives her the nickname Peaches. Part of the crew of the Rocinante from Book 6 to Book 7.
- Teresa Duarte, the daughter and heir of the High Consul of Laconia. Given the nickname Tiny by Amos Burton. Part of the crew of the Rocinante from Book 8 to Book 9.

=== The Outer Planets ===
- Josephus "Joe" Aloisus Miller, a Belter who worked as a detective for the Ceres station security firm, Star Helix Security. Frequently referred to as Detective Miller.
- Juliette "Julie" Andromeda Mao, the oldest child of Earther plutocrat Jules-Pierre Mao, former pinnace racer and Outer Planets Alliance convert.
- Frederick "Fred" Lucius Johnson, a former UN marine reviled as the "Butcher of Anderson Station," and now serves as the leader of the Outer Planets Alliance (OPA), a loose network which represents the Belters.
- Dr. Praxidike "Prax" Meng, the chief botanist of the RMD-Southern soy farm project on Ganymede and father of Mei Meng.
- Mei Meng, daughter of Prax.
- Carlos "Bull" C de Baca, a member of the OPA serving as chief security officer aboard the Behemoth.
- Michio Pa, executive officer of the OPA ship Behemoth, later captain of the Free Navy ship Connaught.
- Basia "Baz" Merton, a welder from Ganymede, later citizen of Ilus.
- Manéo "Néo" Jung-Espinoza, a young Belter from Ceres
- Marco Inaros, a commander of Free Navy, a radical OPA branch.
- Filip Inaros, a teenage member of the OPA, and later Free Navy, and son of Marco Inaros and Naomi Nagata.
- Camina Drummer, chief of security at Tycho Station, later president of the Transport Union
- Jakulski, Roberts, Salis & Vandercaust, four techs, working for the Free Navy on Medina Station.

=== Mars ===
- Fayez Okoye-Sarkis, A geologist from Mars who worked on new colony worlds and later married Elvi Okoye.
- Emil Sauveterre, the captain of the MCRN Barkeith.
- Solomon Epstein, inventor of the "Epstein-Fusion Drive". He died testing his machine when he went into deep space with no way to get back.
- Kit Kamal, Son of Alex Kamal from his second marriage. He leaves Mars with his wife and son to the Nieuwestad system.

=== Earth ===
- Dmitri Havelock, a security contractor from Earth and former partner of Detective Miller.
- Chrisjen Avasarala, the UN Assistant Undersecretary of Executive Administration, later UN Secretary General. Most powerful official in the UN for most of her career.
- Dr. Elvi Okoye, a biologist from Earth, now a leading figure among citizens of the new colonies.
- Rev. Dr. Annushka "Anna" Volovodov, a Methodist pastor at St. John's United on Europa and Earth.
- Namono "Nono" Volovodov, wife of Anna, with whom she has a daughter, "Nami".

=== Laconia ===
- Winston Duarte, High Consul of the Laconian Empire, a defector from the Martian navy.
- Paolo Cortázar, a former member of Protogen's nanoinformatics research division, he is now the lead researcher on Laconia.
- Santiago Jilie Singh, a captain in the Laconian Imperial Navy and commander of the Gathering Storm.
- Anton Trejo, High Admiral of the Laconian Imperial Navy and captain of the Heart of the Tempest.
- Aliana Tanaka, a Colonel in the Laconian Imperial Navy and a former officer in the MCRN until defecting.
- Cara Bisset, a ten-year-old child who, with her parents, settled on Laconia. Cara died and was resurrected by the planet's repair drones.

=== Other Colony Systems ===
- Jillian Houston, a member of the Underground and crew member of the Gathering Storm, she hails from the Freehold system.
- Unnamed Gunner, a member of the Underground faction that joined on Ganymede and participated in the Siege of Laconia on the gunship Rocinante, from Brazil Nova.
- Ekko Levy, The captain of the Forgiveness from the planet Firdaws.
- Marrel Imvic, a Linguist on board the Musafir from the Dobridomov system.

== Plot summary ==
The Expanse primarily tells the story of the crew of the gunship Rocinante over more than four decades as they navigate criminal plots, solar-galactic politics, wars, and an alien mystery.

=== Initial trilogy ===
Leviathan Wakes, the first novel in the series, begins with the destruction of the ice freighter Canterbury by unknown forces, and the surviving crew, led by its first officer James Holden, ends up in possession of the gunship MCRN Tachi, later renamed Rocinante by the survivors of the Canterbury and Holden becomes its captain. Together with help from Ceres-based Detective Joe Miller, who is searching for the missing Julie Mao, they uncover a complex plot by the Earth company Protogen to draw the inner planets and belt into a war to distract from a criminal operation where they experimentally infect residents of the asteroid Eros with an extrasolar biological hijacking organism they have discovered, known as the protomolecule. The protomolecule was launched at Earth by an alien civilization 2.5 billion years ago with the intent of hijacking Earth's early biosphere and repurposing the primitive life for their own mysterious purposes, but was unexpectedly captured by Saturn's gravity and crashed on Phoebe. With help from the Outer Planets Alliance, the crew of the Rocinante brings down Protogen, but the protomolecule assimilates Eros and launches itself at its original destination of Earth. Miller manages to redirect Eros to instead crash into Venus, dying in the process. The protomolecule promptly begins assembling a vast, mysterious structure.

In Caliban's War, while assisting Ganymede-based biologist Praxidike Meng with finding his missing daughter, the crew of the Rocinante discover a criminal plot by the Mao-Kwikowski company, in league with rogue elements in the UN government, to manufacture protomolecule-enhanced super soldiers by deliberately infecting immunodeficient individuals with the protomolecule to turn them into weapons. With help from Martian Marine Bobbie Draper and UN politician Chrisjen Avasarala, they find Meng's daughter, destroy the protomolecule soldiers, and bring those responsible to justice. The protomolecule's structure launches off Venus and travels outside the orbit of Uranus, transforming into a large ring shaped wormhole. Holden then begins experiencing visions of Miller.

In Abbadon's Gate, the Rocinante crew is framed for an attack by Clarissa Mao, heir to the Mao-Kwikowski company, who is seeking revenge for the crew destroying her family. They flee through the Ring (and are followed by Earth, Mars, and OPA forces), finding that it leads to the hub of a massive wormhole network consisting of 1300 gates, termed the Slow Zone. Led by the vision of Miller to an alien station at the center of the Slow Zone, Holden experiences a vision of the history of the alien civilization that built the protomolecule and the gates, seeing that they were attacked by mysterious forces and had shut down the gate network in a vain attempt to prevent their extinction. After the crew of the Rocinante violently defeats a group that intends to destroy the Ring in a foolish attempt to protect humanity from its evils, the network of wormholes is reopened and humanity begins colonizing the stars.

=== Colony worlds ===
Cibola Burn is a book heavily influenced by westerns which tells the story of one of the early colony worlds through the Ring Network, Ilus, experiencing a confrontation between refugee settlers and the corporation that has been granted rights to it. The crew of the Rocinante is sent to mediate the situation, but they find that the world's alien ruins are reawakening. An alien reactor explodes, creating an extinction level event on the surface of the planet, and reactivating an alien defense network that strands the ships in orbit. Working together to survive, the crew of the Rocinante and the settlers overcome the tremendous odds stacked against them, and demonstrate the feasibility of extrasolar colonies to persevere through disaster.

=== Free Navy Arc ===
In Nemesis Games, sometimes referred to as the series’ Empire Strikes Back, a rogue Martian group led by Winston Duarte sells warships and stealth technology to a radical faction of the OPA headed by Marco Inaros, who creates a fleet known as the Free Navy. Seeing that with the new colony worlds humanity will no longer need the Belt's resources, eliminating any further need for the Belt, Inaros launches a massive, multi-pronged terror attack across the solar system, including launching stealth asteroids at Earth and killing billions. Although he attempts to kill the Martian Prime Minister and the crew of the Rocinante as well, both of these plans are foiled. The Free Navy takes control of the Slow Zone and prevents any travel to the colony worlds. Winston Duarte's rogue Martian fleet travels through the rings to the Laconia system and it is revealed that some ships traveling through the gates are disappearing, being consumed by a force within them.

Babylon's Ashes tells the story of the final confrontation between the navies of Earth and Mars and the Free Navy, working with the remaining factions of the OPA, including massive battles to retake the Solar system and the Slow Zone from Free Navy control. Eventually, the crew of the Rocinante figures out how to trigger the ship disappearances while traveling through the gates and uses this to cause Inaros and the rest of the remaining Free Navy to vanish as they attempt to retake the Slow Zone. With the various governments of the solar system realizing that Inaros wasn't wrong that the existence of new colony worlds would result in the inevitable death of the Belt, the OPA is transformed into a Transport Union, giving the Belters a new role as traders between the various solar systems. Meanwhile, Duarte's rogue Martian fleet that traveled to the Laconia system cuts off contact with the rest of humanity.

=== Laconia Arc ===
In Persepolis Rising, set three decades after the Free Navy was defeated, the Laconians reemerge from their gate with advanced, protomolecule-powered technology, including three incredibly powerful dreadnought battleships. Duarte has also been using the protomolecule on himself to make himself essentially immortal. The Laconians easily take control of the Slow Zone and the Sol system, controlling the hub between worlds and creating a galactic empire under Duarte's rule. The Rocinante crew becomes part of the resistance movement, the Underground, on Medina Station in the Slow Zone and successfully manages to stage a revolt that allows them to escape to the various colony worlds. Holden is captured, but the remaining crew of the Rocinante manages to scatter.

In Tiamat's Wrath, the Underground wages a guerrilla war against the Laconian Empire across the colony worlds and the Sol system. In a preemptive strike, Duarte orders a tit for tat attack on the entities that killed the gate-builder civilization and causes ships to go missing. This backfires, leading to attacks on all of humanity by these "dark gods." One such attack leaves Duarte catatonic and the empire in disarray. Meanwhile, the fractured crew of the Rocinante and Underground forces successfully destroy the Laconian dreadnought in the Sol system while a dark gods attack decimates all ships in the Slow Zone, including the second dreadnought and Medina Station. Realizing they will never have a better chance to weaken the Laconian Empire, the crew of the Rocinante lead a massive siege of the Laconian system by the Underground resistance forces and successfully destroy the alien construction platforms that allowed Laconia to build their advanced technology, in addition to rescuing Holden.

In Leviathan Falls, the crew of Rocinante are on the run from the Laconians while the dark gods attacks become more frequent and deadly. Duarte reawakens from his catatonic state with new powers and realizes that to defeat the dark gods, he needs to transform humanity into a hive mind like the protomolecule creators. In a massive final confrontation, the crew of the Rocinante fight Duarte and his hive mind forces in the Slow Zone. Holden injects himself with the protomolecule in order to reawaken the vision of Miller, who helps explain the history of the gate-builders and their plans for humanity. After successfully killing Duarte, Holden realizes what he must do to save humanity from the dark gods and the gate-builder's hive mind. He connects himself to the alien station and, after allowing all ships to escape, destroys the Slow Zone, shutting down the wormhole network between worlds. The crew of the Rocinante, after an emotional goodbye, splits for the final time. In an epilogue set 1000 years later, humanity invents their own form of faster-than-light travel and uses it to finally reconnect the colony worlds, with the epilogue showing the reconnection to Earth.

== Inspiration and writing ==
=== Development ===
Ty Franck began developing the world of The Expanse initially as the setting for a MMORPG and, after a number of years, for a tabletop role-playing game using the d20 Modern system. Daniel Abraham, who had authored a number of novels on his own, suggested, given the depth of the setting, that it could serve for the basis for a series of novels, noting: "People who write books don't do this much research."

The authors have stated that the series gets some of its inspirations from Frederik Pohl's Gateway and the other Heechee Saga books. It has also been observed that there are similarities in the political and social setting of the series to Alfred Bester's classic science fiction novel The Stars My Destination. Ty Franck has also stated Ridley Scott's Alien as having "the single largest influence on The Expanse."

The authors have suggested that The Expanse might well take place in the future of Andy Weir's novel The Martian. In support of this, they created a ship named the Mark Watney after the titular Martian. However, Andy Weir has publicly clarified that the reference was solely a fun reference.

=== Writing process ===
Franck wrote the first drafts of the Holden, Bobbie, and Anna chapters, while Abraham did the Miller, Melba, Avasarala, Bull, and Prax chapters, writers meeting weekly to discuss upcoming chapters and swap completed chapters for the other to edit, at first. The process changed and evolved over the years.

=== Narrative structure ===
The novels are written in third-person limited. Each chapter is told from the point of view of a character central to the story, while the prologue and epilogue are told from the point of view of a recurring character or a one-off viewpoint. Most of the books employ four point-of-view characters (plus the prologue and epilogue viewpoints). Leviathan Wakes features two, Babylon's Ashes features sixteen, Persepolis Rising features eight, and Tiamat's Wrath features five. James Holden is the only character to be used as a viewpoint character in all nine novels.

== Reception ==
=== Critical response ===
The series overall has been well received. Caliban's War was praised by both Wired.com's Geek Dad and Publishers Weekly. GeekDad cited the book's "believable human personalities and technology that is easily recognizable" as a highlight. Publishers Weekly gave Abaddon's Gate a starred review saying "series fans will find this installment the best yet." The same publication gave Cibola Burn a starred review and called it "splendid" and it "blends adventure with uncommon decency." Leviathan Falls won the 2022 Dragon Award for Best Science Fiction Novel. The Expanse won the 2020 Hugo Award for Best Series.

=== Awards and nominations ===
Year	Novel	Award	Category	Result	Ref
2011	Leviathan Wakes	Goodreads Choice Awards	Best Science Fiction	Nominated	
2012	Leviathan Wakes	Hugo Award	Best Novel	Nominated	
2012	Leviathan Wakes	Locus Awards	Best SF Novel	Nominated	
2012	Caliban's War	Goodreads Choice Awards	Best Science Fiction	Nominated	
2013	Caliban's War	Locus Awards	Best SF Novel	Nominated	
2013	Abaddon's Gate	Goodreads Choice Award	Best Science Fiction	Nominated	
2014	Abaddon's Gate	Locus Awards	Best SF Novel	Won	
2014	Cibola Burn	Goodreads Choice Award	Best Science Fiction	Nominated	
2015	Cibola Burn	Locus Awards	Best SF Novel	Nominated	
2015	Nemesis Games	Goodreads Choice Award	Best Science Fiction	Nominated	
2017	Babylon's Ashes	Locus Awards	Best SF Novel	Nominated	
2017	Babylon's Ashes	Goodreads Choice Awards	Best Science Fiction	Nominated	
2017	Babylon's Ashes	Dragon Award	Best Science Fiction Novel	Won	
2017	The Expanse	Hugo Award	Best Series	Nominated	
2018	Persepolis Rising	Locus Awards	Best SF Novel	Nominated	
2018	Persepolis Rising	Goodreads Choice Award	Best Science Fiction	Nominated	
2018	Persepolis Rising	Dragon Award	Best Science Fiction Novel	Nominated	
2019	Tiamat's Wrath	Dragon Award	Best Science Fiction Novel	Nominated	
2019	Tiamat's Wrath	Goodreads Choice Award	Best Science fiction	Nominated	
2019	Tiamat's Wrath	Google Play Users' Choice Awards	User's Choice Book	Nominated	
2020	The Expanse	Hugo Award	Best Series	Won	
2022	Leviathan Falls	Locus Awards	Best SF Novel	Nominated	
2022	Leviathan Falls	Dragon Award	Best Science Fiction Novel	Won	
2022	Leviathan Falls	Goodreads Choice Award	Best Science Fiction	Nominated	

== Cultural impact ==
Alien technology from The Expanse inspired electrical engineer Jennifer Hollenbeck at Johns Hopkins University Applied Physics Laboratory to develop a shape-shifting antenna that dynamically adapts its shape based on temperature, allowing it to handle multiple frequencies and perform the work of several fixed antennas.

== Adaptations ==
=== Television series ===
The American television channel Syfy announced a straight-to-series commitment to a television adaptation of The Expanse in April 2014, ordering the production of ten hour-long episodes for a first season which premiered in December 2015. As of 2022 six seasons consisting of a total of 62 episodes have been produced, with the final episode of each season sharing its name with the respective book. The series stars Thomas Jane as Josephus Miller and Steven Strait as Jim Holden. As for the other crew of the Rocinante, Dominique Tipper was cast as Naomi Nagata, Cas Anvar as Alex Kamal, and Wes Chatham as Amos Burton. The other major cast members are Shohreh Aghdashloo as Chrisjen Avasarala, Chad Coleman as Fred Johnson, and Florence Faivre as Julie Mao. In season 2, Frankie Adams joined the cast as Bobbie Draper.

=== Comics ===
Four digital comics based on the books and tying into the television series were published by ComiXology. The comics were written by James S. A. Corey, Hallie Lambert and Georgia Lee and illustrated by Huang Danlan, Triona Farrell, Juan Useche and Rahzzah. The Expanse: Origins reveals the untold backstories of the crew members of the Rocinante before the start of the series. All four comics were also released in print as a compilation titled The Expanse Vol. 1: Origins by BOOM! Studios, which also featured a new story about Detective Miller.

Title	Character	Publication date	Ref.
The Expanse Origins #1	James Holden	2017-02-01	
The Expanse Origins #2	Naomi Nagata	2017-04-19	
The Expanse Origins #3	Alex Kamal	2017-05-24	
The Expanse Origins #4	Amos Burton	2017-07-12	

A second series of four issues was also published by BOOM! and written by James S. A. Corey and Corinna Bechko, and illustrated by Alejandro Aragon, Francesco Segala and Ed Dukeshire. This miniseries is set between Seasons 4 and 5 of the television show.

In January 2023, it was announced that the continuation of the TV series, set between Babylon's Ashes and Persepolis Rising, would be adapted into a 12-issue comic book series, The Expanse: Dragon Tooth.

=== Board game ===
An Expanse board game, designed by Geoff Engelstein and published by WizKids, was released in October 2017. The authors of the book series collaborated with Engelstein on its development. The game focuses on politics, conquest and intrigue similar to the board game Twilight Struggle, although with a shorter playing time. Players represent Earth's UN forces, the military of Mars, the O.P.A., and Protogen Inc., each struggling to become the dominant power in the Solar System. They use cards and action points to move and place Fleets and expand their Influence in contested areas. The cards represent characters and events from the universe of The Expanse, each bearing key images from the show. Each character has special abilities that must be correctly exploited in order to gain the upper hand in the struggle for control.

The Expanse: Doors & Corners Expansion was announced for release by WizKids in February 2019. It contains five new modules that can be used independently or in any combination together with the base game.

=== Tabletop role-playing game ===
The Expanse Roleplaying Game uses the AGE (Adventure Game Engine) system designed by Chris Pramas. The core rulebook and Gamemaster's Kit launched on Kickstarter in July 2018 and gathered over $400,000 from their campaign. The book was written by game designer Steve Kenson and is published by Pramas' company Green Ronin Publishing. The game allows players to create their own character of the various Solar System factions and adventure through the Solar System and beyond at the various settings or even on their own ships. It includes a bonus short story by James S. A. Corey titled "The Last Flight of the Cassandra".

=== Video games ===
In 2023, an episodic adventure game called The Expanse: A Telltale Series set in the universe of the TV series was released by Telltale Games and Deck Nine.

On June 7, 2025, an announcement trailer was released for The Expanse: Osiris Reborn, an action role-playing game created by Owlcat Games, set to release on Microsoft Windows, PlayStation 5 and Xbox Series X.
