= Cibola Burn =

2014 novel by James S. A. Corey

- First edition
- Author: James S. A. Corey
- Cover artist: Daniel Dociu
- Language: English
- Series: The Expanse
- Genre: Science fiction
- Published: June 17, 2014
- Publisher: Orbit Books
- Publication place: United States
- Media type: Print
- Pages: 591
- ISBN: 978-0-316-21762-0
- Preceded by: Abaddon's Gate
- Followed by: Nemesis Games

Cibola Burn is a 2014 science fiction novel by James S. A. Corey (pen name of Daniel Abraham and Ty Franck) and the fourth book in The Expanse series. It follows the crew of the Rocinante as they join the flood of humanity out into the galaxy, using the gates built by the ancient civilization which also produced the protomolecule. Cibola Burn is heavily influenced by western stories, departing slightly from the previous themes of the series to tell a story of survival on the frontier. At the release of Cibola Burn, Orbit Books announced that James S. A. Corey would write three additional books in the series (adding to two that were already planned) to bring the series to nine novels and various short stories. Cibola Burn serves as the basis for the fourth season of the television series The Expanse, which was released by Amazon Video December 13, 2019.

== Setting ==
After the events of Abaddon's Gate, humanity has gained entry to thousands of new worlds and solar systems through the gate networks. At the start of Cibola Burn the United Nations, Martian and Outer Planets Alliance governments have thus far restricted exploration and colonization efforts to one corporate scientific survey mission to one of these planets, called Ilus or New Terra. Ilus has an earth-like biosphere and life, and is covered with ruins of the alien civilization that built the protomolecule.

Prior to the blockade taking effect, the Barbapiccola, a ship of refugees from Ganymede (displaced by the events of Caliban's War) fled through the ring and founded a lithium mining colony on Ilus called First Landing. Meanwhile, the UN gave settlement rights of the planet to lunar company Royal Charter Energy (RCE), who sends a group of scientists on the ship Edward Israel to the planet to study the alien biosphere, and considers the refugees to be squatters. Both sides claim ownership of the planet in a confrontation reflecting many colonial interactions throughout history.

== Plot summary ==
On Ilus, a group of colonists from First Landing including Basia Merton blow up an RCE landing pad as one of their shuttles lands to stop the corporation from taking control of the planet. Basia triggers the bombs when the shuttle is too close, unintentionally killing dozens of people. The RCE survivors, including biologist Elvi Okoye, are taken in by the citizens of the town and the two sides begin to uneasily coexist, although the knowledge that some of the colonists had been involved in the attack causes tensions to rise. As the situation inches closer to further violence, the UN and OPA decide to send Jim Holden and the crew of the Rocinante to mediate the interactions between the colonists and RCE. Still haunted by the Protomolecule-induced vision of Miller which is urging him to explore the planet to investigate the disappearance of its former inhabitants, Holden agrees.

The group of violent colonists ambush and kill RCE security guards who discover the bombs used to attack the shuttle. The Edward Israel's chief of security, the psychotic Adolphus Murtry, lands on the planet, arriving just before Holden and Amos from the Rocinante. Holden watches as Murtry kills a colonist in cold blood in front of a crowd. Holden's mediation efforts largely fail, and the situation on the planet grows more and more violent. This climaxes when Murtry discovers a colonist plot to kill both him and Holden and retaliates by killing the colonists involved. Basia, who had been involved in the discussions about the plot but decided against participating and warned Holden, is captured. Although Murtry wants to kill him, Holden instead takes custody of Basia in the name of the UN and takes him aboard the Rocinante to await trial. The vision of Miller urges Holden to explore a "blind spot" on the planet where the Protomolecule cannot see.

On the unarmed Edward Israel, the acting chief of security Dmitri Havelock is instructed by Murtry to train a militia of engineers for combat, and to arm a shuttle. The Rocinante crew still in orbit (Naomi and Alex) discover the shuttle and Naomi attempts to sabotage it but is captured by Havelock and detained. While Holden and Murtry argue over her release, a sudden massive explosion on the other side of the planet creates an extinction-level event. With barely any time, the colonists and RCE personnel shelter in alien ruins near First Landing. The shock wave from the explosion destroys the town, although the alien ruins act as adequate shelter for the humans on the surface. A nuclear winter–like weather pattern follows, with constant rain. To make matters worse, the explosion causes an alien defense network in orbit to activate, which shoots down any powered shuttles bringing aid to the surface and disables the reactors of all ships in orbit, causing their orbits to slowly decay and preventing them from reaching the planet's surface.

Trapped on the surface, the colonists, RCE personnel, and Holden's crew confront a lack of food and water, an infestation of toxic worms, and a fungal growth that leads to blindness. Holden is instructed by the vision of Miller to go explore the alien ruins where the blind spot is to disable the planetary defense system. Holden lets the vision of Miller guide him into the alien ruins. Murtry, thinking he is protecting RCE claims to the planet, sets off after him. Elvi, who has grown close to Holden, goes with Amos to warn Holden of the danger.

The humans in orbit try to prevent their imminent demise as a result of the decaying orbits. Desperate to get their engineer Naomi back, Alex dispatches Basia to break her out of the Edward Israel's brig. Although Basia is pinned down by the militia of engineers trained by Havelock, Havelock has a change of heart and frees Naomi, helping to fight the militia and saving Basia. The Rocinante attempts to buy time for the colonists' ship Barbapiccola by towing it into a higher orbit. The engineer militia, under orders from Murtry, attacks the two other ships, disrupting the plan, although Havelock defeats the militia fighters. Now unable to tow the ship up, the Edward Israel and Rocinante crews instead use portable airlocks to rig life support bubbles to bring the crew of the Barbapiccola to the other ships just before its orbit decays and it reenters the atmosphere, saving hundreds of colonists.

Elvi and Amos reach Holden but are ambushed by Murtry. Elvi runs to find Holden while Amos fights him. Murtry shoots and wounds Amos. Holden tells Elvi to go and disable the planetary defense network while he confronts Murtry. Holden shoots Murtry and disables him but, although he believes he deserves death, instead decides to take him back to the Solar System for trial. Elvi is guided by the vision of Miller (who takes a physical form as a protomolecule-controlled robot) and they find the "blind spot" that Miller had been looking for, which is a region of space filled with an unknown substance that destroys any alien technology that comes into contact with it. Miller thinks this is presumably a fragment of the thing that destroyed the protomolecule's creators. At Miller's urging, Elvi carries the machine running the planetary defense network into this region, destroying it. Although she expects to die, the region does not kill her.

With Murtry detained, Holden, the crew of the Rocinante and Havelock leave Ilus to return to the solar system. Basia and Elvi decide to stay on Ilus to rebuild First Landing. With the feasibility of extrasolar colonies demonstrated by the survival of First Landing against all odds, a massive human migration through the Ring to other solar systems begins.

== Characters ==
- Basia Merton is one of the refugees from Ganymede refused safe harbor in the Solar System. His ship pushed through the gate to be the first to settle a new planet. Called Ilus by the inhabitants, they found a rich vein of lithium that could provide a valuable trading commodity with other systems. The United Nations sends a scientific party to the planet with a legal charter to the land. This drives Basia to actions he never thought he would do, and it seems like he has a never-ending set of decisions between bad choices, while he's only trying to do what he thinks is best for his family.
- Elvi Okoye is a scientist on the team sent by the United Nations. Her original task was to try to survey the planet in a pristine state but events make that impossible. Later, she tries to gain insight into the incredible things happening on the planet that make it seem like the most hospitable biosphere found away from Earth may kill them all.
- Dmitri Havelock was Miller's partner on Ceres and is now deputy security chief for the UN mission to New Terra. Remaining aboard the ship that brought him while the security chief relocates to the surface, he becomes increasingly concerned about the actions of his supervisor. Later, the fortunate capture of a prisoner from the Rocinante sets a chain of events into motion with long-term repercussions for humanity.
- James Holden Sensing trouble brewing on Ilus/New Terra, Chrisjen Avasarala sees the need for someone perceived as unbiased to negotiate and report on events there and chooses Jim Holden. After making the journey, the crew tries their best to balance colonial claims, government priority and the awakening creatures on the planet within a crisis greater than all their earlier concerns.
- Joe Miller is still trying to figure out his role within the alien construct, while maintaining his connection with Holden. Eventual clues come together allowing him to shut down the alien machinery and potentially save everyone. However, both the remnants of Miller and The Investigator are killed in the process.

== Reception ==
Publishers Weekly gave Cibola Burn a starred review and called it "splendid".
