= Abaddon's Gate =

2013 novel by James S. A. Corey

- First edition
- Author: James S. A. Corey
- Original title: Dandelion Sky
- Cover artist: Daniel Dociu
- Language: English
- Series: The Expanse
- Genre: Science fiction
- Published: June 4, 2013
- Publisher: Orbit Books
- Publication place: United States
- Media type: Print; Audiobook; E-book
- Pages: 547
- Awards: Locus Award for Best Science Fiction Novel
- ISBN: 978-0-316-12907-7
- Preceded by: Caliban's War
- Followed by: Cibola Burn

Abaddon's Gate is a science fiction novel by James S. A. Corey (pen name of Daniel Abraham and Ty Franck). It is about a conflict in the Solar System that involves the polities of Earth, Mars, the Asteroid Belt and the outer planets, and a mysterious self-replicating alien technology of immense power. It is the third title of The Expanse series and is preceded by Leviathan Wakes and Caliban's War. The series is continued in Cibola Burn. The book was released on 4 June 2013, as well released as an audiobook by Audible, narrated by Jefferson Mays.

Abaddon's Gate was adapted into episodes 7 to 13 of the third season of the television series The Expanse in 2018, with its title taken for the final episode of that season. It was the last book in the series to be adapted before the show's move from Syfy to Amazon Prime.

== Plot summary ==
Six months have passed since the Protomolecule created a structure on Venus and launched off the planet. The alien machinery stops two AU beyond the orbit of Uranus and proceeds to transform into a circular structure that is termed "The Ring." The UN, Mars and the OPA send ships to monitor it. When a young belter attempts to "slingshot" his ship through The Ring on a dare and doesn't emerge out the other side, it is realized that the structure is a wormhole. The UN, Mars, and the OPA scramble to send military fleets out to The Ring in a show of power. The OPA sends the generation ship Nauvoo, now repurposed as the military vessel Behemoth, under the command of Captain Klaes Ashford, with security officer Carlos "Bull" de Baca. The UN also sends a group of religious leaders, artists, and poets on their fleet for public relations purposes. Included in this group is Methodist minister Anna Volovodov, and celebrity pastor Father Cortez.

On Ceres, Holden, Alex, Amos and Naomi are taking a vacation, having made good money using the Rocinante as freelance courier and escort ship. UN Public Broadcasting contacts Holden, wanting to make a documentary about Holden and the Ring. Holden initially refuses, even though a vision of Miller, which has appeared to Holden occasionally since the Protomolecule crashed on Venus, has been urging him repeatedly to go to the Ring. However, the Martians file a lawsuit to take back the Rocinante, and Holden makes a deal with UN Public Broadcasting to do the documentary in exchange for them paying off the Martians.

Meanwhile Clarissa Mao, sister of Julie Mao, plots revenge against Holden, whom she believes caused the downfall of her father Jules-Pierre Mao, who was responsible for the research into the Protomolecule. She gets a job under an assumed identity (Melba Koh) as an engineer on the Cerisier, a UN exploratory ship heading for the Ring. When the Cerisier gets close to the Rocinante, Clarissa sends a signal to the ship, which activates software secretly placed there by a member of the documentary crew whom she bribed. The software takes control of the Rocinante, disables the communication system and controls the weapons, while a bomb simultaneously detonates on one of the other ships heading for The Ring. A faked video message of Holden claiming responsibility for the attack is broadcast.

The joint military fleets, in retaliation to what they perceive as an unprovoked attack, start firing on the Rocinante. Holden, with no other options, flies the Rocinante into the ring to escape. All three major powers send ships into The Ring after the Rocinante, including the OPA flagship Behemoth, with Bull on board, and the ship carrying the religious leaders including Anna and Father Cortez.

The Ring leads to a hub in a massive but dormant wormhole network, with thousands of dormant rings orbiting a spherical object termed Ring Station. Any object within this space traveling faster than 600 m/s is captured by an inertia field and pulled into an orbit circling the station. As a result of this speed limit, the Rocinante crew names the area "The Slow Zone." Once inside the zone, the Rocinante crew repairs the communication system in order to contact the other ships and convince them of Holden's innocence. Amos discovers the planted software. He forces a confession out of the documentary crew member who planted it, who doesn't know Clarissa's name, but draws her face. Holden, thinking it's Julie Mao, assumes that this is another one of the Protomolecule's ploys to manipulate him. Holden decides to go to Ring Station, figuring this is what the Protomolecule wants him to do.

The UN, Martian, and OPA fleets enter the Slow Zone. The Martians launch a skiff in pursuit of Holden, but he reaches the Station before them. The vision of Miller appears and guides Holden deeper and deeper into the Station. He explains that the Protomolecule projects the vision directly into Holden's brain, using it to communicate with him. Both the Protomolecule and the Station were separate tools constructed by an alien race billions of years prior, and both maintain some degree of decision-making autonomy. The Protomolecule, lacking control over the Station, needed Holden to be physically present to open the wormhole network and begin searching for its creators. The Martians catch up to Holden and attack him, but constructions in the Station attack them back. After launching a grenade, one of the Martian marines is ripped apart while the others retreat. The vision of Miller explains that the speed limit in the Slow Zone is merely a form of threat deterrence, and that as a result of the Martian's actions, the Station now considers objects moving at the speed of a grenade a threat and will lower the maximum speed accordingly. Holden and Miller advance through the Station until they encounter a large alien structure. Miller urges Holden to touch it. Upon contact Holden experiences visions of the civilization that built the Protomolecule. They had an empire spanning the galaxy, but were attacked by an unknown entity. Trying to stop the spread of the attack, the Protomolecule's creators used the Station to destroy thousands of star systems, causing them to go supernova. Miller explains he can reopen the network of wormholes in the Slow Zone, but before he can explain how, the Martian marines reappear and arrest Holden. In his cell on a Martian ship, the vision of Miller advises Holden to get all the ships to turn off their reactors. This will show the Station that they are not a threat and convince it to release them from the Slow Zone.

Meanwhile, because of the sudden change in the speed limit, all the ships in the Slow Zone are captured by the inertia field and abruptly and drastically slowed, causing the people inside to experience lethal deceleration. Casualties are extremely high and most of the survivors are heavily wounded. Because no ship can now move faster than a grenade, returning to The Ring would take years, leaving the survivors essentially trapped in the Slow Zone. On the Behemoth, Bull clashes with Captain Ashford about allowing the ship to be used as a refuge. Bull and XO Michio Pa stage a mutiny against Ashford, imprisoning him and taking control of the ship. They arrange to have survivors transported to the Behemoth, where they can be most effectively treated.

On the UN fleet, Clarissa, still seeking revenge against Holden, attempts to board the Rocinante and kill the crew. Anna, who had spotted Clarissa earlier and who after some time worked out who she really was, follows Clarissa to the Rocinante. Aboard the Rocinante, Naomi discovers Clarissa and the two fight as Clarissa attempts to destroy the ship. Clarissa nearly kills Naomi, but Anna arrives just in time to stop her. The Rocinante’s crew is transferred to the Behemoth to receive treatment. Clarissa is imprisoned, and crushed by her failure to harm Holden and experiencing intense guilt about the deaths she has caused, confesses to everything. Knowing Holden is innocent, the Martians release him from custody and he returns to the Behemoth.

Ashford, imprisoned, conspires with Father Cortez to use the Behemoth's powerful communication laser to destroy The Ring, thinking they will save humanity from the "evils" brought by the alien technology. They stage a revolt and take control of the ship back. When Holden hears of the plan, he realizes that if the Station considers humans a serious threat, it could cause the Sun to go supernova as it had done to the other stars he had seen in its vision. Assuming that attempting to destroy the gate could risk the fate of the entire solar system, he gathers a crew of allies including Anna and Bull. A brutal battle ensues as both sides attempt to prevent the other's plan, which Ashford's side is on the brink of winning. In a final desperate attempt, Anna convinces Clarissa to shut down the control system of the Behemoth. Ashford is overpowered, and his plan to destroy The Ring is thwarted.

After all of the trapped ships shut down their reactors as instructed, the vision of Miller appears to Holden and informs him that the Protomolecule has convinced the Station that the ships are not a threat. As a result, the Slow Zone's speed limit is lifted, allowing the trapped ships to escape. Furthermore, the Station reopens more than a thousand of the dormant wormholes surrounding the Slow Zone, each leading to a different planetary system. Miller says the Protomolecule will never stop searching for its creators, even if they are long gone. As its instrument, the Protomolecule will keep using Holden for this search.

Anna convinces Holden to bring Clarissa to Luna to stand trial. In return, she will use her influence to prevent Mars from taking the Rocinante. The OPA leaves the Behemoth (renamed Medina Station) in the Slow Zone as a waystation for ships traveling to the wormholes. Humanity begins to probe the gates that will lead them to the stars.

== Characters ==
- James Holden, captain of the Rocinante, former UN Navy (UNN) officer; from Earth (an Earther). His associates on the Rocinante are pilot Alex Kamal, engineer Naomi Nagata and mechanic Amos Burton.
- Joe Miller's consciousness continues on in disembodied form, now part of the vast protomolecule matrix and used for his investigative capabilities. Talking to and trying to work with James Holden, he has limited insight into the actions taken by the gate, but knows there is a vast tapestry of opportunity and danger associated with it and those who built it, because someone destroyed them.
- Clarissa Mao, younger sister of Juliette "Julie" Andromeda Mao and daughter of Jules-Pierre Mao, who was president of the multi-planet corporation "Mao-Kwikowski Mercantile" also known as "Mao-Kwik". Jules-Pierre was part of various conspiring organisations, all of whom wanted to use the protomolecule for profit.
- Carlos "Bull" de Baca is a former warfighter and friend to Fred Johnson. He's given the job of third in command of the Behemoth, formerly known as the Generation Ship Nauvoo, which the OPA salvaged and repurposed as a warship.
- Klaes Ashford, captain on the Behemoth.
- Michio Pa, XO on the Behemoth, "promoted" to captain after the coup.
- Annushka "Anna" Volovodov is a Methodist pastor from Europa who joined the expedition as part of a UN delegation of religious figures and artists selected to witness the start of a new epoch of human history. Her ship joins others following Rocinante into the gate, and she tries to pull fragile strings of common interest together against the gales of politics, self-interest, and madness driving others in the expedition.
- Monica Stuart works for UN Public Broadcasting. She and her cameraman Cohen go aboard the Rocinante to make a documentary about Holden and the Ring.

== Reception ==
Abaddon's Gate won the 2014 Locus Award for Best Science Fiction Novel. Publishers Weekly gave Abaddon's Gate a starred review saying that "series fans will find this installment the best yet".
