= Daniel Dociu =

Romanian video game art director

- Born: Cluj, Romania
- Occupation: Art director
- Awards: EXPOSÉ 9, Grand Master, Career Achievement

Daniel Dociu is a Romanian video game art director and concept artist. He was the chief art director for NCsoft North America and also worked for its subsidiary ArenaNet until February 2017.

== Life and career ==
Dociu was born in Cluj. He obtained his master's degree in industrial design at the Fine Arts Academy in Cluj in 1982. Throughout the decade, he taught at the academy as an assistant professor and later worked as a graphic designer in Athens, Greece, a product designer and a freelance artist. He moved to the United States in 1990. From 1992 to 2003, Dociu did work for various video game developers including Square, Electronic Arts, and Zipper Interactive.

His face was also used for reference for the character Father Grigori in the critically acclaimed video game Half-Life 2.

His son, Horia Dociu, is also an artist and Art Director for the video game company Sucker Punch Productions and will replace him as the chief art director for NCsoft North America.

== Awards ==
Spectrum, The Best In Contemporary Fantastic Art

- Spectrum 19, Silver Medal, Concept Art
- Spectrum 17, Gold Medal, Concept Art
- Spectrum 16, Gold Medal, Concept Art
- Spectrum 15, Gold and Silver Medal, Concept Art
- Spectrum 14, Gold Medal, Concept Art
- Spectrum 13, Silver Medal, Concept Art
- Spectrum 13-19, numerous pieces published

Lürzer's Archive

- 200 Best Illustrators Worldwide 2011–2012
- 200 Best Illustrators Worldwide 2009–2010

Into The Pixel

- 2012 gallery show selection, one/16 pieces
- 2010 gallery show selection, one/16 pieces
- 2009 gallery show selection, one/16 pieces
- 2008 Judging Panel
- 2007 gallery show selection, one/16 pieces
- 2006 gallery show selection, two/16 pieces

EXPOSÉ, Ballistic Annual

- EXPOSÉ 9, Grand Master, Career Achievement

Past honorees: Syd Mead, H R Giger, Ralph McQuarrie

- EXPOSÉ 7,

Master Award, Concept Art
Cover Illustration, Limited Edition

- EXPOSÉ 6,

Master Award, Environment Art
Excellence Award, Science Fiction Art

- EXPOSÉ 5,

Master Award, Transport Art
Excellence Award, Creature Design
Excellence Award, Science Fiction Art
Excellence Award, Concept Art
Excellence Award, Environment art

- EXPOSÉ 4,

Master Award, Best Environment
Master Award, Best City-scape

== Works ==
- Crimson Skies: High Road to Revenge
- FIFA Soccer 95
- FIFA Soccer 96
- FIFA Soccer 2002
- Guild Wars 2
- Guild Wars: Eye of the North
- Guild Wars Factions
- Guild Wars Nightfall
- Guild Wars Prophecies
- James Bond 007: Everything or Nothing
- James Bond 007: Nightfire
- Half-Life 2
- MechWarrior 3
- MechWarrior: Pirates' Moon
- Need for Speed: Hot Pursuit 2
- Recoil
- ReBoot
- Secret of Evermore
- Shadow Madness (as Worlds Within)
- SOCOM U.S. Navy SEALs
- SSX Tricky
- SSX 3
- Triple Play 2003
