= Babylon's Ashes (The Expanse episode) =

- The Expanse episode
- Episode no.: Season 6 Episode 6
- Directed by: Breck Eisner
- Written by: Daniel Abraham; Ty Franck; Naren Shankar
- Cinematography by: Jeremy Benning
- Original release date: January 14, 2022
- Running time: 65 minutes

Guest appearances
- Kathleen Robertson as Rosenfeld Guoliang; Anna Hopkins as Monica Stuart; Joanne Vannicola as Nico Sanjrani; Ted Dykstra as Gareth; Stuart Hughes as Liang Walker; Brian George as voice on the Zenobia; Vanessa Smythe as Michio; Samer Salem as Josep

Episode chronology
← Previous "Why We Fight"	Next → —

"Babylon's Ashes" is the sixth episode of the sixth and final season of the American science fiction television series The Expanse. It originally premiered on Amazon Prime in the United States on January 14, 2022, written by Daniel Abraham, Ty Franck, and Naren Shankar, and directed by Breck Eisner. The episode title draws its name from the sixth The Expanse novel of the same name written by James S. A. Corey, the joint pen name of Abraham and Franck.

Showrunner Daniel Abraham had announced in 2020 that Season 6 was the ending of the series while noting in later interviews that further seasons could happen, pointing out that there were three more existing books to adapt material from.

"Babylon's Ashes" continues the events of the previous episode, wherein the Inners (residents of the inner planets of the Solar System) and Belters (residents of the asteroid belt's various mining groups) join the crew of the Rocinante in a desperate, high-stakes battle against Marco Inaros and his Free Navy.

The series finale has met with largely positive reviews.

== Plot ==
=== On Laconia ===
Cara's (Emma Ho) parents are horrified when they discover she used the strange, dog-like creatures in the wilderness outside of the colony to resurrect her dead younger brother Xan (Ian Ho), who returns home visibly infected by the protomolecule. Cara's father confirms his fears by watching in horror as Xan immediately heals from a knife wound, and decides to notify the soldiers. Cara and Xan flee into the woods, with Xan pondering why his parents were afraid of him.

=== The Free Navy ===
Aboard the Pella, Marco Inaros (Keon Alexander), fools Camina Drummer's (Cara Gee) Belter attack fleet into attacking the wrong ship and uses the resulting misdirection to cripple Drummer's fleet. As the Pella starts to move away, Drummer prepares to crash her ship into it in a suicide mission that would destroy them both. Liang Walker (Stuart Hughes) does so in her stead, his destroyed ship badly damaging the Free Navy flagship.

Fleeing to the Ring, Inaros contacts the renegade Martian Admiral Duarte (Dylan Taylor) on Laconia, but Duarte denies the Free Navy refuge, rearmament or repair from Laconia. He curtly dismisses Inaros, saying he is busy, having gods to kill.

=== The Rocinante ===
In an attempt to wrest control of the rail gun emplacements on the Ring, the ship uses a remote-controlled ice freighter, the Giambattista, to deliver multiple strike teams to the Ring Station amidst a screen of several hundred decoy cargo containers. Most teams land on the station successfully, but become overwhelmed by the withering firepower of renegade Martian troops stationed to protect the rail guns. Bobbie Draper (Frankie Adams) single-handedly destroys the power source for the rail guns, rendering them inert, and the Rocinante wipes out the remaining Free Navy fighters.

Knowing that Inaros' Free Navy fleet is on its way, Naomi Nagata (Dominique Tipper) suggests that instead of trying to mount a counter-attack, they instead concentrate on awakening the entities dormant within the Ring. Believing she is also killing her son aboard the Pella, she momentarily hesitates before detonating the Giambattista's energy core, serving as the catalyst that awakens the Ring entities which waste no time in obliterating Marco Inaros and his ship. Nagata is overcome with guilt, knowing that while she has ended the war, she believes she has ended the life of her only son in doing so.

Bobbie becomes the new pilot for the Rocinante. Clarissa Mao (Nadine Nicole), discovering that the enhancements she had received have considerably shortened her life, chooses to remain aboard the ship as a mechanic under Amos (Wes Chatham). Holden and Nagata remain together, enjoying their hard-earned moment of peace.

=== The Transport Union ===
The representatives of Earth, Mars and the Belter Union gather to discuss the formation of a transport union to deal with trade headed to and from the Ring, but the Belters, led by Drummer, balk at potentially being constantly outvoted in any substantive decision-making by the Inners. Holden points out that Inaros's success was built on his recognition of the Belters' fear that the fruits of the future would always be held back from them; he adds that the war will only truly end once this fear has been put to rest. Earth's Secretary General Chrisjen Avasarala (Shohreh Aghdashloo) proposes that the transport union be independent, based at Medina Station and led by someone without allegiances to any faction; she nominates Holden because he is respected by Earth, Mars and Belters alike. He reluctantly agrees, but upon taking office, he immediately resigns and appoints Drummer in his place, thus giving the Belters effective control of the Ring traffic to ensure their independence.

Before the episode fades to end credits, the viewer sees the Ring alone in the darkness of space, with occasional, and increasing, ripples of red. A faint blue outline of Duarte's protomolecule warship station can be seen in the center of the Ring.

== Production ==
The episode, entitled "Babylon's Ashes", was written by show creators Daniel Abraham, Ty Franck, and Naren Shankar, using the same title as the sixth book of the novel series, and directed by Breck Eisner. It is the sixth episode and 62nd overall episode of the series, serving as both the season and series finale. The episode itself, which draws upon both the sixth book as well as the 2017 novella by the same author, Strange Dogs, was filmed at the same time by Eisner.

During a New York Comic Con panel discussion alongside members of the cast, Shankar noted the difficulty of adapting the amount of detail from the sixth book and the novella, which translated to each episode being intense. "You never feel like you’re letting your foot off the gas pedal. By the time you get to the end, it feels cathartic." Franck and Abraham noted that every script was written with "no fat" in it, no extraneous material.

During that same panel, Wes Chatham noted that the addition of Nadine Nichole's character Clarissa Mao serves as a way for Amos to reflect on his own growth as a person. "Amos has always sought out these mentors that he's believed in to make moral choices and give him guidance in life, but he has grown to the point that he's become that to Peaches," Chatham said. "Now that he has someone who's looking to him and leading her in a way, he's starting to think about what their mission is ... and why we are involved in these massive big movements in history."

Craig Elvy of Screenrant noticed that a pattern of using the name of the novels from which each of the season was drawn upon as the title for the last episode of the season. Elvy believes that season 6's investment into the development of the Laconia plotlines will extend beyond the series' conclusion. He notes that the camera's final focus on the Ring, with the distinctive red flashing increasing, seems to confirm "Holden's fear that the alien presence would keep growing stronger"; he further points out that, near the center of the Ring, the outline of Admiral Duarte's protomolecule warship station can be seen.

After Amazon Video has announced that the sixth season would be its last, Polygon writers Petrana Radulovic and Clayton Ashley presumed that since season 5 covered the material in the fifth book Nemesis Games, "it makes sense that the series would conclude ... otherwise, the show would need to cover not only the (seventh through ninth books), but also account to a thirty-year time jump between books six and seven."

Over a year later, fellow Polygon writer Charlie Hall interviewed Authors Daniel Abraham and Ty Franck – who collectively wrote The Expanse novels using the pseudonym James S.A. Corey – preferred to think of the series as "at a very natural pause point" for the story, considering the idea of being canceled as "outmoded".

Director Breck Eisner, who had directed 14 episodes of The Expanse over its six seasons considers the paradigm for the look of the sixth season sets to be a submarine war film. "Before we start, sometimes I go through movies and pull footage of inspirational clips. I did that this year with Das Boot and other sub movies to try and emulate the looks of the lighting and the characters' ragged appearance ... cramped spaces and the idea of this feeling of the walls closing in on you."

To emphasize the aforementioned claustrophobic feel, the set piece the assault team's descent to the Ring Station took place inside of cargo containers; Franck and Shankar describe them as "Porta Potties dropped out of space". The people hidden inside amongst the hundreds of containers heading to the Ring station not being able to see or know what was occurring before the sides of the container break away, which created a WW II paratrooper moment. Speaking to the technical aspects of the scene, Eisner described that they used a motion-controlled camera which tracked Wes Chatham's Amos on a crane as he 'descended'; by moving the crane up and the camera down, they were able to overcome the technical difficulties of the set piece. The resulting tracking shot has Amos suddenly drifting through space, cringing and moving to avoid aerial fire occurring all around him. Eisner praised Chatham's performance, noting "he really sold it."

In his interview with showrunner Naren Shankar, Entertainment Weekly reporter Dalton Ross, Shankar explained that at the beginning of the series, Earth, Mars and the Belt were practically at war with each other. "And all it would take is a spark ... we then provide the spark", referring to the introduction of the mysterious protomolecule. The showrunner points out that the events and conclusion of season six develops and delivers a resolution for that friction. Shankar also points out that, if the viewer watches the end credits very closely, "we even put a little something in there. If you notice, the Ring entities are sort of coming to life at the very end."

"The final shot of the episode, and of the season, and of the franchise, it was written very clearly in the script. The Roci flies off and disappears into the stars. It goes and goes and goes, not rushing, letting it fly away, letting the music swell, and letting it literally disappear into the starfield that we’ve been looking at. It's giving the audience a hint of how vast the expanse of the world is that you’re looking at."

— Breck Eisner, director

=== Easter egg ===
Reviewers were quick to notice a major easter egg within the episode. During the Rocinante's attack on the Ring's rail gun emplacements, the names of several prominent characters from science fiction books, television and film were listed on a video screen depicting the various members of the strike team. Among the names listed were as follows:

Alpha Team:
Gial Ackbar from Star Wars: Return of the Jedi; Douglas Quaid from Total Recall; David Bowman from 2001: A Space Odyssey; Commander Shepard from Mass Effect; Duncan Idaho from Dune; Alex Rogan from The Last Starfighter; Jason Nesmith from Galaxy Quest and Edward Buck from Halo.

Bravo Team:
Shaenon K. Garrity, a sci-fi author and webcomic creator; Ellen Ripley, Dwayne Hicks, Hudson and Vasquez from the Alien films; Joseph Cooper, from Interstellar; John Anderton from Minority Report; Rick Deckard from Blade Runner and Jack O'Neill from Stargate.

Charlie Team:
Lucky Starr, a character from the Isaac Asimov book series of the same name; Louise Banks from Arrival; Kevin Flynn from Tron; Ron (sic) Neary from Close Encounters Of The Third Kind; Johnny Rico from Starship Troopers; Kara Thrace from Battlestar Galactica; Sarah Connor, from the Terminator; Ryan Stone from Gravity and William Riker from Star Trek: The Next Generation.

=== Post-production podcasts ===
The "Expanse Aftershow S6E6" produced by Amazon Studios and hosted by Wes Chatham and Ty Franck discussed the finale at length with Dominique Tipper and Steven Strait, focusing on the development of the characters Holden and Nagata as well as the end of the season (and the series). Chatham recalled a conversation between himself and Strait during season 3 where they had been discussing the shows they had watched when young which had made an impact on them, asking Strait if he felt that The Expanse would serve as that to others. Strait felt that it would, noting that "as an actor, as an artist of any kind, you want to feel that you are part of something important – and we did that."

Strait further noted that his overarching goal during the series to portray the natural and realistic growth as a leader, especially with his character's "messy 'strength through humility,' and a very different kind of masculinity, based on empathy and sensitivity." Strait notes that this culminates in season 6, where his character steps away from a prominent leadership role and "exhibits a very different kind of courage" in knowing his own limitations and not needing to be in control. Strait recalls Daniel (Abraham) summing Holden by saying that "Holden starts the series by rejecting a job out of immaturity, and ends it rejecting it out of maturity."

The actor also noted how he made a point of losing weight so as to reflect that all of the decisions leading up to the final season have worn down Holden terribly. Franck had noted that he, Naren (Shankar), and Daniel agree that Holden is the most difficult character to write for, citing the length of his arc and how gradual his evolution is. He agreed with Strait's interpretation of Holden as a very non-traditional type of hero; whereas the American Western type of hero is "the lone gunman who rides into town, shoots all the bad guys and rides off; Holden's not that guy. He wins by building consensus, by building communities." Franck described how that type of hero is difficult to convey to an American audience, and so had to be guided gradually along to arrive to understand how and why Holden is a heroic figure.

Tipper remarked at how surprised she was that the series had become so specially unique, from its cancellation at Syfy to "the fans saving it " bringing about the renewal at Amazon Prime.

Tipper pointed out that humans – by the end of the show – had finally started to learn from their mistakes of the past and make corrections that, historically, have never been made in the real world. Likening the decision to that of colonizers agreeing that the indigenous peoples should have control over their lands, Tipper reflects that, as a woman of color, found Holden stepping down to provide the Belters with greater control over their future to be "so satisfying".

Chatham and Franck had another in-depth discussion of the "Babylon's Ashes" episode, with Daniel Abraham and Naren Shankar, on their Ty & That Guy podcast.

== Reception ==
"Babylon's Ashes" was met with significant positive response. Michael Ahr from Den of Geek noted that the finale delivered a "satisfying but open-ended conclusion to the series" and argues that the series ended in the only way that it could, with the looming threat represented by Duarte's alien shipyards on the other side of the Ring. Adam Park of CBR considers the final episode to be a bittersweet ending for the fans; he recalls a panel discussion at New York Comic Con 2021, wherein actors Wes Chatham and Steven Strait stated that the final season was "a love letter to the fans ... who allowed us to finish this story.

Writer Craig Elvy of Screenrant points out that the frequent comparisons to HBO's Game of Thrones, as both are adapted from a series of novels and both ended ahead of schedule. Both are epic stories that focus on politics and the exercise of power, but "where the latter is a Tolkien-esque world of magic, dragons and full-frontal nudity, The Expanse chooses space as its arena of choice ... the "sci-fi Game of Thrones" tag isn't entirely undeserved, then, and George R.R. Martin himself is a known fan." That aside, Elvy points out that The Expanse has the opposite problem that Game of Thrones; whereas even the author of the books, George R. R. Martin, felt that the final season was too rushed with many plot points cut short, The Expanse adapted one book per season, and told the story in a reasoned, paced manner.

AIPT Comics' Gary Catig considers the battles and expected tactics from both sides of the conflict make for a first-person perspective that "has the intensity of a video game." Catig considers the quiet scene of the family meal held aboard the Rocinante before the storm of combat "heartwarming, with the survivors of the original crew along side former adversaries turned allies." However, he also expressed frustration at the unresolved protomolecule plotline and the renegade Martians who caused the overarching conflict of the series.

Vanessa Armstrong of /Film calls the finale "satisfying ... but bittersweet," commenting that while the destruction of Marco Inaros is simultaneously anticlimactic and heartbreaking; while the audience is aware that Filip left his father and the ship before its destruction, Nagata believes her son was doomed by her own hand.

Reviewer Melody McCune from Geek Girl Authority noted that one of the things she most enjoyed about the series finale was that while most of the protagonists were in dire peril, they all made it to the end. This offered McCune what she always likes in a series conclusion – "a happy ending." While noting the lack of resolution regarding the threats and concerns still remaining, she points to a conversation between the brooding Holden and Nagata, where the latter "seems to speak to us when she urges Holden to enjoy the peacefulness ... Savor those moments. It's a great life lesson for us all."

Steve Greene from IndieWire noted that for him, the more memorable moments of the episode were not necessarily the battle sequences. He specifically points to two climactic scenes as being more indicative of a show where "diplomacy and interpersonal history played just as big a role as faster-than-light travel or mysterious ... forces." The real moments, Greene opines, are built around communicating. The first "goodbye moment" of the finale occurs in the calm before the storm at the Ring Station where the crew of the Rocinante all enjoy one last meal together as a family.

In another article, Elvy points out that the final credits of the episode conspicuously point out to the viewer that there are unresolved plotlines within the series, such as the fate of Laconia, the meaning of Admiral Duarte's comment about having "gods to kill", and the threat presented by the mysterious, awakening Ring entities. All of this "signposting" setup, Elvy opines, could lead to a season seven or at the least a movie that covers the last three books, later stating that all of that strongly suggests that the "reports of the Rocinante's retirement have been greatly exaggerated".
