= Breck Eisner =

American director

- Born: Michael Breckenridge Eisner; April 26, 1970 (age 56); California, U.S.
- Occupation: Director
- Years active: 1996–present
- Spouse: Georgia Leigh Irwin (m. 2006)
- Parent(s): Jane Breckenridge; Michael Eisner
- Family: Eric Eisner (brother); Stacey Bendet (sister-in-law); Sigmund Eisner (great-great-grandfather)

Michael Breckenridge Eisner (born April 26, 1970) is an American television and film director.

== Early life ==
Eisner was born in California, the son of Jane Breckenridge, a business advisor and computer programmer, and Michael Eisner, the former Walt Disney Company chief executive. To avoid confusion with his father, he uses a short version of his middle name/mother's maiden name as his professional first name. His mother is a Unitarian of Scottish and Swedish descent while his father is Jewish.

Eisner attended Harvard High School (now Harvard-Westlake School), Georgetown University, majoring in both English and Theatre, and the University of Southern California's film school where he received a master's degree in film production.

== Career ==
For a directing project at Georgetown, he filmed a contemporary riff on Alice in Wonderland, shooting scenes in the vast empty attic of Healy Hall on the campus, as well as in an abandoned circular trolley-car tunnel under Dupont Circle in Northwest, Washington, D.C. He also directed Shakespeare plays on the campus.

His MFA thesis film, Recon, a tech noir co-written and co-produced by Steven Cantor, stars Peter Gabriel, Elizabeth Peña and Charles Durning. Set in Los Angeles in 2007, Gabriel plays a weary detective who in order to catch a serial killer uses a new experimental technology, Recon, which allows him to see the last living minutes of the killer's victims through their eyes. Gabriel agreed to appear in the film after having been asked to by Cantor who had served with him on a media advisory board. Peña came on board because she wanted to work with Gabriel while Durning had the same agent as Peña. The film, made for a budget of $21,000, was shot in 1994 but completion took until 1996. It screened at the 53rd Venice International Film Festival, the Edinburgh International Film Festival and the Hamptons International Film Festival, among others.

Eisner had used some of Digital Domain's processors to render images for his film, and the company suggested he meet with some commercial production houses. Thus began his career as a director of commercials, and after only a year-and-a-half, Eisner had directed 14 high-profile spots. His first commercial was Budweiser's Powersurge, which aired during the 1997 Super Bowl. He also took the helm for Rold Gold pretzels' "Comrades" starring Jason Alexander, which featured Pretzel Boy on a rescue mission to the Mir space station. Eisner's two anti-smoking spots for the California Department of Health Services, "Gala Event" and "Funeral", were selected as Best Spots in back-to-back issues of Adweek. In addition, Eisner's "Mad Dog" for Coors's Zima aired during the Seinfeld finale and was chosen by USA Today's "Ad Meter" as the #1 spot. He has also done commercials for Sony, Sega and Coca-Cola.

Eisner's success in the commercial world opened the door for him to direct the TV film The Invisible Man for the Sci Fi Channel. That led to an episode of DreamWorks Television's mini-series Taken (2002), executive-produced by Steven Spielberg and starring Dakota Fanning.

His first full-length effort was the crime drama Thoughtcrimes (2003), which was produced as a backdoor pilot and went straight to video. His theatrical directorial debut was the film Sahara (2005) starring Matthew McConaughey, Penélope Cruz and William H. Macy. The film is considered one of the biggest financial failures in Hollywood history.

Eisner currently works as a director of film and television. In October 2005, it was announced that Eisner would direct a remake of the classic monster film Creature from the Black Lagoon which was dropped in 2009 for unnamed reasons, and in February 2008, it was announced that he would direct The Crazies, a remake of the film of the same name, released in 2010. In December 2009, it was announced he will direct the remakes of Flash Gordon and The Brood, though he later backed out of the latter. He is rumored to direct the remake of Escape from New York. Eisner is set to direct the film adaptation of the Mark Wheatley comic book Blood of the Innocent. In December 2010, he was in talks to direct the film adaption of the Hasbro board game Ouija.

On March 5, 2013, Eisner was set to direct action fantasy film The Last Witch Hunter by Summit Entertainment based on Cory Goodman's script, Melisa Wallack would re-write the script. Vin Diesel stars as lead with Rose Leslie, Julie Engelbrecht, Michael Caine, Elijah Wood and Ólafur Darri Ólafsson.

In April 2014, Sony Pictures Classics announced that Eisner would direct The Karate Kid sequel starring Jaden Smith and Jackie Chan. In June 2014, Eisner left the project because of scheduling conflicts with The Last Witch Hunter, released in 2015.

In November 2024, it was announced that a production company Expanding Universe co-founded by Eisner with Naren Shankar, Daniel Abraham and Ty Franck has a development deal with Amazon MGM Studios, with their first project, television adaptation of The Captive's War trilogy, being directed and co-executive produced by Eisner.

== Personal life ==
In 2006, he married Georgia Leigh Irwin in a ceremony officiated by a Roman Catholic priest and held at her parents' house. Irwin's father is a real estate broker in Palm Springs who developed and sold the resort La Mancha; and her maternal grandfather, Carroll Rosenbloom, was the owner of the Los Angeles Rams and the Baltimore Colts.

== Filmography ==
Short film

| Year | Title | Director | Writer | Note |
|---|---|---|---|---|
| 1996 | Recon | Yes | Yes | Eisner's MFA thesis film for the University of Southern California |

=== Feature film ===
Director

- Sahara (2005)
- The Crazies (2010)
- The Last Witch Hunter (2015)

Executive producer

- A Sound of Thunder (2005)

Actor

| Year | Title | Role | Note |
|---|---|---|---|
| 1999 | The Auteur Theory | Moshe | Segment Brooklyn Will Be Ours |

=== Television ===
| Year | Title | Notes |
|---|---|---|
| 2000 | The Invisible Man | Episode "Pilot" |
| 2001 | Wilder | Unaired pilot |
| 2002 | Taken | Episode "Jacob and Jesse" |
| 2003 | Thoughtcrimes | TV movie |
| 2006 | Beyond | Unaired pilot |
| 2008 | Fear Itself | Episode "The Sacrifice" |
| 2017 | The Brave | Episode "It's All Personal" |
| 2017–2022 | The Expanse | 14 episodes |

== Accolades ==
Eisner has earned Hugo Award nomination for Best Dramatic Presentation in 2020 for directing "Cibola Burn" episode of The Expanse. He got an award in this category for directing this show, in 2022 for "Nemesis Games" and in 2023 for "Babylon's Ashes".
