= Andrew Rotilio =

Canadian actor

- Occupation: Actor
- Years active: 2007–present

Andrew Rotilio is a Canadian film and television actor. He is best known for portraying Diogo Harari, a recurring character in the Syfy and Amazon Prime Video science fiction drama television series The Expanse (2015–2018). He also starred as Luke in the 2015 independent romance drama film The Hotel Dieu, and appeared in the 2023 Netflix comedy drama television series Glamorous, and in the 2024 thriller film Trap.

== Biography ==
Andrew Rotilio grew up in Toronto in Ontario, Canada. His parents immigrated there from Italy. He began his acting career with appearances in several short films, including Happy Days (2012), which won an awards for the best short film at the 48 Go Green film festival. He also appeared in the Investigation Discovery crime documentary television series Cold Blood in 2012. He starred as Luke, the lead character in the 2015 independent romance drama film The Hotel Dieu, for which he was nominated for best actor at the Portsmouth International Film Festival in Portsmouth, England. Rotilio also portrayed Diogo Harari, a recurring character in the Syfy and Amazon Prime Video science fiction drama television series The Expanse (2015–2018). He had minor roles in the 2023 Netflix comedy drama television series Glamorous, and the 2024 thriller film Trap. (Note: Attributed to multiple references:)

== Personal life ==
Andrew Rotilio resides in Toronto in Ontario, Canada. He is fluent in English, French, and Italian.

== Filmography ==
| Year | Title | Role | Notes |
|---|---|---|---|
| 2007 | Binding Borders | Bully #3 | Short film |
| 2012 | Cold Blood | Alex Villanueva | Television series; episode: "Park Slope Justice" |
| 2012 | Happy Days | Logan | Short film |
| 2012 | "Is Anybody Out There?" by K'naan featuring Nelly Furtado | Adam | Music video |
| 2013 | Rats | Kev | Short film |
| 2014 | Inside the Whale | Benji | Short film |
| 2014 | Murder in Paradise | | Television series; episode: "Fear Island" |
| 2014 | Warning Signs | Simon | Short film |
| 2014 | The Wash | Chris | Short film |
| 2015 | Guy on Girl | Server | Short film |
| 2015 | The Hotel Dieu | Luke | Feature film |
| 2015–2018 | The Expanse | Diogo Harari | Television series; recurring character; 16 episodes |
| 2019 | The Next Right | Ryan | Short film |
| 2023 | Glamorous | Marco Mejia's doppelgänger | Television series; episode: "Are You on the List?" |
| 2024 | Trap | Singer | Feature film |

== Accolades ==
Awards and nominations received by Tom Holland
| Award | Year | Category | Nominated work | Result | Ref. |
|---|---|---|---|---|---|
| Portsmouth International Film Festival | 2015 | Best actor | The Hotel Dieu | Nominated | |
