= MindGamers =

- Directed by: Andrew Goth
- Written by: Joanne Reay; Andrew Goth
- Produced by: Walter Köhler; Joanne Reay
- Starring: Tom Payne; Dominique Tipper; Sam Neill; Melia Kreiling; Antonia Campbell-Hughes; Turlough Convery; Oliver Stark; Ryan Doyle; Simon Paisley-Day; Pedja Bjelac; Ursula Strauss
- Cinematography: John Pardue
- Edited by: Thomas Ilg
- Production company: Terra Mater Factual Studios
- Release dates: 4 October 2015 (Grimmfest); 28 March 2017 (United States)
- Running time: 97 minutes
- Country: Austria
- Language: English
- Box office: $43,750

MindGamers is a 2015 Austrian science fiction film directed by Andrew Goth. The film was theatrically released on March 28, 2017 through Terra Mater Factual Studios. The film stars Tom Payne, Dominique Tipper, Sam Neill, Melia Kreiling, Antonia Campbell-Hughes, Turlough Convery and Oliver Stark.

== Plot ==
A group of students attempt to create a wireless neural network of collective consciousness connected through a quantum computer. They discover that motor skills can be transferred through quantum theory and freely spread their technology, which they believe is a step towards intellectual freedom. The group later discovers they are a part of a larger, more sinister experiment.

== Cast ==
- Tom Payne as Jaxon
- Dominique Tipper as Maddie
- Sam Neill as Kreutz
- Melia Kreiling as En.o.ch
- Antonia Campbell-Hughes as Agnes
- Turlough Convery as Rollo
- Oliver Stark as Dylan
- Ryan Doyle as Voltaire
- Simon Paisley-Day as Assessor
- Pedja Bjelac as Mosca
- Ursula Strauss as Da'Silva

== Marketing ==
In October 2016, Terra Mater Factual Studios, a production unit of Red Bull Media House, globally released an online escape room game Mission: Unlock Enoch based on the film. In January 2017, Forbes reported that one thousand movie goers would be able to participate in a live experiment during the release of the film by wearing a cognitive headband to "enable scientists to capture the cognition state of the participants simultaneously via cloud technology and collect data in real time."

== Release ==
The film was screened in U.S. cinemas on March 28, 2017 as a one-night event presented by Terra Mater Films and Fathom Events, during which 1,000 audience members were invited to participate in a neuroscience experiment using cognition headbands.
