= One Ranger =

2023 American action thriller film

- Official release poster
- Directed by: Jesse V. Johnson
- Written by: Jesse V. Johnson
- Produced by: Corey William Large; Bernie Gewissler
- Starring: Thomas Jane; John Malkovich
- Cinematography: Simon Rowling
- Edited by: Matthew Lorentz
- Music by: Sean Murray
- Production company: Renegade Entertainment
- Distributed by: Lionsgate
- Release dates: April 28, 2023 (Dallas); May 5, 2023
- Running time: 95 minutes
- Country: United States
- Language: English
- Box office: $27,938

One Ranger is a 2023 American action thriller film written and directed by Jesse V. Johnson and starring Thomas Jane and John Malkovich.

== Plot ==
Texas Ranger Alex Tyree (Thomas Jane) tracks Declan McBride (Dean Jagger), a bank robber, across the desert — only to discover he's an international terrorist set on detonating a bomb in the heart of London. When the lawman's partner is killed, he is drawn into partnership with British intelligence agent Jennifer Smith (Dominique Tipper) and her boss Geddes (John Malkovich) to bring the outlaw to justice — dead or alive.

== Cast ==
- Thomas Jane as Alex Tyree
- John Malkovich as Geddes
- Dominique Tipper as Agent Jennifer Smith
- Dean S. Jagger as Declan McBride
- Patrick Bergin as Doc

== Release ==
In October 2022, it was announced that the rights to the film were acquired by Lionsgate.

The film premiered at the Dallas International Film Festival on April 28, 2023. Then it was released in selected theaters and on demand on May 5, 2023.

=== Box office ===
As of October 18, 2023, One Ranger grossed $27,938, in Hungary, Czech Republic, Slovakia, and the United Arab Emirates.

== Reception ==
The film has 25% rating on Rotten Tomatoes based on eight reviews.

Dennis Harvey of Variety gave the film a negative review and wrote, "Instead, it's a self-canceling combination of the earnest and the clueless, its technical competency shorn of any leavening style or personality." Matt Zoller Seitz of RogerEbert.com awarded the film two stars.
