= One Thousand Ropes =

2017 film

- Film poster
- Directed by: Tusi Tamasese
- Written by: Tusi Tamasese
- Produced by: Catherine Fitzgerald
- Starring: Uelese Petaia; Frankie Adams; Beulah Koale; Ene Petaia; Anapela Polataivao; Sima Urale
- Cinematography: Leon Narbey
- Edited by: Annie Collins
- Music by: Tim Prebble
- Distributed by: Transmission Films
- Release date: 10 February 2017 (Berlin)
- Running time: 98 minutes
- Country: New Zealand
- Language: Samoan
- Box office: $133,761

One Thousand Ropes is a 2017 New Zealand drama film directed by Tusi Tamasese. It was screened in the Panorama section at the 67th Berlin International Film Festival. It was selected as the New Zealand entry for the Best Foreign Language Film at the 90th Academy Awards, but was not nominated.

== Plot ==
A Samoan father and his daughter reunite and face their past together.

== Cast ==
- Frankie Adams
- Uelese Petaia
- Beulah Koale
- Ene Petaia
- Anapela Polataivao
- Sima Urale
- Nathaniel Lees

== Reception ==
On Rotten Tomatoes, the film has an aggregate score of 100% based on 7 positive critic reviews.

== See also ==
- List of submissions to the 90th Academy Awards for Best Foreign Language Film
- List of New Zealand submissions for the Academy Award for Best Foreign Language Film
