= Frankie Adams =

New Zealand-Samoan actress

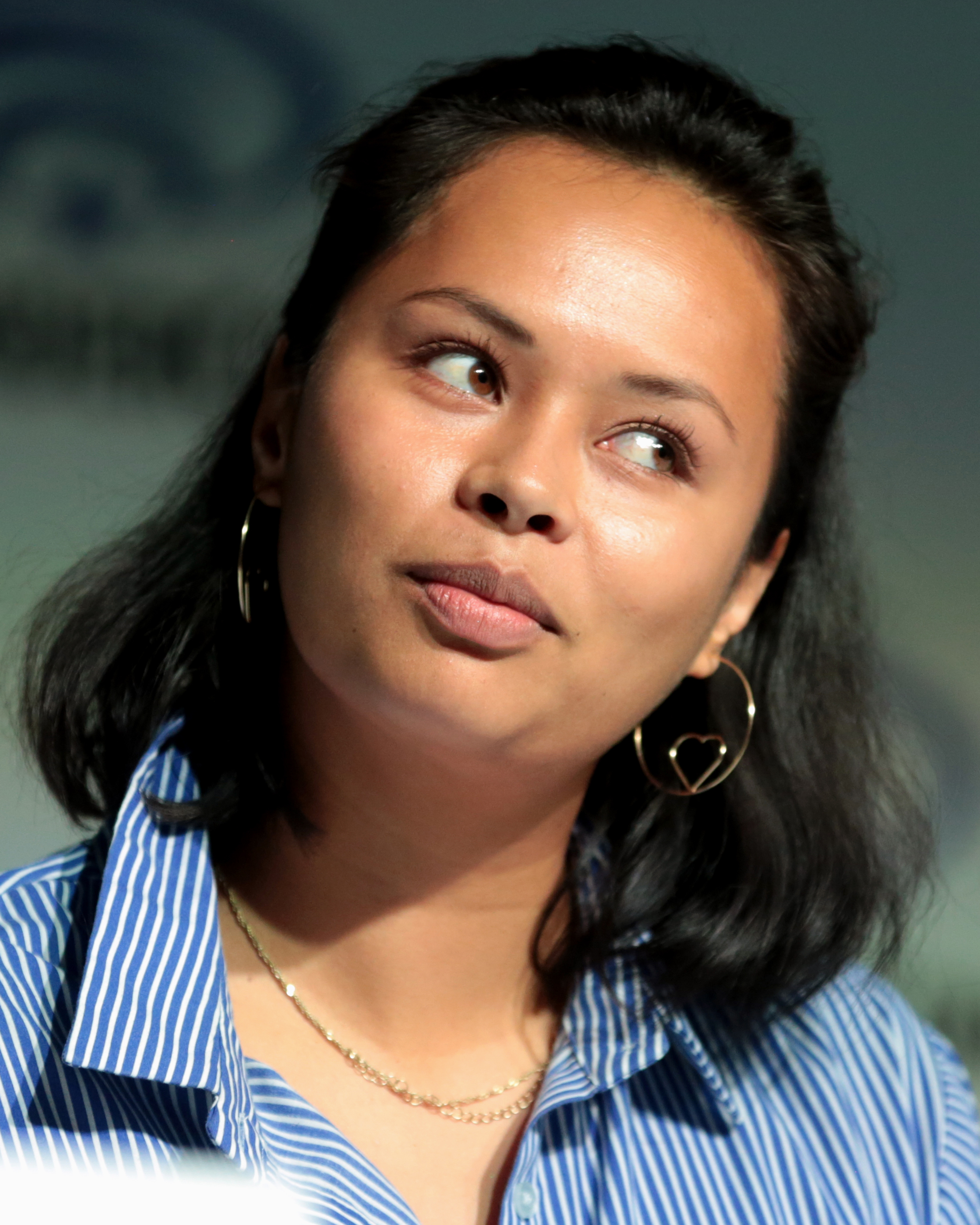
- Frankie Adams at WonderCon 2018
- Born: 3 January 1994 (age 32); Savaiʻi, Samoa
- Citizenship: New Zealand
- Occupation: Actress
- Height: 180 cm (5 ft 11 in)
- Partner: Nick Chrisp (2022–present)

Frankie Adams (born 3 January 1994) is a Samoan New Zealand actress, best known for her roles as Bobbie Draper in the science fiction television series The Expanse and as Ula Levi in the prime-time soap opera Shortland Street.

== Early life and education ==
Adams was born on 3 January 1994 on the island of Savaiʻi in Samoa and is the oldest of three daughters.

She attended Auckland Girls Grammar School.

== Career ==
Adams's first role, aged 16, was that of Ula Levi in the soap opera Shortland Street. She has also had roles in the television series Wentworth and in the film One Thousand Ropes.

In 2016, she was cast as Martian Marine Corps gunnery sergeant Bobbie Draper as part of the main cast in the second season of the U.S. sci-fi television series The Expanse, a role she continued through the sixth and final season.

In June 2024, Adams was named as part of the cast for the live action version of Moana. On 23 August, Adams was named in the cast of the film The Wrecking Crew.

In 2025, Adams was cast as Leilani Tupuola in the first-person shooter video game Call of Duty: Black Ops 7.

== Other ventures ==
=== Celebrity boxing ===
Adams participated in a celebrity Fight for Life charity boxing event, trained by Lolo Heimuli.

== Filmography ==
=== Film ===
Year	Title	Role	Notes
2017	One Thousand Ropes	Ilisa	
2018	Mortal Engines	Yasmina Rashid	
2023	Next Goal Wins	Frangipani	
2026	The Wrecking Crew	Nani	
2026	Moana	Sina	

=== Television ===
Year	Title	Role	Notes
2010–2015	Shortland Street	Ula Levi	278 episodes
2016	Wentworth	Tasha Goodwin	2 episodes
2017–2022	The Expanse	Roberta 'Bobbie' W. Draper	Main cast (seasons 2–6)
2021	The Panthers	Tessa	Miniseries
2023	The Lost Flowers of Alice Hart	Candy Blue	Miniseries

=== Video games ===
Year	Title	Role	Notes
2025	Call of Duty: Black Ops 7	Leilani "50/50" Tupuola	voice
