= Dominique Tipper =

British actress

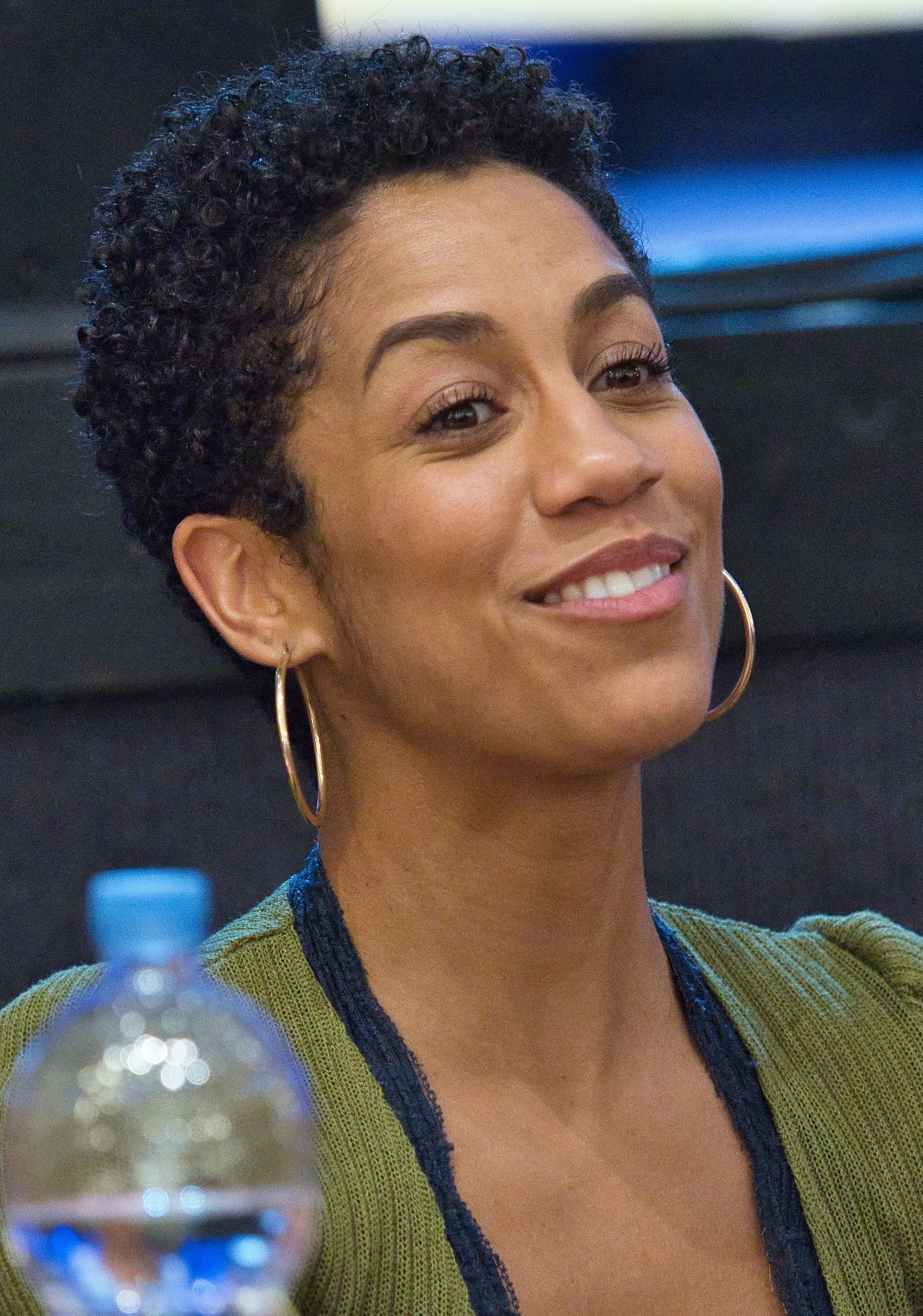
- Tipper at the 2019 FedCon
- Born: Dominique Jade Tipper; Limehouse, London, England
- Other name: Miss Tipper
- Occupation: Actress

Dominique Jade Tipper is a British actress. On television, she rose to prominence through her role as Naomi Nagata in the SyFy/Amazon Prime Video science fiction series The Expanse (2015–2022).

== Early life ==
Tipper was brought up in Limehouse, East London. Her father is from the island of Dominica. As a child, Tipper trained at the O'Farrell Stage and Theatre School and performed in shows at the Hackney Empire.

== Career ==
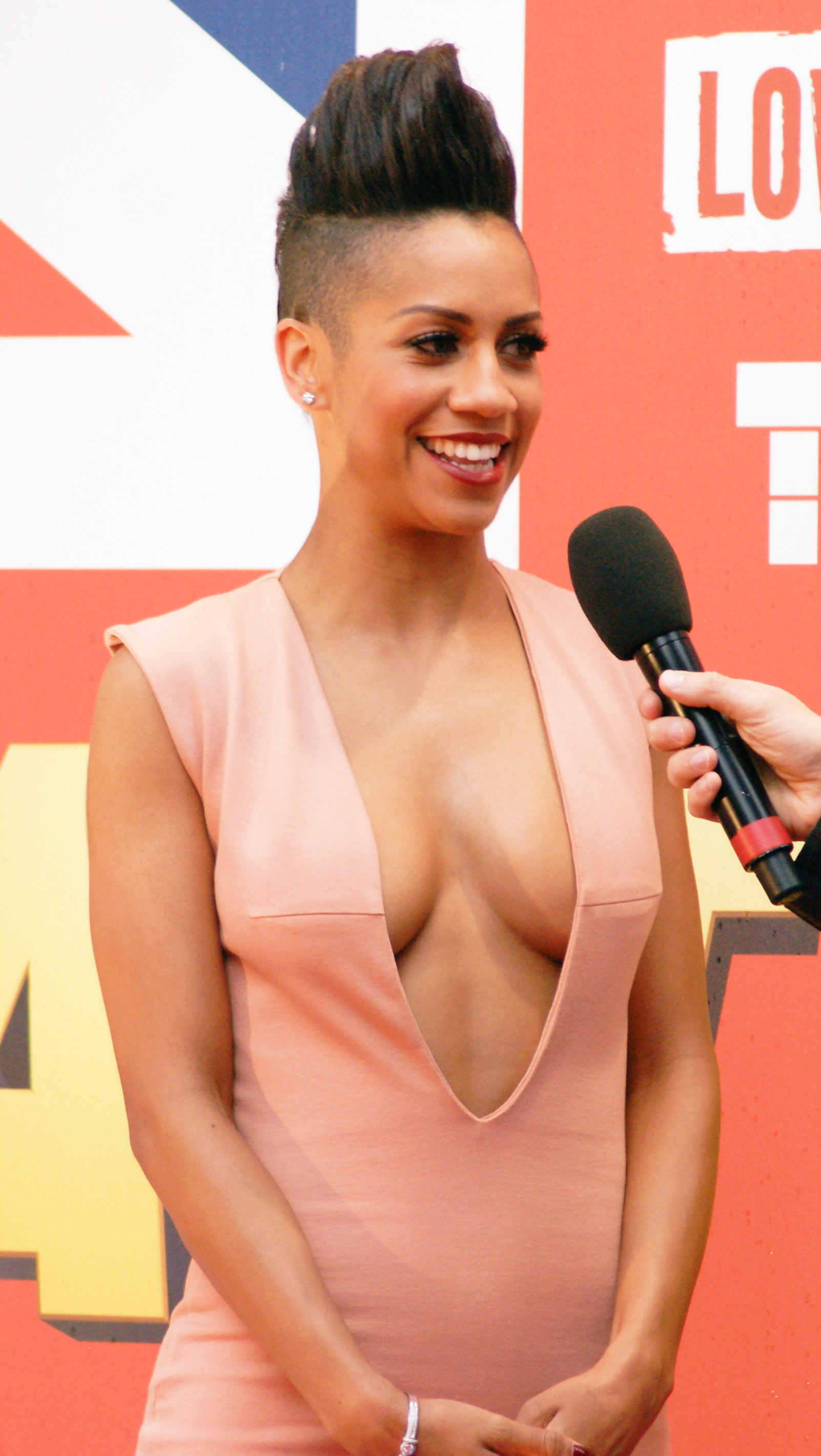
Tipper in 2012

Until 2012, Tipper performed as a commercial dancer with musical groups and artists. As a solo musician, she has published the promotional single Superstar, among others.

Tipper's film roles have included Sarah in the British athletic drama Fast Girls in 2012, Gabriela in the fantasy comedy horror Vampire Academy in 2014 and also Maddie in the Austrian science fiction film MindGamers in 2015. She is best known for her television acting breakthrough in 2015 with her main cast role as Naomi Nagata in the science fiction series The Expanse.

== Filmography ==
Film roles
Year	Title	Role	Notes	Ref(s)
2008	Adulthood	Student 1		
2012	Fast Girls	Sarah		
2014	Vampire Academy	Guardian Gabriela		
2014	Montana	Mohawk		
2015	MindGamers	Maddie		
2016	The Girl with All the Gifts	Devani		
2016	Fantastic Beasts and Where to Find Them	Auror 1		
2020	Monday	Bastian		
2023	One Ranger	Agent Jennifer Smith		
2025	The Man in My Basement	Raelene		

Television roles
Year	Title	Role	Notes	Ref(s)
2015	Death in Paradise	Maz Shipley	Episode: "The Perfect Murder"	
2015–2022	The Expanse	Naomi Nagata	Main role	
2022	Headhunters	Kelly		
2023–2026	Monarch: Legacy of Monsters	Brenda Holland	Guest role	
2024	Testament: The Story of Moses	Zipporah	Netflix Documentary Series	

Video game roles
Year	Title	Role	Notes
2017	Need for Speed Payback	Lina Navarro	Voice acting. The character is also modeled after her appearance.
2021	Biolum	Rachel	Voice acting
2024	Dustborn	Pax	Voice acting
2025	Absolum	High Enchantress Uchawi	Voice acting
