= Keon Alexander =

Canadian actor

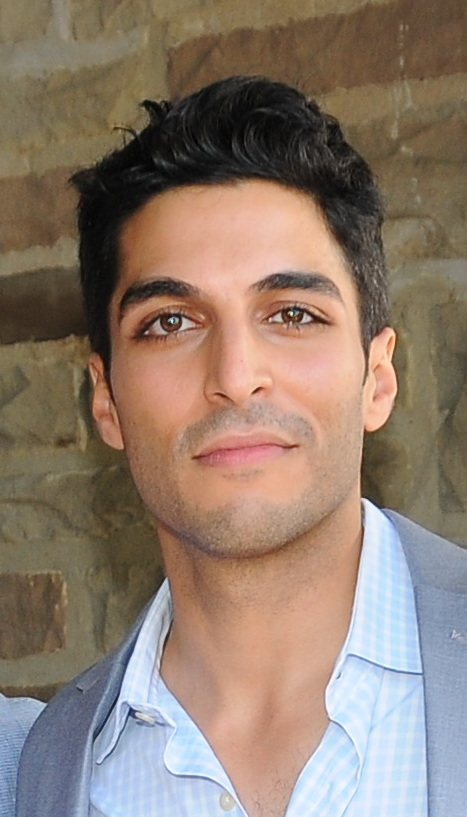
- Alexander in 2011
- Born: Keon Mohajeri; Iran
- Occupation: Actor
- Years active: 2009 – present

Keon Alexander, also known as Keon Mohajeri, is an Iranian-born Canadian actor best known for his television roles as Marco Inaros in The Expanse, Rami Said in Tyrant, Dominick Baptiste in Impulse and as Javad Rahmani in the Netflix series The Night Agent.

== Career ==
Alexander's early roles included a guest appearance in an episode of Flashpoint (2009) and a six-episode stint in the television adaptation of Bloodletting & Miraculous Cures (2010), playing the part of Sri. This was followed by his first film role in Circumstance (2011), which won the Audience Award: Dramatic at the 2011 Sundance Film Festival and was ranked one of the 50 best movies of 2011 by Paste magazine.

Alexander was named one of Canada's Rising Stars by the Toronto International Film Festival in 2011.

Over the next few years, Alexander appeared in many TV series—including Murdoch Mysteries (2012), Republic of Doyle (2012), Legends (2014), and Remedy (2015)—before landing the Recurring Role of Rami Said in FX's Tyrant, in which he appeared in the second and third seasons from 2015 to 2016.

Alexander has had recurring roles as Dominick Baptiste in the television series Impulse (2018) and as Marco Inaros in the science fiction series The Expanse. He became a series regular on The Expanse in Season 5.

Alexander joined the Netflix series The Night Agent as a regular for its second season.

== Personal life ==
Alexander is of Persian heritage.

== Filmography ==
Year	Title	Role	Notes
2009	Flashpoint	John Martens	TV series (1 episode)
2010	Bloodletting & Miraculous Cures	Sri	Mini-series (6 episodes)
2011	Circumstance	Joey	Film
2011	Good Dog	Doctor Williams	TV series (1 episode)
2012	Murdoch Mysteries	Fouad Sharif	TV series (1 episode)
2012	Republic of Doyle	Holden Neely	TV series (1 episode)
2013	The Resurrection of Tony Gitone	Male Hipster	Film
2013	Rewind	Charlie	TV movie
2014	Taxi Brooklyn	Arash	TV series (1 episode)
2014	Legends	Chief Abdel	TV series (1 episode)
2015	Remedy	Jason Kazemi	TV series (3 episodes)
2015–2016	Tyrant	Rami Said	TV series (10 episodes)
2016	Killjoys	Sam Romwell	TV series (1 episode)
2016	Eugenia and John	Carlos	Film
2016	Pure Genius	Bashir Masood	TV series (1 episode)
2018	Impulse	Dominick Baptiste	TV series (5 episodes)
2018	NCIS	Nazy Rickman	TV series (1 episode)
2019	A Simple Wedding	Kamran	Film
2019–2022	The Expanse	Marco Inaros	TV series (18 episodes)
2024	Quantum Leap 2022	Ricardo Baragan	TV series (1 episode)
2025	The Night Agent	Javad	TV series (10 episodes)
2025	Merry Little Mystery	Adrian Langley	Film
