= The Expanse (TV series) =

American science fiction television series (2015–2022)

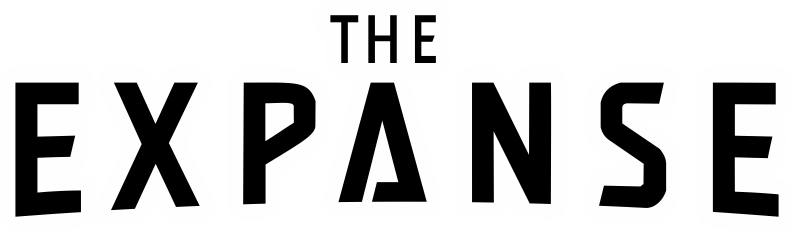
- Genre: Science fiction; Drama
- Based on: The Expanse by James S. A. Corey
- Developed by: Mark Fergus; Hawk Ostby
- Showrunners: Mark Fergus; Hawk Ostby; Naren Shankar
- Starring: Thomas Jane; Steven Strait; Cas Anvar; Dominique Tipper; Wes Chatham; Paulo Costanzo; Florence Faivre; Shawn Doyle; Shohreh Aghdashloo; Frankie Adams; Cara Gee; Keon Alexander; Jasai Chase Owens; Nadine Nicole
- Composer: Clinton Shorter
- Country of origin: United States
- Original language: English
- No. of seasons: 6
- No. of episodes: 62 (list of episodes)

Production
- Executive producers: Naren Shankar; Mark Fergus; Hawk Ostby; Sean Daniel; Jason F. Brown; Sharon Hall; Broderick Johnson; Andrew Kosove; Laura Lancaster; Daniel Abraham; Ty Franck; Dan Nowak; Ben Roberts
- Producers: Lynn Raynor; Jason Ning; Robin Veith; Ben Cook; Manny Danelon; Alan Di Fiore; Lewin Webb; Robert Munroe; Steven Strait; Shohreh Aghdashloo; Wes Chatham; Dominique Tipper
- Production locations: Toronto, Ontario, Canada
- Cinematography: Jeremy Benning; Michael Galbraith; Ray Dumas
- Running time: 42–63 minutes
- Production companies: Penguin in a Parka; SeanDanielCo (s. 1–3); Alcon Television Group; Just So (s. 4–6); Hivemind (s. 4–6); Amazon Studios (s. 4–6)

Original release
- Network: Syfy
- Release: December 14, 2015 – June 27, 2018
- Network: Amazon Prime Video
- Release: December 12, 2019 – January 14, 2022

The Expanse is an American science fiction television series developed by Mark Fergus and Hawk Ostby for the Syfy network; it is based on the series of novels of the same name by James S. A. Corey. Set in a future where humanity has colonized the Solar System, it follows a disparate band of protagonists – United Nations Security Council member Chrisjen Avasarala (Shohreh Aghdashloo), cynical detective Josephus Miller (Thomas Jane), and ship's officer James Holden (Steven Strait) and his crew – as they unwittingly unravel and place themselves at the center of a conspiracy that threatens the system's fragile peace, while dealing with existential crises brought forth by newly discovered alien technology.

It received positive critical response, with particular praise for its visuals, character development and political narrative. It received three Hugo Awards for Best Dramatic Presentation out of six nominations, and three Saturn Award nominations for Best Science Fiction Television Series. Syfy cancelled the series after three seasons. Amazon later acquired the series, producing three more seasons, with the series concluding with its sixth. The series premiered on December 14, 2015 on Syfy, with the series finale being released on Amazon on January 14, 2022.

== Series overview ==
Season	Episodes	Originally released		
Season	Episodes	First released	Last released	Network
1	10	December 14, 2015	February 2, 2016	Syfy
2	13	February 1, 2017	April 19, 2017	Syfy
3	13	April 11, 2018	June 27, 2018	Syfy
4	10	December 12, 2019		Amazon Prime Video
5	10	December 15, 2020	February 2, 2021	Amazon Prime Video
6	6	December 10, 2021	January 14, 2022	Amazon Prime Video

=== Setting ===
Hundreds of years in the future, humanity has colonized the Solar System. The three largest powers are the United Nations of Earth and Luna, the Martian Congressional Republic on Mars, and the Outer Planets Alliance (OPA), a loose political confederation of colonies scattered across the asteroid belt and the moons of Jupiter and Saturn. The United Nations is a capitalist society with authoritarian undertones, while the Martians have evolved into a militaristic, corporatist culture. Both ruthlessly exploit and oppress the "Belter" populations of the OPA to gain control of their valuable natural resources.

=== Season 1 ===
UN Deputy Undersecretary Chrisjen Avasarala works to prevent simmering tensions between the United Nations and Mars from erupting into all-out war. Ceres police investigator Josephus "Joe" Miller is tasked with finding a missing young woman, Julie Mao, who has ties to the OPA. The Canterbury, an industrial ice-harvesting ship, and the Martian Navy flagship Donnager are destroyed by unknown stealth ships. James Holden, Naomi Nagata, Alex Kamal, and Amos Burton survive both attacks and escape in the Tachi, a Martian gunship. They rename the ship Rocinante, which becomes the main setting of the series. The crew of the Rocinante, with Miller's help, investigate and eventually discover a biohazard that kills off most of the humans on the asteroid spaceport Eros, including Julie. Chrisjen sends her family away after realizing that a faction within the UN is responsible for the demise of both ships.

=== Season 2 ===
The crew of the Rocinante, along with members of the OPA, attack the station responsible for the biohazard on Eros. Learning that it is an extra-solar bio-weapon known as the protomolecule, they attempt to destroy Eros. Miller becomes trapped there and dies when it crashes into Venus. Martian Marine Bobbie Draper fights an inhuman figure on Ganymede and later, during peace talks between Earth and Mars, becomes a protégé of Avasarala. The crew tries to help a father, Prax, find his daughter. In the process, they encounter and kill a figure akin to the one that Draper fought, now known as a "protomolecule hybrid", developed by Jules-Pierre Mao. A research ship, sent to Venus to investigate the crash of Eros into the planet, is stopped dead in the atmosphere and dismantled by the protomolecule.

=== Season 3 ===
The UN declares war, as Earth and Mars send science vessels to investigate what is happening on Venus. Political tensions soar as the OPA is recognized as the government of the Belters and Prax is reunited with his daughter. The protomolecule forms the Ring, a structure which takes an orbital position beyond Uranus, and all three governments race to send their ships through. After a Belter racing ship slingshots through the Ring at high speed, the ring believes the high speed humans and objects to be dangerous and activates defenses that threaten humanity. Through Holden, a projection of Miller dubbed the Investigator tries to shut off the defenses of the ring and convince the protomolecule that humanity is not a threat. The ring reveals itself to be a massive network of wormholes to other planetary systems, each containing a habitable earth-like planet.

=== Season 4 ===
With hundreds of habitable star systems accessible via the Ring's wormholes, the balance of the Solar System is disrupted forever. Earthers begin demanding an organized exodus to solve the planet's overcrowding, while efforts to terraform Mars grind to a halt with the realization that naturally habitable worlds are available. Drummer reorganizes much of the OPA to become the custodians of "ringspace" so that colonization and communication can be controlled and stable. A ship runs Drummer's blockade, and Avasarala sends the Rocinante to investigate the situation on the exoplanet, called Ilus. While the rest of the crew try to ease tension between the colonists and an officially backed scientific expedition with private military support, Holden discovers ruins from the same civilization that built the Rings. With the help of the Investigator, Holden reactivates an ancient structure, setting off a chain of cataclysmic events.

=== Season 5 ===
A deadly conspiracy threatens Earth, as the crew of the Rocinante pursue personal missions while their ship is in dry dock at Tycho Station. Draper and Avasarala investigate the Martian military's ties to a growing threat from a rogue faction of Belters. Marco Inaros, the rebel leader, assembles a Belter fleet and attacks Earth with stealth-shielded asteroids.

=== Season 6 ===
Holden and the crew of the Rocinante fight alongside the Combined Fleet of Earth and Mars to protect the Inner Planets from Marco Inaros and his Free Navy. The combined fleet, allied with the ships of Camina Drummer and other Belter forces, defeats Marco and the Free Navy by antagonizing an unknown alien presence. On a distant planet, a young colonist discovers animals that can resurrect her dead sibling.

== Cast and characters ==
Character	Portrayed by	Appearances					
Character	Portrayed by	Season 1	Season 2	Season 3	Season 4	Season 5	Season 6
Joe Miller	Thomas Jane	Main	Main	Special appearances	Special appearances		
James Holden	Steven Strait	Main	Main	Main	Main	Main	Main
Alex Kamal	Cas Anvar	Main	Main	Main	Main	Main	
Naomi Nagata	Dominique Tipper	Main	Main	Main	Main	Main	Main
Amos Burton	Wes Chatham	Main	Main	Main	Main	Main	Main
Shed Garvey	Paulo Costanzo	Main					
Juliette Mao	Florence Faivre	Main	Main	Special appearance			
Sadavir Errinwright	Shawn Doyle	Main	Main	Main			
Chrisjen Avasarala	Shohreh Aghdashloo	Main	Main	Main	Main	Main	Main
Bobbie Draper	Frankie Adams		Main	Main	Main	Main	Main
Camina Drummer	Cara Gee		Recurring	Recurring	Main	Main	Main
Marco Inaros	Keon Alexander				Recurring	Main	Main
Filip Inaros	Jasai Chase-Owens				Guest	Main	Main
Clarissa Mao	Nadine Nicole			Recurring	Guest	Main	Main

=== Main ===
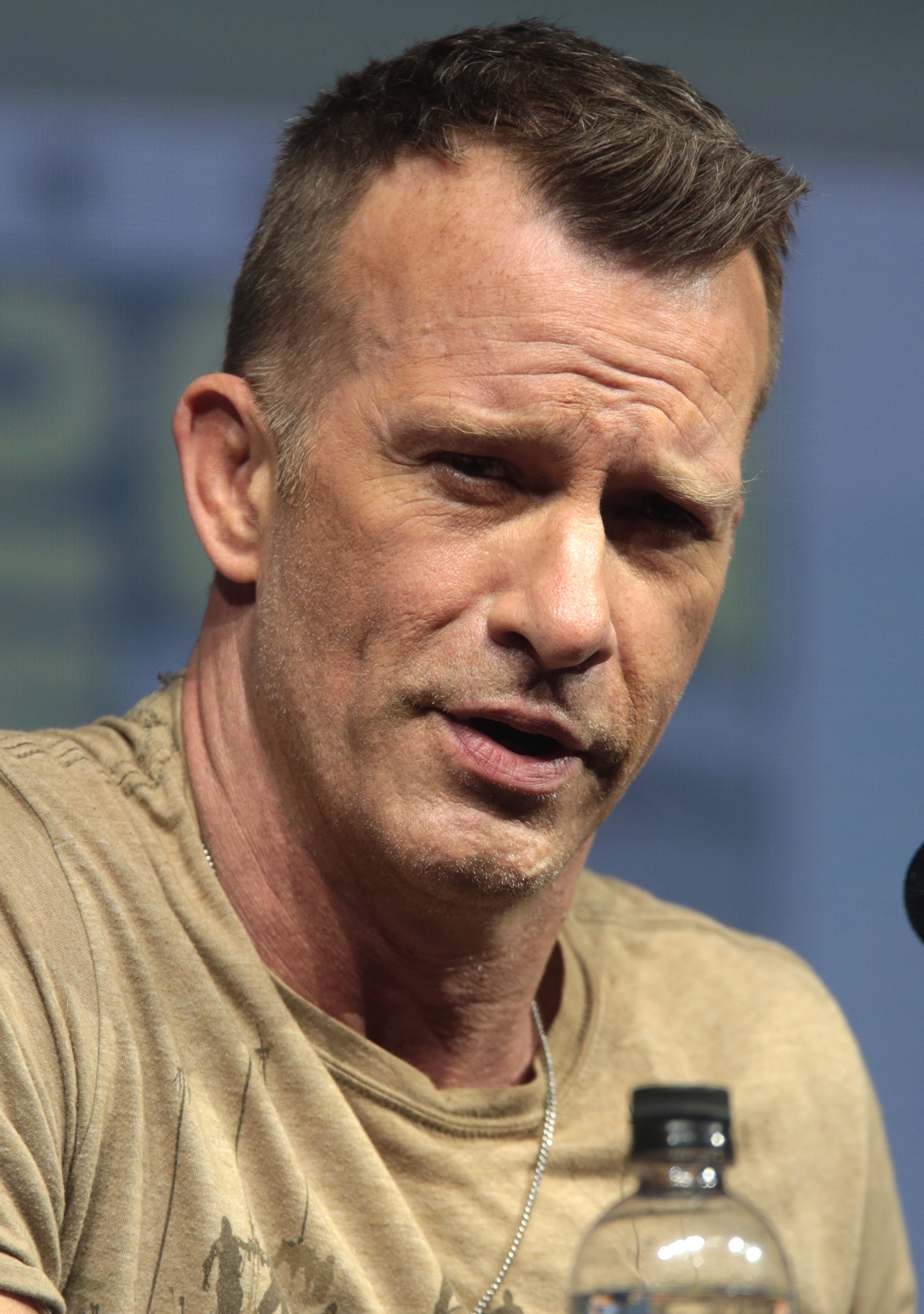
Thomas Jane

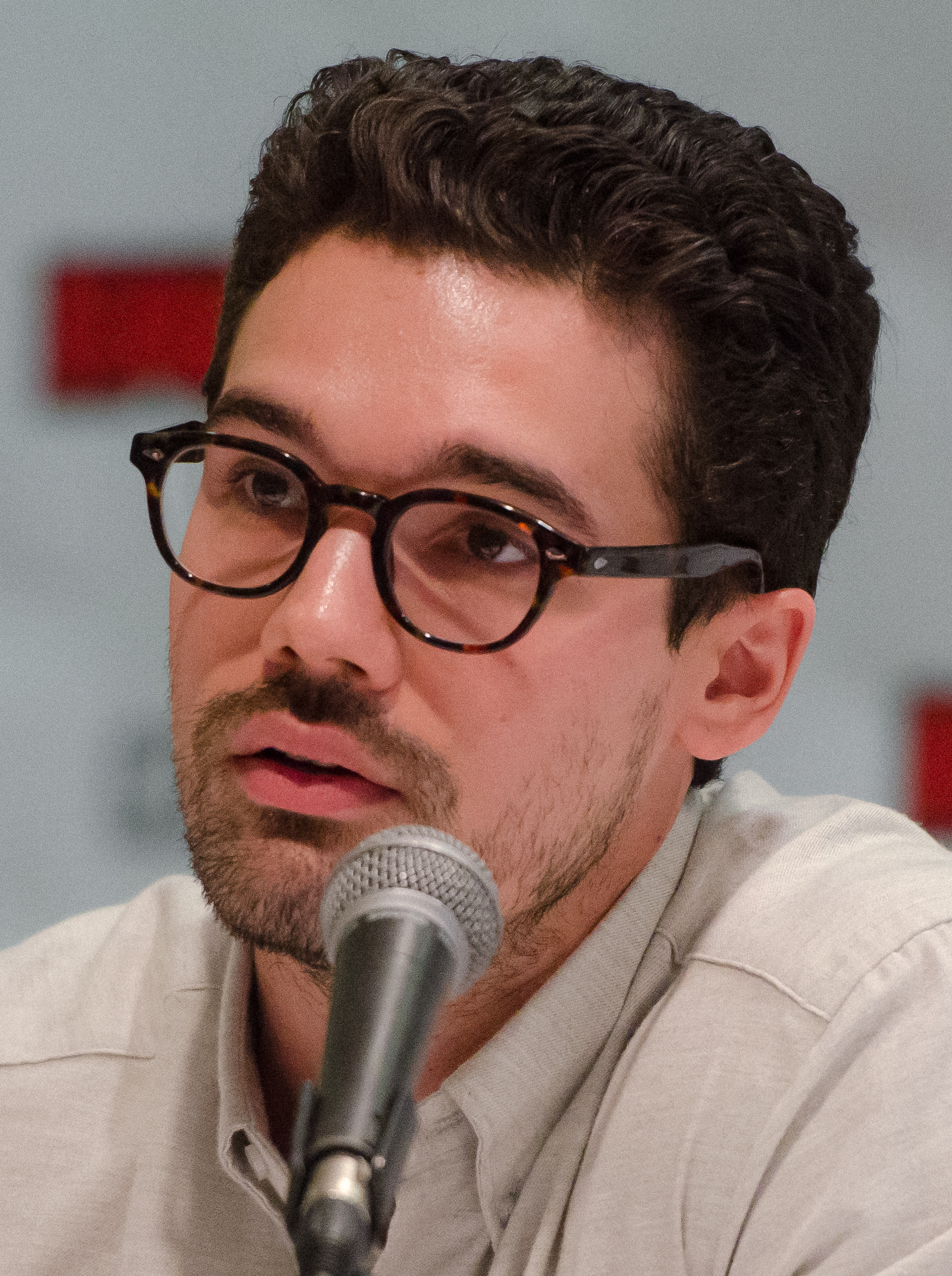
Steven Strait

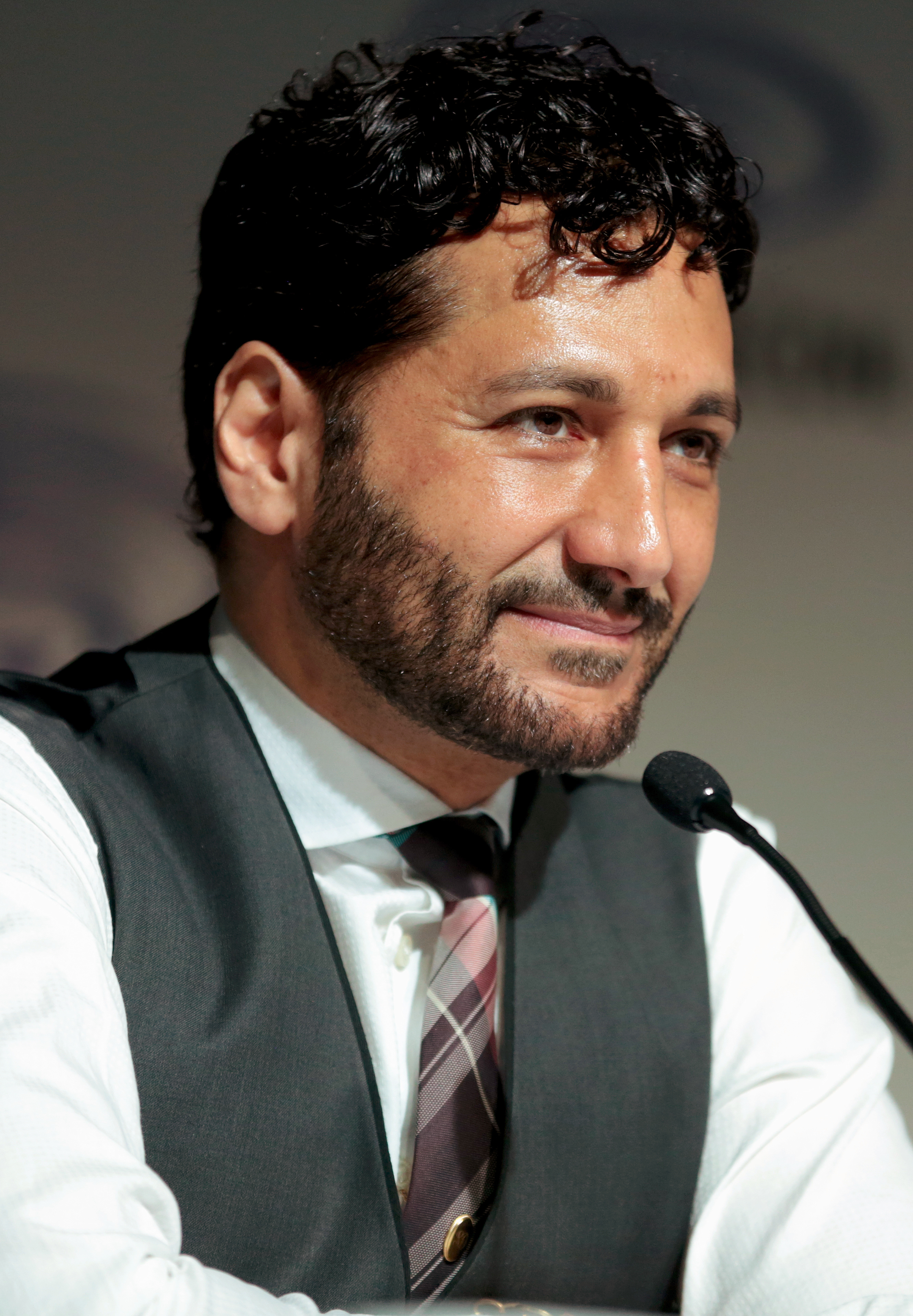
Cas Anvar

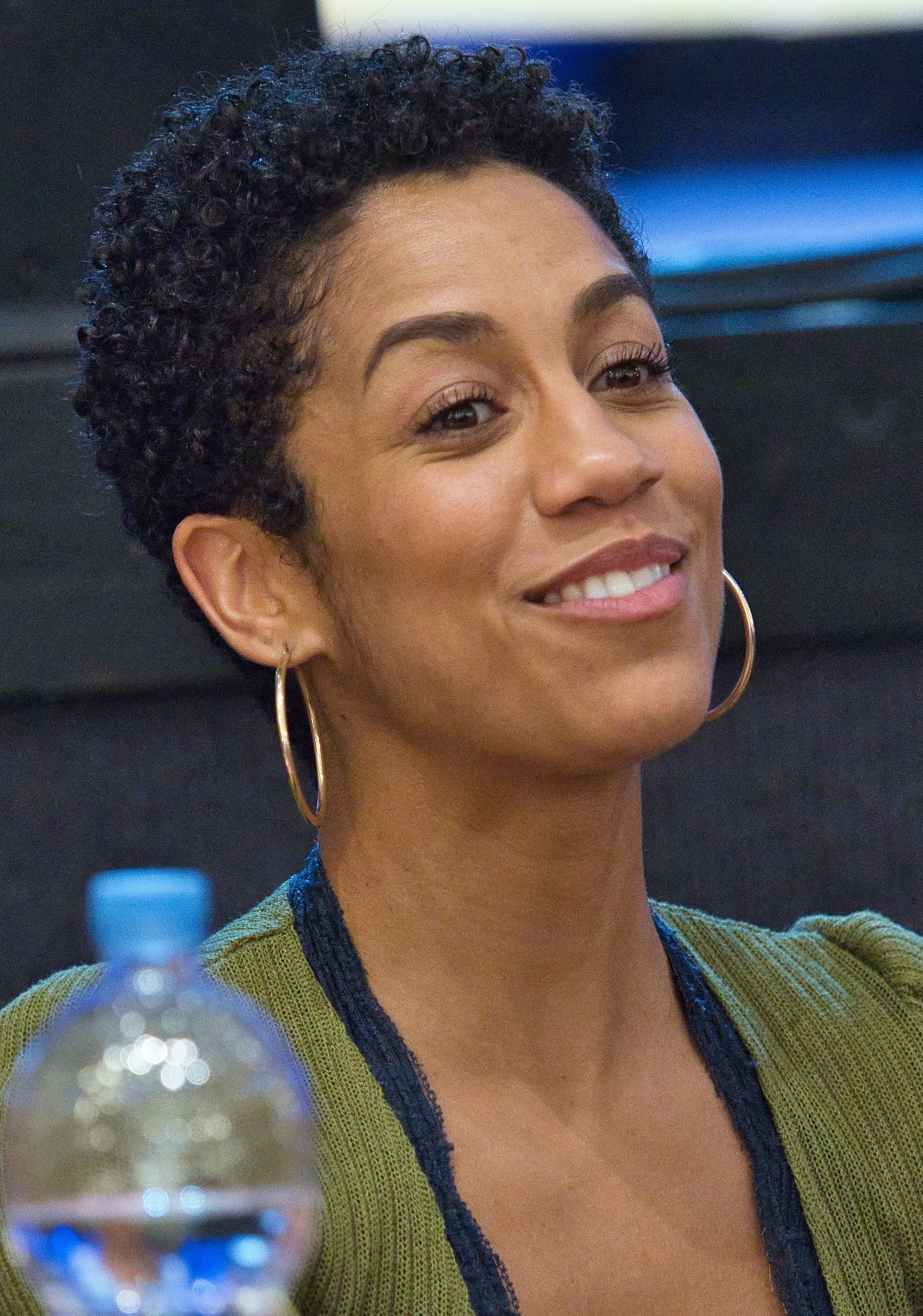
Dominique Tipper

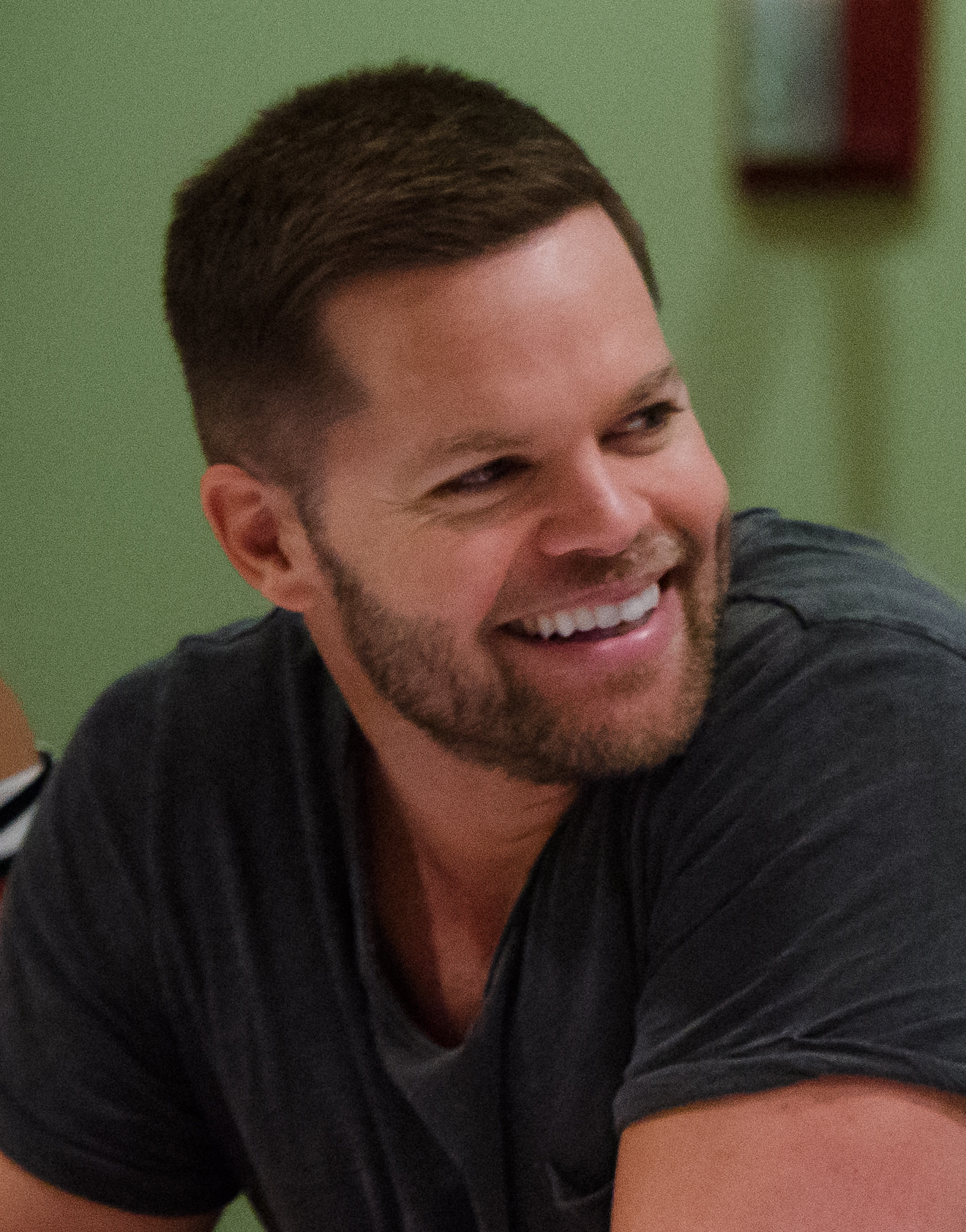
Wes Chatham

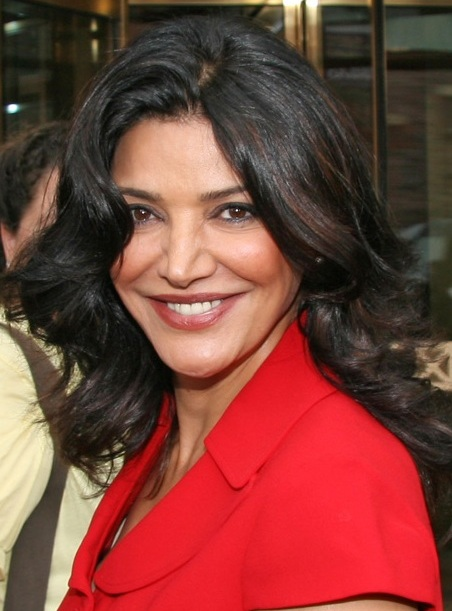
Shohreh Aghdashloo

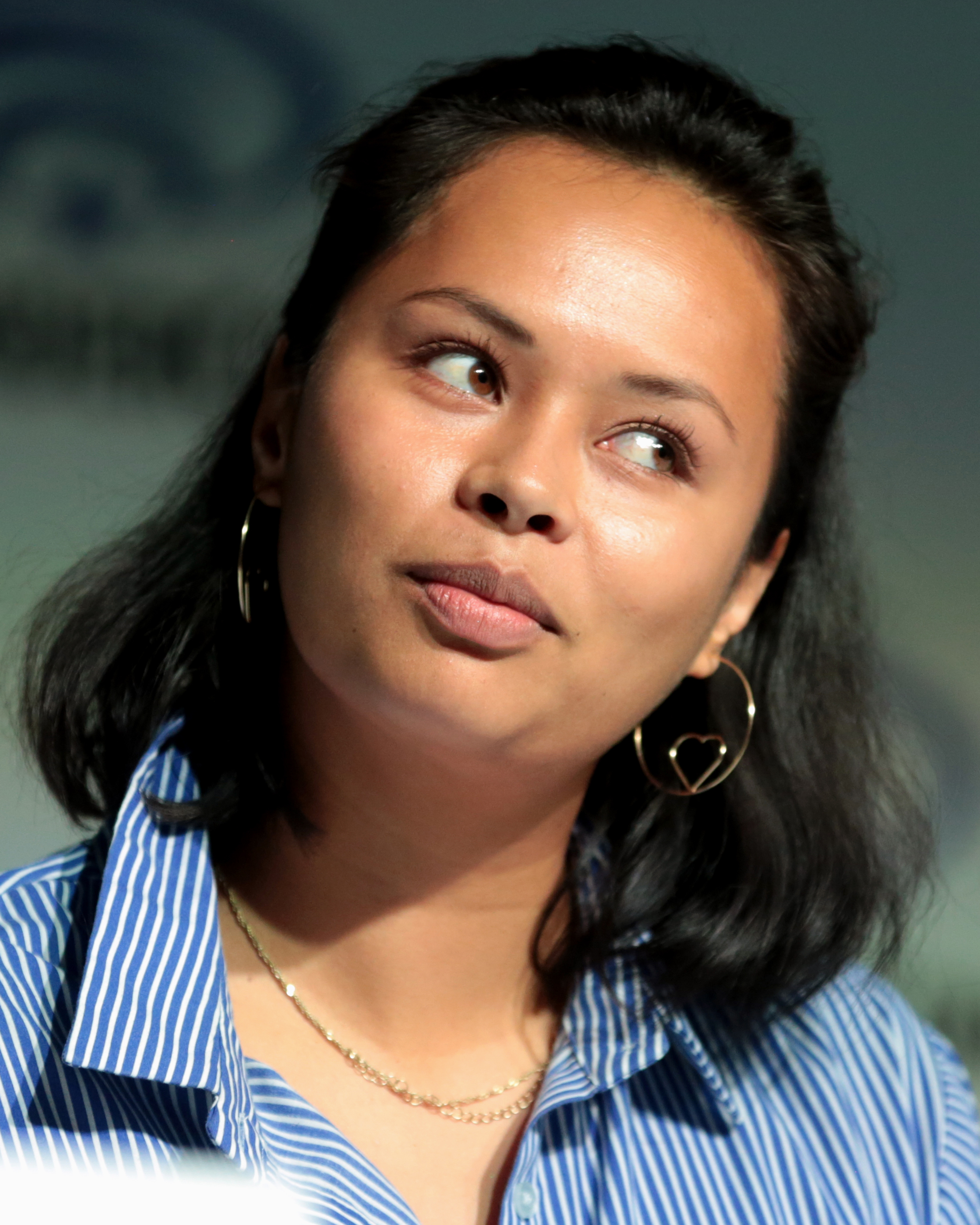
Frankie Adams

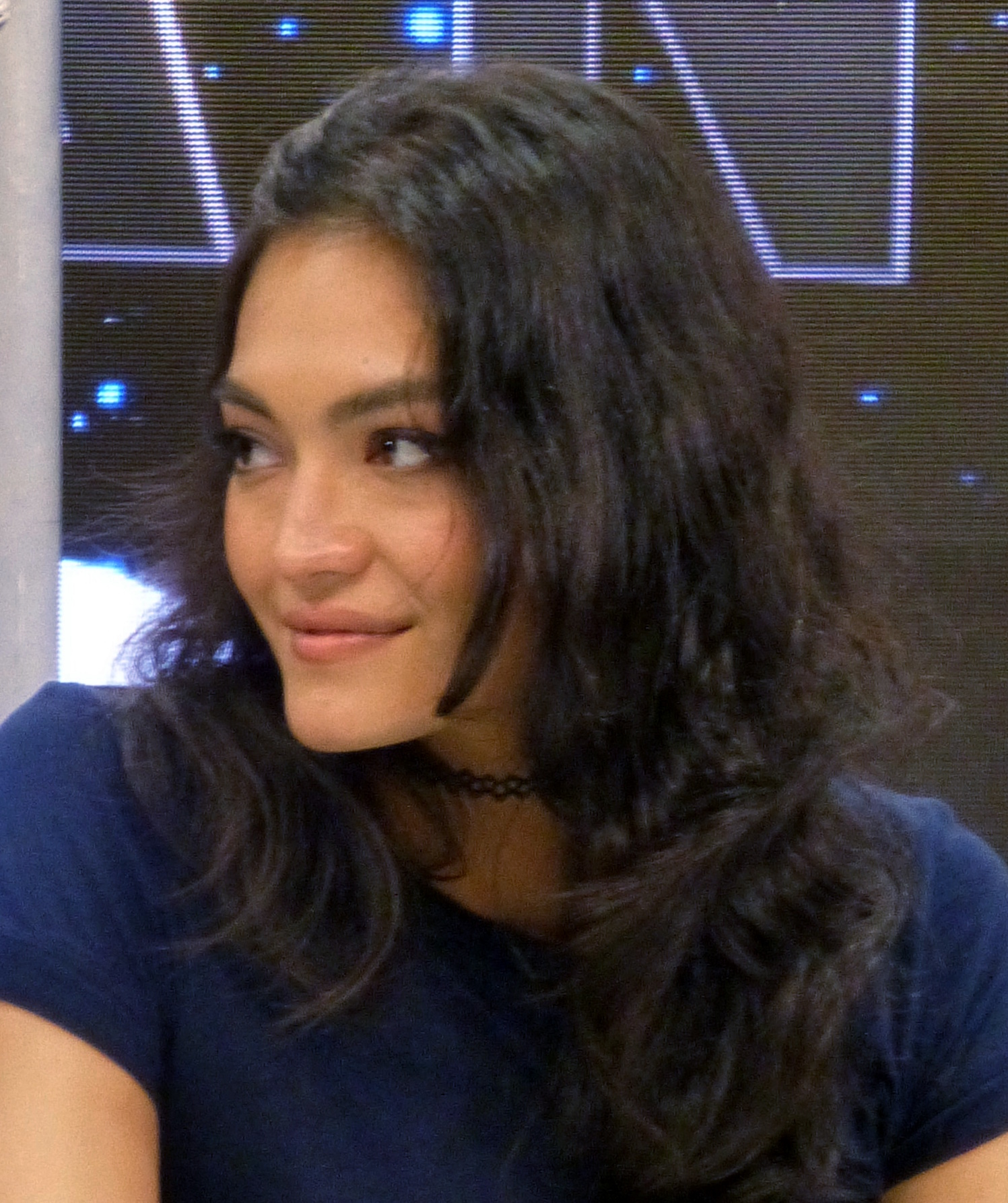
Florence Faivre

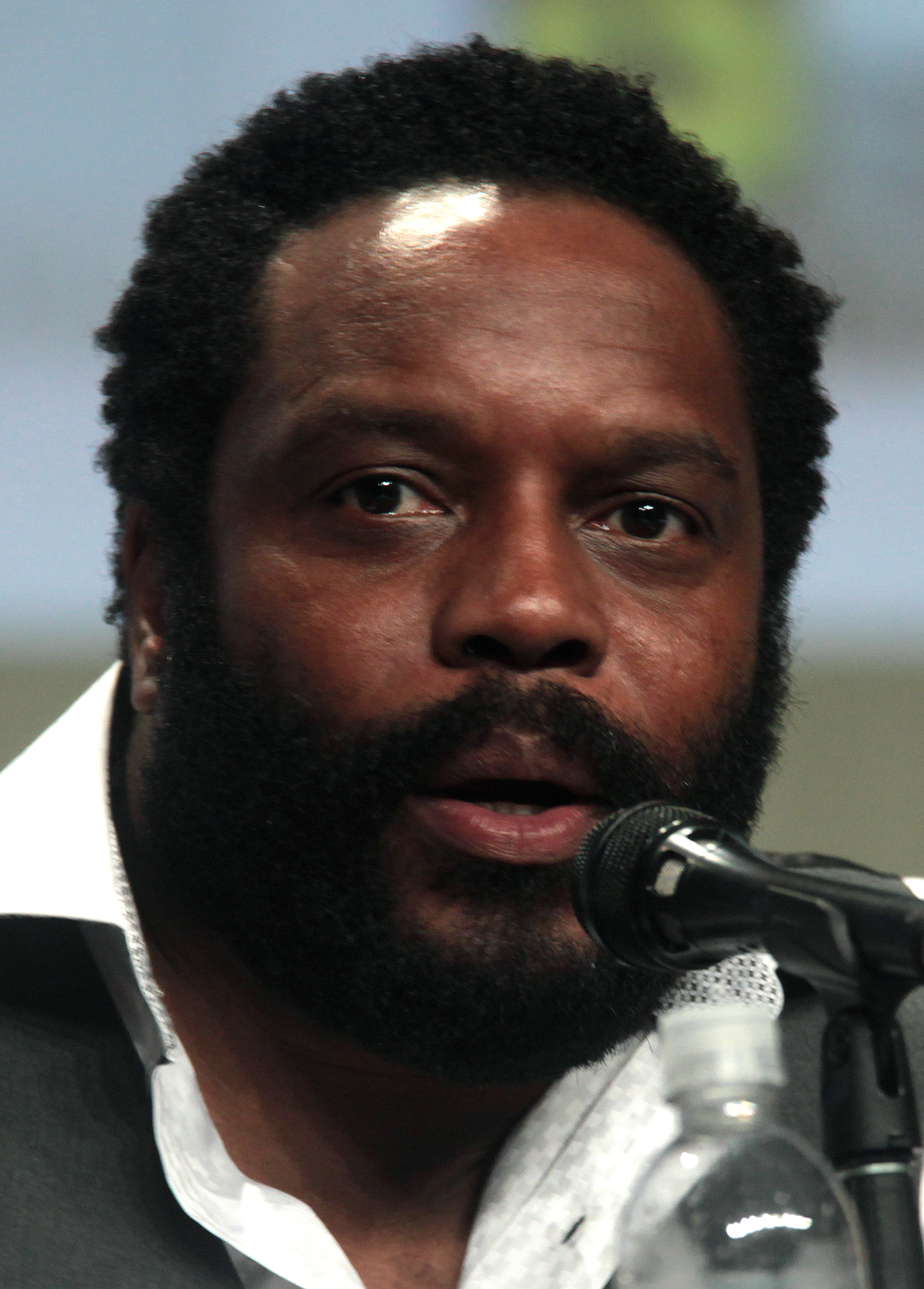
Chad L. Coleman

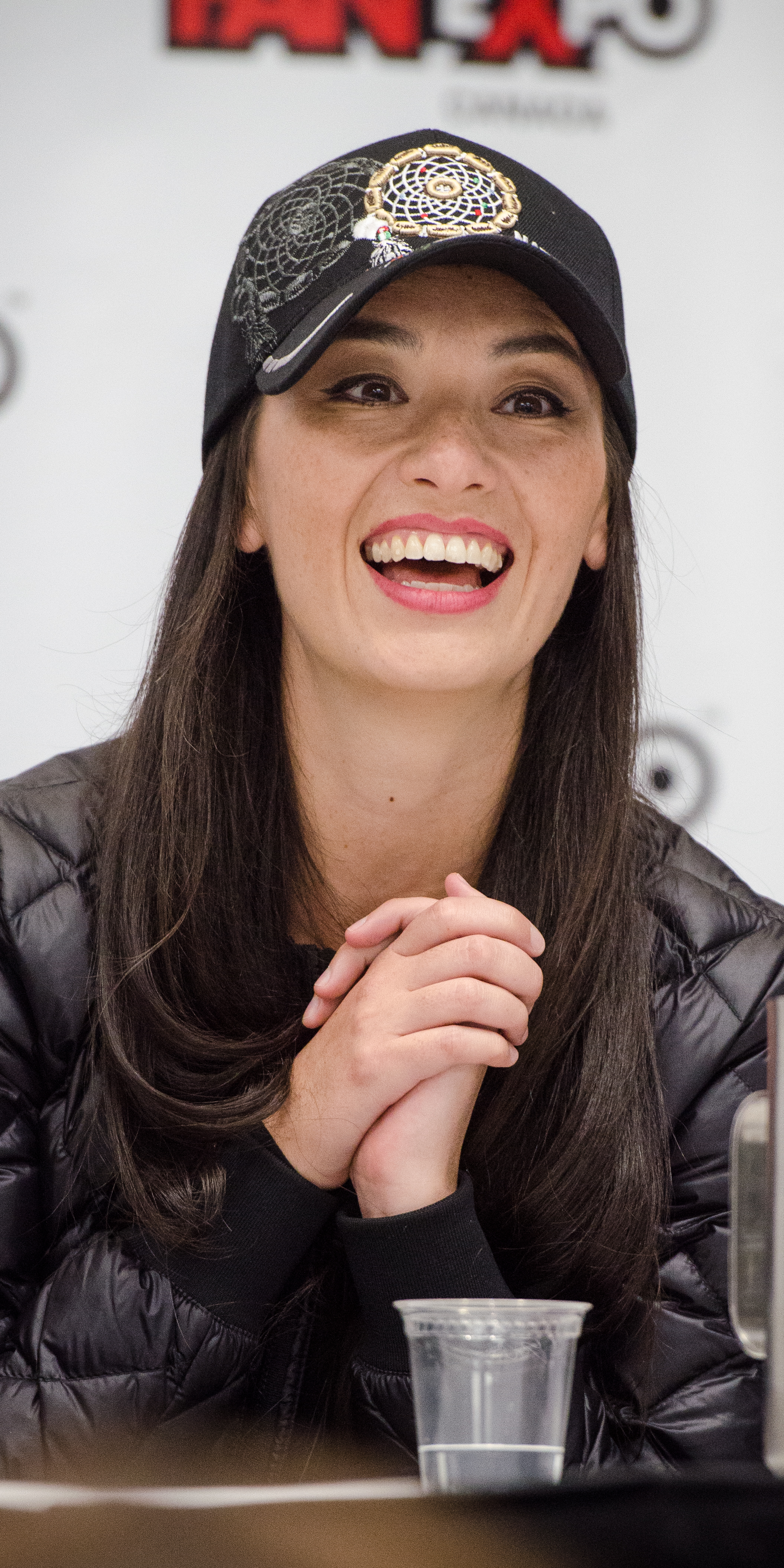
Cara Gee

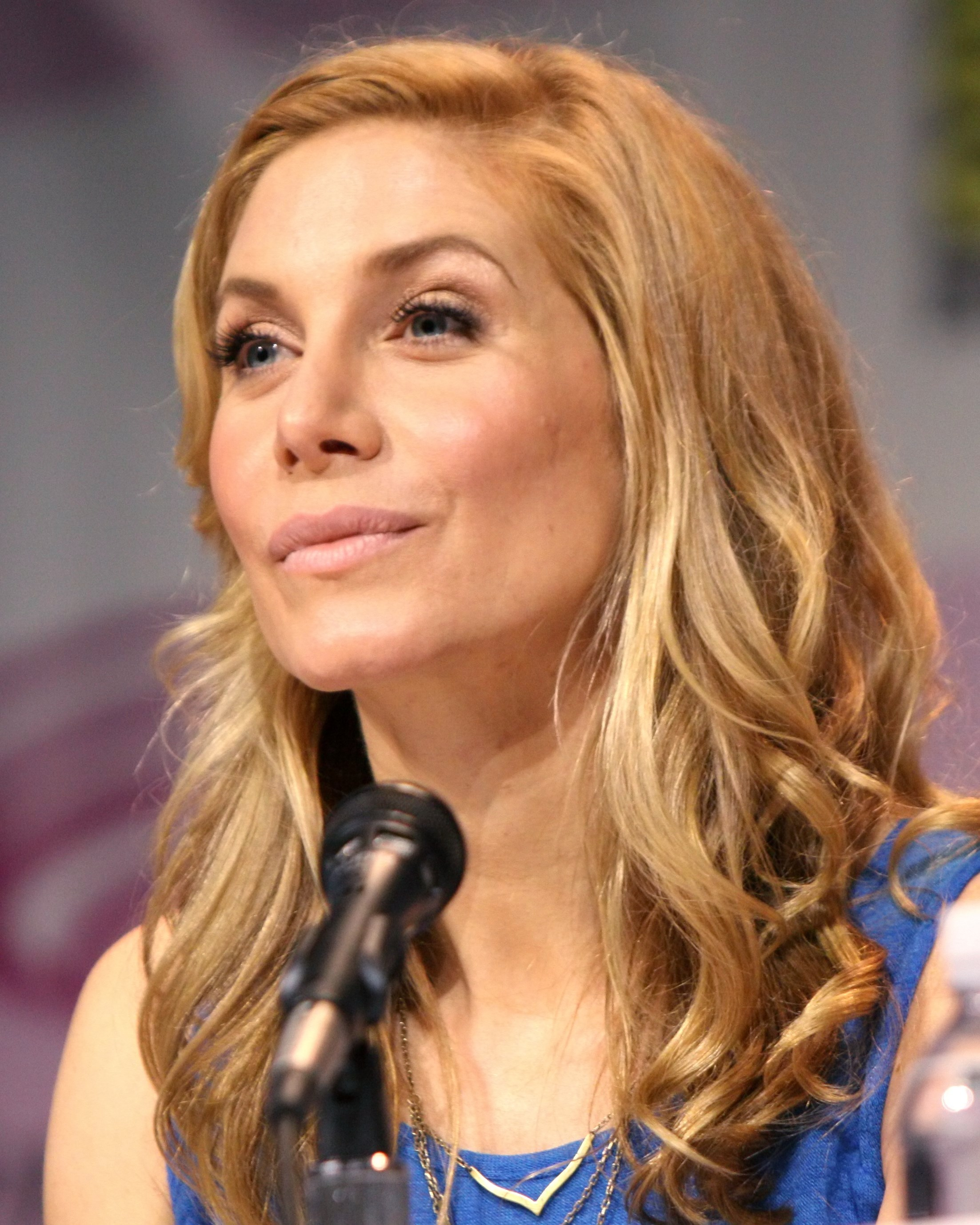
Elizabeth Mitchell

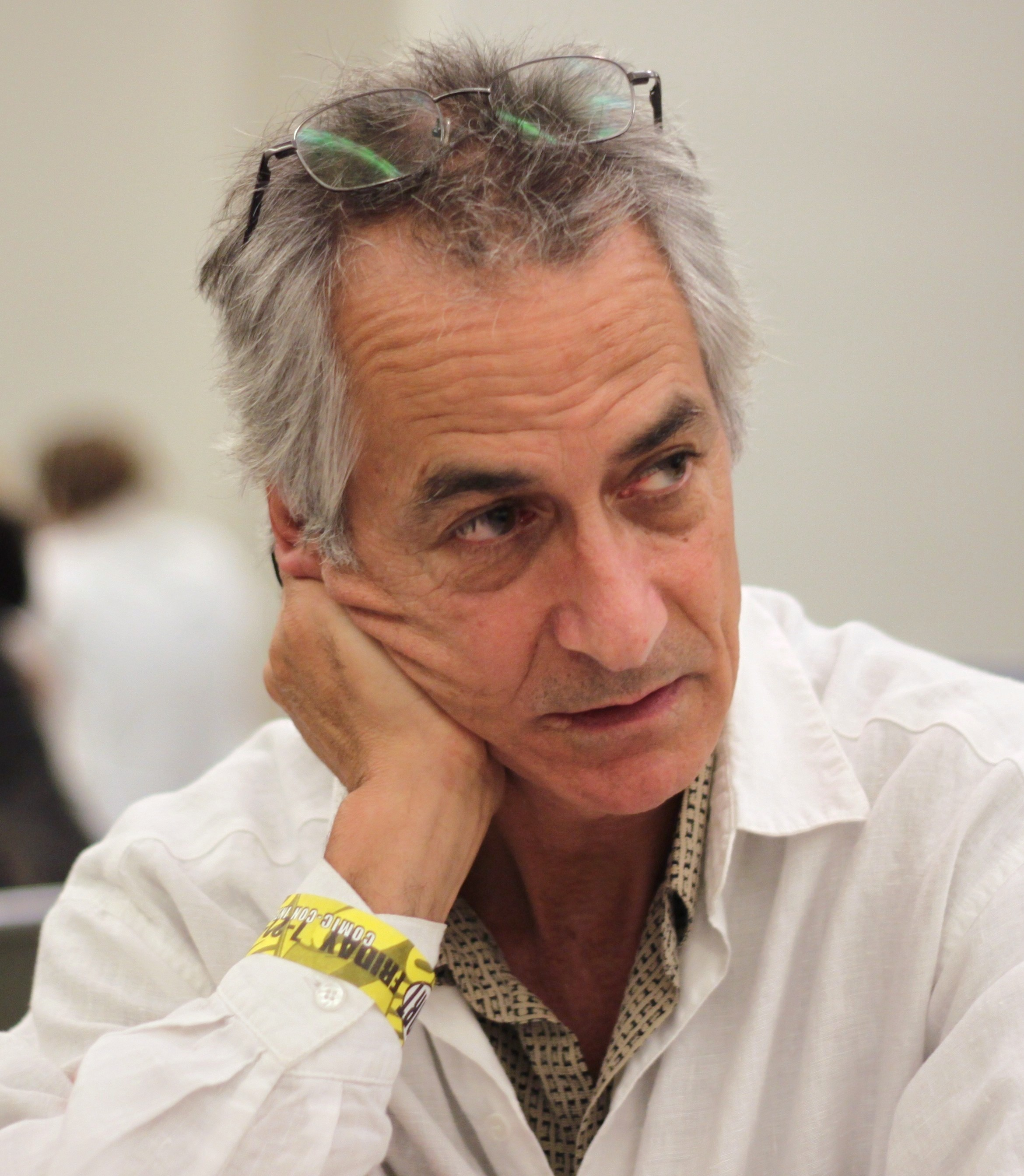
David Strathairn

- Thomas Jane as Joe Miller/The Investigator (seasons 1–2; special appearances seasons 3–4), a Belter detective on Ceres assigned to find Julie Mao
- Steven Strait as James Holden, the Earther executive officer on the Canterbury, later the captain of the Rocinante
- Cas Anvar as Alex Kamal (seasons 1–5), the Martian pilot of the Canterbury, later the pilot of the Rocinante
- Dominique Tipper as Naomi Nagata, a Belter engineer of the Canterbury, later the engineer of the Rocinante
- Wes Chatham as Amos Burton, an Earther mechanic of the Canterbury, originally from Baltimore; later the mechanic of the Rocinante
- Paulo Costanzo as Shed Garvey (season 1), the Canterbury's medical technician
- Florence Faivre as Juliette "Julie" Andromeda Mao (seasons 1–2; special appearance season 3), the missing daughter of business tycoon Jules-Pierre Mao
- Shawn Doyle as Sadavir Errinwright (seasons 1–3), UN Undersecretary of Executive Administration
- Shohreh Aghdashloo as Chrisjen Avasarala, UN Deputy Undersecretary of Executive Administration, later UN Secretary-General
- Frankie Adams as Roberta "Bobbie" W. Draper (seasons 2–6), an MMC (Martian Marine Corps) gunnery sergeant
- Cara Gee as Camina Drummer (seasons 4–6; recurring seasons 2–3), Tycho Station's Belter head of security, later the commanding officer of the Behemoth and Medina Station, later the leader of the rebel faction opposing the Free Navy
- Keon Alexander as Marco Inaros (seasons 5–6; recurring season 4), a Belter faction leader, later head of the Free Navy
- Jasai Chase-Owens as Filip Inaros (seasons 5–6; guest season 4), Marco and Naomi's son
- Nadine Nicole as Clarissa Melpomene Mao (seasons 5–6; recurring season 3; guest season 4), Jules-Pierre Mao's elder daughter who initially seeks revenge against Holden, later a crew member on Rocinante

=== Recurring ===
==== Introduced in season 1 ====
- Chad L. Coleman as Fred Lucius Johnson, "the Butcher of Anderson Station" (seasons 1–2, 5; guest seasons 3–4), a UNN colonel-turned-leader of the OPA on Tycho Station
- Martin Roach as Michael Souther (seasons 1, 3; guest season 2), a UNN admiral
- François Chau as Jules-Pierre Mao (seasons 1–3), the owner of Mao-Kwikowski Mercantile
- Athena Karkanis as Tavi Muss (season 1), Miller's former partner at Star Helix Security
- Jared Harris as Anderson Dawes (season 1; guest season 2), the OPA's Ceres liaison
- Jay Hernandez as Dmitri Havelock (season 1), Miller's Earther partner at Star Helix Security
- Lola Glaudini as Shaddid (season 1), captain of Star Helix Security's Ceres detachment
- Kevin Hanchard as Sematimba (season 1; guest season 2), a detective on Eros
- Daniel Kash as Antony Dresden (season 1; guest season 2), Protogen's head of biological research
- Brian George (season 1; guest seasons 2, 6) and Michael Benyaer (season 4) as Arjun Avasarala-Rao, Avasarala's husband
- Greg Bryk as Lopez (season 1), an MMC lieutenant assigned to the Martian Congressional Republic Navy (MCRN) Donnager
- Elias Toufexis as Kenzo Gabriel (season 1), a Davila Aerospatiale spy on Tycho Station
- Sara Mitich as Gia (season 1), a brothel employee in the Rosse Buurt district of Ceres, who is secretly teaching the Belter language to Havelock

==== Introduced in season 2 ====
- Andrew Rotilio as Diogo Harari (seasons 2–3; guest season 1), a young Belter from Ceres in the OPA
- Nick E. Tarabay as Cotyar Ghazi (seasons 2–3), a security professional working for Avasarala
- Terry Chen as Praxideke "Prax" Meng (seasons 2–3; guest season 6), a botanist from Ganymede
- Leah Jung as Mei Meng (seasons 2–3), Prax's daughter
- Ted Atherton as Lawrence Strickland (seasons 2–3), a pediatrician on Ganymede
- Jonathan Whittaker as Esteban Sorrento-Gillis (seasons 2–3), the UN Secretary General
- Byron Mann as Augusto Nguyễn (seasons 2–3), a UNN admiral
- Mpho Koaho as Richard Travis (season 2), an Earth-born MMC private assigned to the MCRN Scirocco
- Carlos Gonzalez-Vio as Paolo Cortázar (season 2; guest seasons 5–6), a Protogen scientist
- Peter Outerbridge as Martens (season 2), an MCRN captain and chaplain assigned to the MCRN Scirocco
- Sarah Allen as T. Hillman (season 2), an MMC private assigned to the MCRN Scirocco
- Dewshane Williams as L. Sa'id (season 2), an MMC corporal assigned to the MCRN Scirocco
- Conrad Pla as Janus (season 2), an UNMC colonel assigned to the UNS Arboghast
- Ted Whittall as Michael Iturbi (season 2), a UN scientist assigned to the UNS Arboghast
- Hugh Dillon as Sutton (season 2), an MCRN lieutenant assigned to the MCRN Scirocco
- Jeff Seymour as Pyotr Korshunov (season 2), the former MCR Minister of Defense

==== Introduced in season 3 ====
- David Strathairn as Klaes Ashford (seasons 3–4), a Belter pirate-turned-executive officer of the OPAS Behemoth
- Elizabeth Mitchell as Anna Volovodov (season 3; guest season 6), a Methodist pastor and speech writer
- Brock Johnson as Grigori (season 3), a former acquaintance of Ashford's aboard the OPAS Behemoth
- Chris Owens as Kolvoord (season 3), a science officer aboard the UNN Thomas Prince
- Genelle Williams as Tilly Fagan (season 3), a socialite aboard the UNN Thomas Prince who befriends Anna
- Anna Hopkins as Monica Stuart (seasons 3, 5–6), an Earther journalist filming a documentary on the Rocinante
- Jaeden Noel as Katoa Merton (season 3), Mei's friend
- Raven Dauda as Nono Volovodov (season 3), Anna's wife
- Brandon McGibbon as Elio "Cohen" Casti (season 3), Monica's technical crewman and camera operator
- Ari Millen as Stanni Kulp (season 3), a Savage Industries electrician assigned to the UNN Thomas Prince
- Paulino Nunes as Hank Cortez (season 3), a priest aboard the UNN Thomas Prince
- Sabryn Rock as Riko Oshi (season 3), an MMC private assigned to the MCRN Xuesen
- Hamed Dar as Jed Trepp (season 3), an MMC private assigned to the MCRN Xuesen

==== Introduced in season 4 ====
- Burn Gorman as Adolphus Murtry (season 4), chief of security for Royal Charter Energy (RCE) aboard the Edward Israel
- Lyndie Greenwood as Elvi Okoye (season 4; guest seasons 5–6), a biologist working for the RCE
- Rosa Gilmore as Lucia Mazur (season 4), a medical technician on Ilus
- Patti Kim as Carol Chiwewe (season 4), a Belter leader
- Kyla Madeira as Felcia Mazur (season 4), a Belter refugee
- Steven McCarthy as Jakob Mazur (season 4), a Belter refugee
- Dayle McLeod as Leelee (season 4), a thief on Mars
- Jess Salgueiro as Chandra Wei (season 4), corporate security officer
- Zach Smadu as Fayez Sarkis (season 4), a scientist aboard the Edward Israel
- Kolton Stewart as David Draper (season 4), Bobbie's nephew
- Lily Gao as Nancy Gao (season 4; guest season 5), a candidate for UN secretary-general
- Paul Schulze as Esai Martin (season 4), a corrupt police officer on Mars

==== Introduced in season 5 ====
- José Zúñiga as Carlos "Bull" de Baca (season 5), chief of security on Tycho Station
- Michael Irby as Felix Delgado (season 5), a UN admiral
- Sugith Varughese as David Paster (season 5), a high-ranking UN official
- Brent Sexton as Cyn (season 5), an old friend of Naomi
- Bahia Watson as Sakai (season 5), chief engineer on Tycho station
- Oluniké Adeliyi as Karal (season 5), a henchman in the Inaros faction
- George Tchortov as Leveau (season 5), a Tycho officer who assists Holden
- Sandrine Holt as Oksana Busch (season 5), a member of Drummer's crew
- Samer Salem as Josep (seasons 5–6), a member of Drummer's crew
- Vanessa Smythe as Michio (seasons 5–6), a member of Drummer's crew
- Lara Jean Chorostecki as Emily Babbage (season 5), a Martian lieutenant
- Somkele Idhalama as a Tycho Engineer (season 5), helping Holden pursue the Zmeya
- Jacob Mundell as Erich (season 5), a childhood friend of Amos in Baltimore

==== Introduced in season 6 ====
- Krista Bridges as Sandrine Kirino (season 6; guest season 3), captain of the MCRN Hammurabi
- Conrad Coates as Sidiqi (season 6), a UNN admiral
- Ted Dykstra as Gareth (season 6), an aide to Chrisjen Avasarala
- Emma Ho as Cara (season 6), young girl colonist on Laconia
- Ian Ho as Xan (season 6), young boy colonist of Laconia
- Daniel Jun as Gary (season 6), Cara and Xan's father
- Dianne Aguilar as Dot (season 6), Cara and Xan's mother
- Stuart Hughes as Liang Walker (season 6), a Free Navy captain
- Kathleen Robertson as Rosenfeld Guoliang (season 6), second-in-command to Marco Inaros
- Jo Vannicola as Nico Sanjrani (season 6), administrator of Ceres Station

=== Guest ===
- Jean Yoon as Theresa Yao (season 1), captain of the MCRN Donnager
- Rachael Crawford as J. Peñano (season 2), an MCRN admiral
- Atticus Mitchell as Sinopoli (season 3), an MCRN ensign who served aboard the MCRN Kittur Chennamma
- Natalie Lisinska as Shaffer (season 3), a lieutenant aboard the UNN Agatha King who is loyal to Souther
- Morgan Kelly as Mancuso (season 3), a lieutenant aboard the UNN Agatha King who is loyal to Souther
- John Kapelos as Ren Hazuki (season 3), a Savage Industries electrician assigned to the UNN Thomas Prince
- Yanna McIntosh as Chandra Lucas (season 3), captain of the MCRN Askia, later captain of the MCRN Xuesen
- Tim DeKay as Emil Sauveterre (season 5), a Martian admiral
- Gabriel Darku as Yoan (season 6), friend of Filip
- Dylan Taylor as Winston Duarte (season 6), former Martian admiral on Laconia
- Joe Perry as Tadeo (season 6), repair technician onboard the Pella

== Production ==
=== Development ===
The Expanse is based on the novel series of the same name by James S. A. Corey, a pen name of the authors Daniel Abraham and Ty Franck, who also serve as writers and producers for the show. The first novel, Leviathan Wakes (2011), was nominated for the Hugo Award for Best Novel and Locus Award for Best Science Fiction Novel. On September 4, 2013, The Expanse was optioned for television by Alcon Television Group. On April 11, 2014, Syfy announced a straight-to-series commitment to a television adaptation of the book series, and ordered the production of 10 one-hour-long episodes for the first season. On that date Syfy President Dave Howe commented: "The Expanse is epic in scale and scope and promises to be Syfy's most ambitious series to date". Mark Fergus and Hawk Ostby wrote the pilot and served as writers and showrunners alongside Naren Shankar.

Terry McDonough was revealed to be directing the first two episodes of the series in October 2014. In May 2015, before the first season aired, writing commenced for a second season, which was ordered in December 2015. The second season of The Expanse premiered on February 1, 2017. On March 16, 2017, The Expanse was renewed by Syfy for a 13-episode third season to air in 2018. Four digital comics based on the books and tying into the television series have been published by ComiXology. The first focuses on the origin of James Holden and was released February 1, 2017. The next three, highlighting the origins of other characters are: Naomi Nagata, released April 19, 2017; Alex Kamal, released May 24, 2017; and Amos Burton, released July 12, 2017. The show's title sequence was animated and directed by Australian studio Breeder and its VFX team.

=== Cancellation and renewals ===
Alcon Entertainment produces and finances the series. It sold three seasons to Syfy, which canceled the series in May 2018. Fans, who called themselves Screaming Firehawks, protested the cancellation, gathering over 100,000 signatures for an online petition. They lobbied Amazon Studios and Netflix to greenlight the fourth season and a crowdfunding campaign paid for an airplane to fly a "#SaveTheExpanse" banner around Amazon Studios. Celebrities including Wil Wheaton, George R. R. Martin, Patton Oswalt and Andreas Mogensen supported the campaign. The same month, Amazon Prime Video picked up the series for a fourth season, which was released on December 12, 2019. In July 2019, Amazon renewed The Expanse for a fifth season, which premiered on December 15, 2020.

On November 24, 2020, ahead of the fifth season's release, Amazon renewed the series for a sixth and final season. Filming started in late January 2021. However, the authors of the novels and writers on the series, Daniel Abraham and Ty Franck, have stated that they view season 6 as a "pause" rather than a conclusion and that Alcon Entertainment "is very committed to the IP", Alcon's Andrew Kosove and Broderick Johnson said that they are "considering all kinds of interesting possibilities". On October 8, 2021, it was announced that the sixth and final season would premiere on December 10, 2021.

In January 2023, it was announced that the continuation of the series, set between Babylon's Ashes and Persepolis Rising, would be adapted into a 12-issue comic book series, The Expanse: Dragon Tooth.

=== Casting ===
In July 2014, Thomas Jane was cast as Joe Miller. In August 2014, Steven Strait and Shohreh Aghdashloo's attachment to the series as James Holden, and Chrisjen Avasarala was announced. October of that same year, Dominique Tipper, Cas Anvar, Paulo Costanzo, and Wes Chatham were cast as Naomi Nagata, Alex Kamal, Shed Garvey, and Amos Burton while Jonathan Banks and Jay Hernandez were announced to be guest starring in the series. One month later, Shawn Doyle was cast as Sadavir Errinwright, while Chad L. Coleman and Jared Harris were cast in the recurring roles of Fred Johnson and Anderson Dawes, respectively. Frankie Adams was cast as Bobbie Draper for the second season in April 2016. On January 21, 2020, Keon Alexander, Nadine Nicole, and Jasai Chase Owens (who portray Marco Inaros, Clarissa Melpomene Mao, and Filip Inaros, respectively), were promoted to the main cast for the fifth season. Later, Lily Gao was cast in a recurring role as Nancy Gao for the fourth and fifth seasons, a candidate for UN secretary-general. Anvar did not return for the sixth and final season after being the subject of multiple sexual misconduct allegations.

=== Filming ===
Produced by Alcon Television and The Sean Daniel Company, principal photography on the first season started on October 29, 2014, in Toronto and concluded on March 27, 2015. The second season filmed between April 13, 2016, and September 12, 2016. Filming for season 3 began on July 12, 2017. In February 2019, cast member Lyndie Greenwood announced that the fourth season concluded filming. Filming for the fifth season began on September 23, 2019, and ended on February 21, 2020. Production on the sixth season took place between January 27, 2021, and May 7, 2021. It was impacted by COVID-19 pandemic restrictions, as was post-production of the fifth season.

=== Title sequence ===
The title sequence of the series has been lauded by reviewers for its ability to elegantly and wordlessly convey important information about the worlds in which the series takes place. The title sequence was created by Breeder, a motion graphics design studio in Brisbane, Australia. Drawing comparisons to the opening sequence of Game of Thrones, Jason Morehead of Opuszine notes that not only does it depict the development of Earth's expansion into the solar system, it introduces the viewer to the political dynamics within the series. "Earth is the old guard, intent on controlling the system and her former colonies; technologically advanced Mars is driven to become a paradise; and the Belt is fighting to keep from being treated as a second-class citizen by both Earth and Mars."

While the title sequence does change visually as the series progresses, the lyrics that accompany Clinton Shorter's title theme – written and performed by Lisbeth Scott – remain the same. Scott noted that her words were drawn from Norwegian, though she apologized for any errors in syntax, grammar and pronunciation.

=== Music ===
The show's soundtrack was composed by Shorter. The first season's soundtrack dubbed The Expanse Season 1 – The Original Television Soundtrack, consisting of nineteen tracks, was released by Lakeshore Records, on May 20, 2016, via iTunes, and on May 26, 2016, via Amazon.

=== Language ===
The Belter characters speak Belter Creole, an invented language created for the show by linguist Nick Farmer; these characters speak English with a distinctive accent. As explained in one article, "People who have migrated to the Belt come from all over Earth speaking dozens of languages, and they're often isolated for years at a time on remote mining stations. To communicate, they evolve a creole called Belter, which becomes the lingua franca for what is essentially the solar system's new proletariat."

== Release ==
The pilot episode was screened at San Diego Comic-Con in July 2015. In the United States, seasons 1 to 3 of The Expanse were broadcast by Syfy and streamed on Amazon Prime Video. In Canada, these seasons aired on Space and streamed on Crave. In New Zealand, these seasons aired on Sky. In all other countries where Netflix is available, seasons 1 and 2 were streamed until September 2018. On February 8, 2019, Prime Video took over exclusive distribution of the first three seasons worldwide in preparation for premiere of the fourth season in 2019.

The complete series has been released on Blu-ray and DVD as both individual seasons and a complete series set.

== Reception ==
=== Critical response ===
==== Season 1 ====
On Rotten Tomatoes, the first season has a score of 78% with an average rating of 7.1 out of 10 based on 46 reviews. The site's consensus states: "The Expanse blends sci-fi elements and detective noir into a visually compelling whole, though it takes a few episodes for the story to capture viewers' intrigue." The first season received a rating of 65 out of 100 on Metacritic based on reviews from 23 critics, indicating "generally favorable reviews". Reporting on the pilot screening, io9's Lauren Davis declared herself "blown away" by The Expanse, appreciating its "incredible sense of scale" and its "deeply thought out future world that reflects on our present one, with high production values and characters who speak and act like real people". Max Nicholson of IGN characterized the pilot as "grim and dramatic", and a "very dense hour of television", with the terminology and large cast sometimes difficult to follow for viewers unfamiliar with the novels, but highlighted the pilot's "gorgeous" visuals and effects reminiscent of Battlestar Galactica, Dune and Firefly. Writing for Variety, Maureen Ryan was unimpressed by the first four episodes "awkwardly linking a series of somewhat muddled stories" and the series's stereotypical characters but credited it with tackling "issues of class, representation and exploitation" and a convincing design. At Tor.com, Justin Landon highlighted The Expanse's "bold and unique cinematography" and its claustrophobic, discomforting set designs, as well as the "extremely faithful" characterization, but remarked that the patois spoken by the Belters, the natives of the asteroid belt, made the series difficult to follow.

==== Season 2 ====
On Rotten Tomatoes, the season has a score of 95% with an average rating of 9 out of 10 based on 21 reviews. The site's critical consensus reads, "The Expanse's second season offers more of the show's excellent signature production values while increasing character development and politically thrilling narratives." On Metacritic, it has a score of 77 out of 100 based on 5 reviews. Writing for io9, Katherine Trendacosta noted how the show had become "shockingly prescient", insofar as many of the issues and ideas explored by The Expanse mirrored contemporary trends in global politics. Brian Tallerico, in "Why The Expanse Is the Best Sci-FI TV Show You're Not Watching" for Rolling Stone, praised the show for its contemporary political relevance and called its willingness to mix tones, and its protagonists, laudable. He summarized that at its core, The Expanse was all about people responding to fear – fear of the other, fear of the new, fear of inequality, fear of death. Writing for 13.7: Cosmos & Culture, a blog hosted by NPR, astrophysicist Adam Frank praised the show and its writers for the scientific realism. He wrote that "more than any other TV space-themed show, it gets the science right".

==== Season 3 ====
On Rotten Tomatoes, the season has a score of 100% with an average rating of 8.6 out of 10 based on 26 reviews. The site's critical consensus reads, "Building on earlier potential and extending character arcs throughout a solidly crafted third season, The Expanse continues to impress – and shows no signs of abating." Michael Ahr of Den of Geek said the series "wowed fans with its complex characters, its political intrigue, its attention to scientific authenticity, and its stunningly good visual effects, and with several more books in the series that inspired the show, there's plenty more source material for the adaptation to explore in future seasons." Liz Shannon Miller of IndieWire praised the performances of Coleman and Strait in the absence of the Joe Miller character, saying "In general, while the mid-Season 2 departure of Joe Miller (Thomas Jane) and his wonderful hats does leave a bit of a vacuum, the ensemble has coalesced nicely, with both established performers like Chad L. Coleman and relative newcomers like Strait settling into their roles." Speaking about the premiere, Kevin Yeoman said, "All in all ... season three begins by dramatically raising the immediate stakes of the story without drastically altering the dynamics of the show itself."

==== Season 4 ====
On Rotten Tomatoes, the season has a score of 100% with an average rating of 9 out of 10 based on 34 reviews. The site's critical consensus reads, "Smart and thrilling as ever, The Expanse's fourth season doesn't miss a beat, successfully navigating network changes without losing any of its rich character work or narrative complexities." The season received a rating 91 out of 100 on Metacritic based on reviews from 4 critics indicating "universal acclaim". Writing for Den of Geek, Michael Ahr gave it a 5/5 review and wrote, "With its brilliantly crafted, multilayered plot, The Expanse season four proves itself worthy of Amazon's rescue in a nearly perfect season." Sadie Gennis of TV Guide also praised the fourth season, giving it a score of 4.5/5.

==== Season 5 ====
On Rotten Tomatoes, the season has a score of 100% with an average rating of 8.7 out of 10 based on 32 reviews. The site's critical consensus reads, "The Expanse's many threads come to a head in an excellent fifth season that expertly capitalizes on everything that makes the show work while setting the stage for an epic final season." The season received a rating 82 out of 100 on Metacritic based on reviews from 5 critics indicating "universal acclaim".

==== Season 6 ====
On Rotten Tomatoes, the season has a score of 96% with an average rating of 8.6 out of 10 based on 23 reviews. The site's critical consensus reads, "The Expanse's truncated final season honors the series' characters and themes with a graceful conclusion."

=== Scientific accuracy ===
The Expanse was widely praised for its scientific realism and technical accuracy, with executive producer Naren Shankar – a former PhD student in applied engineering – being credited for effectively applying his knowledge of physics and engineering. The show's depiction of stealth technology, uncontrolled decompression, the vacuum of space, and spacecraft propulsion were singled out for praise, with other reviewers arguing that the show effectively prepared viewers for future scientific developments.

=== Genre and themes ===
The series has been described as a space opera by critics. Emily VanDerWerff of Vox describes the first season of the series to be a "blend of science fiction and noir-infused detective drama, with a backdrop of political intrigue". Vice has referred to the series as a "sci fi noir mystery-thriller" and as hard science fiction. Opposed to the latter, the source books' authors defined their approach as aiming for a "Wikipedia level of plausibility". To complicate the plot, they kept inertia realistic, as well as light speed delay, which solved a "cellphone problem" for the show.

Prior to the series premiere, Mark Fergus spoke of the series's Western themes: "Everywhere is kind of back to the frontier rules so it gives us all that stuff back that we lost. Cellular technology. You can get a little more Western about it." The fourth season, according to the writers, also had "space Western vibes".

Analyzing the show, Tech Times wrote that The Expanse "...is more than just a science fiction show about people traveling the solar system in spaceships. It ... covers ... politics, poverty, oppression, discrimination, and the struggle for resources in harsh environments."

=== Ratings ===
Viewership and ratings per season of The Expanse
Season	Timeslot (ET)	Episodes	First aired		Last aired		Avg. viewers (millions)	Avg. 18–49 rating
Season	Timeslot (ET)	Episodes	Date	Viewers (millions)	Date	Viewers (millions)	Avg. viewers (millions)	Avg. 18–49 rating
1	Monday 10:00 pm (premiere); Tuesday 10:00 pm	10	December 14, 2015	1.19	February 2, 2016	0.555	0.703	0.22
2	Wednesday 10:00 pm	13	February 1, 2017	0.700	April 19, 2017	0.581	0.562	0.18
3	Wednesday 9:00 pm	13	April 11, 2018	0.653	June 27, 2018	0.606	0.606	0.18

Season four was the first season not to be broadcast on live TV and not to get weekly viewership ratings. Per Parrot Analytics, the season ranked fourth in most watched digital originals in the United States in December 2019.

=== Accolades ===
Year	Award	Category	Nominee(s)	Result	Ref.
2016	Directors Guild of Canada Awards	Best Sound Editing – Television Series	Nelson Ferriera, Nathan Robitaille, Dustin Harris, Tyler Whitham, Dashen Naidoo (for "The Big Empty")	Won	
2016	Saturn Awards	Best Science Fiction Television Series	The Expanse	Nominated	
2016	Visual Effects Society Awards	Outstanding Visual Effects in a Photoreal Episode	Robert Munroe, Clint Green, Kyle Menzies, Tom Turnbull (for "Salvage")	Nominated	
2016	Dragon Awards	Best Science Fiction or Fantasy TV Series	The Expanse	Nominated	
2017	Directors Guild of Canada Awards	Outstanding Directorial Achievement in Dramatic Series	Robert Lieberman (for "Rock Bottom")	Nominated	
2017	Dragon Awards	Best Science Fiction or Fantasy TV Series	The Expanse	Nominated	
2017	Hugo Awards	Best Dramatic Presentation, Short Form	Mark Fergus, Hawk Ostby and Terry McDonough (for "Leviathan Wakes")	Won	
2017	Saturn Awards	Best Science Fiction Television Series	The Expanse	Nominated	
2018	Directors Guild of Canada Awards	Best Sound Editing – Television Series	Nelson Ferriera, Kevin Banks, Nathan Robitaille, Dustin Harris, Tyler Whitham, Dashen Naidoo (for "Home")	Won	
2018	People's Choice Awards	The Sci-Fi/Fantasy Show of 2018	The Expanse	Nominated	
2018	Saturn Awards	Best Science Fiction Television Series	The Expanse	Nominated	
2018	Dragon Awards	Best Science Fiction or Fantasy TV Series	The Expanse	Nominated	
2019	Directors Guild of Canada Awards	Best Picture Editing – Dramatic Series	Stephen Roque (for "Abaddon's Gate")	Nominated	
2019	Hugo Awards	Best Dramatic Presentation, Short Form	Daniel Abraham, Ty Franck, Naren Shankar, & Simon Cellan Jones (for "Abaddon's Gate")	Nominated	
2019	Saturn Awards	Best Streaming Science Fiction, Action & Fantasy Series	The Expanse	Nominated	
2020	Hugo Awards	Best Dramatic Presentation, Short Form	Daniel Abraham, Ty Franck, Naren Shankar, & Breck Eisner (for "Cibola Burn")	Nominated	
2020	Dragon Awards	Best Science Fiction or Fantasy TV Series	The Expanse	Nominated	
2020	Nebula Awards	Outstanding Dramatic Presentation	Dan Nowak, Amazon Prime (for "Gaugamela")	Nominated	
2021	Dragon Awards	Best Science Fiction or Fantasy TV Series	The Expanse	Won	
2021	Hugo Awards	Best Dramatic Presentation, Short Form	Dan Nowak, Nick Gomez (for "Gaugamela")	Nominated	
2021	Directors Guild of Canada Awards	Best Picture Editing – Dramatic Series	Roderick Deogrades (for "Winnipesaukee")	Nominated	
2021	Directors Guild of Canada Awards	Best Sound Editing – Dramatic Series	Nelson Ferreira, Alex Bullick, Dustin Harris, Josh Brown, Craig MacLellan, Ayaz Kamani (for "Gaugamela")	Nominated	
2021	Saturn Awards	Television Spotlight Award	The Expanse	Won	
2022	Writers Guild of America Awards	Adapted Short Form New Media	Wes Chatham, Julianna Damewood, Glenton Richards (for The Expanse: One Ship)	Nominated	
2022	Hugo Awards	Best Dramatic Presentation, Short Form	Daniel Abraham, Ty Franck, and Naren Shankar (for "Nemesis Games")	Won	
2022	Saturn Awards	Best Science Fiction Series (Streaming)	The Expanse	Nominated	
2023	Hugo Awards	Best Dramatic Presentation, Short Form	Daniel Abraham, Ty Franck, Naren Shankar and Breck Eisner (for "Babylon's Ashes")	Won	
2024	Space Rocks Inspiration Award		The Expanse	Won	

== Other media ==
=== The Expanse: A Telltale Series ===
During The Game Awards 2021, a reveal trailer announced The Expanse: A Telltale Series which was co-developed by Deck Nine Games and Telltale Games. The game is a prequel to the TV series, Cara Gee reprised her role as Camina Drummer, the executive officer onboard a scavenger ship named Artemis. Chad L. Coleman, Florence Faivre, François Chau and Shohreh Aghdashloo also reprised their roles. Episode one was released on July 27, 2023, and is published by Telltale Games for PlayStation 4, PlayStation 5, Xbox One, Xbox Series X/S, and the Epic Games Store on PC.

=== Aftershow and podcast ===
Beginning December 16, 2020, Wes Chatham and Ty Franck started hosting weekly programs that feature behind-the-scenes information about the series, first as The Expanse Season 5 Aftershow after each season's episode. Upon the conclusion of Season 5 (after the airing of the season 5 finale), they continued on Wednesdays as Ty & That Guy Podcast, covering each series' episode, from The Expanse S1E1, additionally discussing their inspirations from genre culture, and occasionally having guests both related to the series and not. The Expanse Season 6 Aftershow with Chatham and Franck, produced by Amazon Studios, was distributed by Amazon Prime Video and Ty & That Guy Podcast in video and audio formats.
