= The Straits of Messina =

1989 essay collection by Samuel R Delany

- Author: Samuel R. Delany
- Language: English
- Genre: Non-fiction
- Publisher: Serconia Press
- Publication date: 1 October 1989
- Publication place: United States
- Media type: Print
- Pages: 183 pp
- ISBN: 0-934933-04-9

The Straits of Messina is a 1989 non-fiction collection of essays, in which author and critic Samuel R. Delany discusses his own novels. The essays are published under his own name, and under the pen name K. Leslie Steiner.

The pieces by K. Leslie Steiner are written as an answer to the question "Wouldn’t it be nice to have someone say all the fine and brilliant things about my work I so desperately would like to hear…?" according to Delany's preface.

The Strait of Messina of the title is a reference to the treacherous waters between Scylla and Charybdis, a metaphor on how difficult it is for an author to write about his own works: "to negotiate the waters between the Scylla of overweening self-importance and the Charybdis of childish self-deprecation."

== Contents ==
- Preface
- The Scorpion Garden

From 1973, a proposed introduction to the as yet unpublished Hogg.

- "The Scorpion Garden" Revisited: A Note on the Anti-Pornography of Samuel R. Delany, by K. Leslie Steiner

From 1973, an essay discussing Hogg.

- Of Sex, Objects, Signs, Systems, Sales, SF, and Other Things

From 1975, a discussion on the novel Dhalgren.

- Some Remarks Toward a Reading of Dhalgren, by K. Leslie Steiner

From 1975, more discussion on Dhalgren.

- Trouble on Triton, by K. Leslie Steiner

From 1976, a review of Triton

- Ruins/Foundations; or: The Fall of the Towers Twenty Years After

From 1981/1985, a short version of the early chapters in The Motion of Light in Water.

- The Early Delany

Response to a panel given at Madison, Wisconsin, 1981.

- Tales of Nevèrÿon, by K. Leslie Steiner

From 1982, a scathing review of Tales of Nevèrÿon.

- Return... by K. Leslie Steiner

From 1986, a preface published in The Bridge of Lost Desire.
