= Driftglass/Starshards =

Collection of short stories by Samuel R. Delany

- Cover from the first edition
- Author: Samuel R. Delany
- Cover artist: John Harris
- Language: English
- Genre: Science fiction Fantasy; Short stories
- Publisher: Grafton
- Publication date: 1993
- Publication place: United Kingdom
- Media type: Print (paperback)
- Pages: 535 pp
- ISBN: 0-586-21422-4
- OCLC: 230941720

Driftglass/Starshards is a 1993 collection of short stories by Samuel R. Delany. The collection contains the entire contents of Delany's 1971 collection, Driftglass, stories from Distant Stars (1981) and others that had not previously been collected. Many of the stories originally appeared in the magazines Worlds of Tomorrow, The Magazine of Fantasy & Science Fiction, If and New Worlds or the anthologies Quark/3, Dangerous Visions and Alchemy & Academe.

Every story in this collection was later collected in Aye, and Gomorrah, and other stories, except for "Citre et Trans" and "Erik, Gwen, and D.H. Lawrence’s Esthetic of Unrectified Feeling", which were collected in Atlantis: Three Tales.

== Contents ==
- Of Doubts and Dreams
- Part One
  - "The Star Pit"
  - "Corona"
  - "Aye, and Gomorrah..."
  - "Driftglass"
  - "We, in Some Strange Power’s Employ, Move on a Rigorous Line"
  - "Cage of Brass"
  - "High Weir"
  - "Time Considered as a Helix of Semi-Precious Stones"
  - "Omegahelm"
- Part Two
  - "Prismatica"
  - "Ruins"
  - "Dog in a Fisherman’s Net"
  - "Night and the Loves of Joe Dicostanzo"
- Part Three
  - "Among the Blobs"
  - "Citre et Trans"
  - "Erik, Gwen, and D.H. Lawrence’s Esthetic of Unrectified Feeling"
