= The Ballad of Beta-2 =

1965 novel by Samuel R. Delany

- Cover of first edition paperback
- Author: Samuel R. Delany
- Illustrator: Jack Gaughan
- Cover artist: Ed Valigursky
- Language: English
- Genre: Science fiction
- Publisher: Ace Books
- Publication date: 1965
- Publication place: United States
- Media type: Print (Hardcover & Paperback)
- Pages: 96 pp
- OCLC: 4371489

The Ballad of Beta-2 is a 1965 science fiction novel by American writer Samuel R. Delany. The book was originally published as Ace Double, together with Alpha Yes, Terra No! by Emil Petaja.

== Plot ==
Cover of the 1971 first stand alone edition

The book follows Joneny Horatio T'waboga, a student of Galactic Anthropology, who studies "The Ballad of Beta-2", a poem written by the passengers of generation ships. Some of the ships were broken and all passengers killed by some unknown force, only their broken shells arriving at the destination. In others the passengers survived, but by the time the spaceships arrived at the destination star system, it has long since been settled through the already developed FTL ships. The descendants were incapable of and uninterested in settling on the system's planets, showed themselves extremely hostile to any outsiders entering their ships, and were left alone – to continue living in the spaceships as an obscure backwater culture isolated from broader human history.

The degenerate "Star Folk" and their culture arouse little interest among the flourishing interstellar human culture. Only one researcher had bothered to record their songs, these being dismissed as "derivative" due to their repeated reference to "cities", "desert" and other Earth-bound concepts. However, an Anthropology professor charges Joneny to look deeper, pointing out that these were the only humans to ever actually cross the depths of space between the stars, since later FTL ships are able to simply bypass these depths. The professor's intuition proves amply right.

The student, for his thesis, is charged with investigating the source and antecedents of a ballad which begins

She walked through the gates and the children cried,
She walked through the Market and the voices died,
She walked past the court house and the judge so still,
She walked to the bottom of Death's Head hill...

On arriving at the spot, the student finds the present day Star Folk in themselves just as much of an uninteresting dead end as had been supposed – but he still makes very startling and important discoveries. First, he encounters a kind of "child" with supernatural powers – teleportation, living in a vacuum, and more. Then he discovers the records left by earlier passengers, from which he pieces out the tragic history of these ships. This forms the bulk of the book, with the student being in effect just the frame story.

It turns out that in the early generations, the voyage went well, the fleet of generation ships proceeding as planned. It was at this time that Earth-bound terms got new meanings, "A City" being one of the ships and "The Desert" being the space between them. However, in later generations, a fanatic religious ideology arose – its main tenets being that the ships' mission was "To Bring Human Beings to the Stars", that the term "Human Being" was to be defined according to a very strict "Norm" covering both physical characteristics and social behavior – and that anyone not fitting that "Norm" was not a true "Human Being" and had to be weeded out. Fanatic Judges were set up to judge such misfits and almost invariably sentence them to death, with the Judges increasingly usurping the authority of the Captains. Misfits escaped to the weightless areas at the core of the ships, where they could easier avoid capture, and which in effect became a kind of ghetto.

Into this already perilous situation came a new dire threat – some kind of mysterious force destroying the ships one by one. The book's main protagonist, the courageous Captain of the ship Beta-2, heard a desperate plea for help from another ship and went to help. There she discovered that the destruction was caused by a mysterious being living in deep space, and that its destructive acts were not deliberate malice but miscalculated efforts to communicate with humans, who were completely beyond all its experience. Shouting "Stop!", the Captain managed to establish communications with the deep space being, and make it stop, saving her own ship and most of the others.

To her shock and surprise, the deep space being spoke in her mind, saying "I love you" – having learned from her mind what humans understood by "love" and in a way transformed itself into a "he". The ensuing encounter left her pregnant, and eventually giving birth to a Wonder Child – the being which the student would much later encounter. However, a woman being pregnant was a clear violation of the Judges' "Norm", as on the ships new humans were born only artificially, being chosen by prospective parents in the genetic "market" referred to in the ballad. Thus, after giving birth the Captain was judged and executed. And having thus completely overthrown the Captains' authority. the Judges and their followers embarked on a wholesale hunt and extermination of all misfits. Eventually, only those fitting the "Norm" were left – their descendants being completely degenerate at the journey's end.

However, the Miracle Child, born of the Deep Space being and the Captain, was there – able and willing to greatly facilitate spaceborne Humanity in making contact with newly discovered alien species and cultures.

== Publication history ==
Delany wrote "three-fourths" of the novel in four days in 1962, the same time when he was writing his trilogy The Fall of the Towers. The book was finished in April 1964, it was originally published as Ace Double M-121, together with Alpha Yes, Terra No! by Emil Petaja. The first stand alone edition was published in 1971. In 1977 a corrected edition came out, in a hardcover edition published by Gregg Press with an introduction by David G. Hartwell.

== Themes and reception ==
The Ballad of Beta-2 shares some commons themes with other Delany's books, like The Einstein Intersection (bodiless aliens, the theme of the "human norm"), Stars in My Pocket Like Grains of Sand and Babel-17 (linguistic play, decipherment of alien language). Lavelle Porter sees the book "to be a reckoning with what World War II wrought, including the horrors of the Holocaust and the United States’ descent into the anticommunist paranoia of the McCarthy era", and compares it with The Jewels of Aptor and The Fall of the Towers (both set in "imagine worlds in the aftermath of nuclear war"). Porter also notes that it can be "read through the lenses of information and misinformation"; and writes about physical abnormality theme, common for Delany's writing:

The Ballad of Beta-2 exemplifies Delany's career-long depictions of disability and physical abnormality. Some of the One-Eyes are missing limbs or other body parts, others are marked as abnormal because their physical characteristics do not match The Norm. The leadership of the Star Folk uses the court system to purge impurity out of the race. As one judge puts it: "Our ancestors charged us with bringing human beings to the stars. And no deviation will be tolerated. How long ago was it that One-Eyed conspirators took over Epsilon-7 and destroyed it?".

The book's plot includes a re-enactment of some of the main themes of Christian theology - the Immaculate Conception and birth of a miraculous child.

Jane Weedman notes the theme of cultural ethnocentricity (Joneny refused to study Star Folk, because he considers his own civilization to be superior), the role of myth in relation to history, and the theme of artist/criminal in society (One-Eyes are example of artists who were called criminals by the law). Carl Freedman finds in the Ballad "a level of interest in language and in the self-conscious process of literary composition almost unprecedented in science fiction".

== Sources ==
- Barbour, Douglas (1979). Worlds Out Of Words: The SF Novels of Samuel R. Delany. Frome, Somerset, UK: Bran's Head Books Ltd. ISBN 978-0-905220-13-0.
- Clute, John; Nicholls, Peter (1995). The Encyclopedia of Science Fiction (2 ed.). New York: St. Martin's Griffin. ISBN 0-312-13486-X.
- Tuck, Donald H. (1974). The Encyclopedia of Science Fiction and Fantasy. Chicago: Advent. ISBN 0-911682-20-1.
