= Stars in My Pocket Like Grains of Sand =

1984 novel by Samuel R. Delany

Stars in my Pocket Like Grains of Sand
- Dust-jacket from the first edition
- Author: Samuel R. Delany
- Cover artist: Royo
- Language: English
- Genre: Science fiction novel
- Publisher: Bantam Books
- Publication date: 1984
- Publication place: United States
- Media type: Print (hardback & paperback)
- Pages: 368 pp
- ISBN: 978-0-553-05053-0
- OCLC: 11685942
- Dewey Decimal: 813/.54 19
- LC Class: PS3554.E437 S7 1984
- Followed by: The Splendor and Misery of Bodies, of Cities (unfinished)

Stars in My Pocket Like Grains of Sand (1984) is a science fiction novel by Samuel R. Delany. It is part of what would have been a "diptych", in Delany's description, of which the second half, The Splendor and Misery of Bodies, of Cities, remains unfinished.

== Plot summary ==
=== Setting ===
The novel takes place in a distant future in which diverse human societies have developed on some 6,000 planets. Many of these worlds are shared with intelligent nonhumans, although only one alien species (the mysterious Xlv) also possesses faster-than-light travel. In an attempt to find a stable defense against the phenomenon known as Cultural Fugue (a process where "socioeconomic pressures [reach] a point of technological recomplication and perturbation where the population completely destroys all life across the planetary surface"), many human worlds have aligned themselves with one of two broad factions: the Sygn, which promotes and celebrates social diversity, and the Family, which promotes adherence to an idealized norm of human relations modeled on the nuclear family.

=== Prologue: A World Apart ===
The novel opens with a prologue set on the planet Rhyonon. Korga, a tall, "ugly", misfit youth, undergoes the Radical Anxiety Termination, or RAT, procedure, a form of psychosurgery, after which he "will be a slave" "but [he] will be happy". From then on he will be known as Rat Korga. After he has lived under a number of masters, all life on the surface of Rat Korga's world is destroyed by a conflagration.

=== Monologues: Visible and Invisible Persons Distributed in Space ===
It is left up to debate whether Rat's world was destroyed by "Cultural Fugue" or by the mysterious Xlv spacecraft who were present in the Rhyonon system when the disaster occurred. At the time of the disaster, Rat Korga was deep underground inside a refrigerated room, allowing him to survive (though badly injured) and making him the only known being to survive his world's destruction and possible Cultural Fugue. According to Reid-Pharr, Rat Korga represents the remnants of disaster. Thus, he serves as a reminder of the possibility of Cultural Fugue and the destruction of a planet, which is part of what makes him so appealing to the inhabitants of Velm.

The action then moves to Velm, a Sygn-aligned world that humanity shares with its native three-sexed intelligent species, the evelm, and where sexual relationships take many forms — monogamous, promiscuous, anonymous, and interspecies. Resident Marq Dyeth, an "industrial diplomat" who helps manage the transfer of technology between different societies, is informed that Rat Korga is his perfect sexual match by an associate in the powerful and mysterious Web, an organization that manages information flows between worlds. Equipping Rat Korga with a prosthesis (the rings of Vondramach Okk, a tyrant who once ruled ten planets and employed one of Marq's ancestors) that restores the initiative he lost due to the RAT procedure, the Web sends him to Velm under the pretext that he is a student, and he and Marq begin a romantic and sexual affair.

During their time together, Korga and Marq go dragon hunting, a process which initially Korga mistakes to involve catching and killing dragons. However, when he hits a dragon with his bow, Korga can see through the dragon's eyes and experience what the dragon is experiencing, prompting Rat to announce "I was a dragon!", and the realisation that no dragons are going to be killed. As they return to the city of Morgre, in which Dyethsome, Marq's ancestral home presides, they notice a large gathering of people. They seek shelter from the crowd, who appear to be gathering to see Rat Korga, with acquaintances of Marq's friend Santine. One of the people they are with called JoBonnot informs them that Marq's sister Black Lars' planned "informal supper" has been cancelled. However, later Marq discovers that the gathering was not cancelled but changed to a "formal supper".

They return to Dyethshome where they attend the dinner party which involves everyone participating in hand-feeding one another. The dinner is held in the honour of the Thants, a family from the ice planet Zetzor. The Thants are considering moving to Nepiy in order to become a "Focus Unit", through which they will act as representatives of the values held by The Family. The dinner soon becomes chaotic due to the disruptive presence of the Thants and the ever-growing group gathering outside to show their interest in Rat Korga. Marq overhears the Thants making derogatory comments toward the evelmi, and calling the people of the South of Velm "lizard-loving perverts". Soon after, Rat Korga is forced to leave Velm and be permanently separated from Marq. According to Avilez, Rat represents the hidden secret of what happened to Rhyanon, a fact which has caused an upheaval of society and poses a threat to the Web.

=== Epilogue: Morning ===
Marq contemplates his loss of Rat Korga. He learns from Japril, a friend of his in the Web who set up Marq's initial meeting with Korga, that their "experiment didn't work" and that it was "too dangerous" to leave Korga on Velm, due to the threat of Cultural Fugue. The reader learns more about the nuances of Marq's sexual attraction and his desire for Korga. According to Avilez, Marq's desire for Korga disrupts the power held by the Web.

== Major themes ==
=== Fractured subjectivity ===
Thomas Foster argues that Stars in My Pocket treats "fractured subjectivity" as a natural condition by representing "nonnormative racial, sexual, and familiar formations and practices" as normal within Marq's world. Quoting directly from the novel, Foster claims that "[t]he utopian project of this novel resides in its attempt to imagine a future setting in which 'the 'fragmented subject' is at its healthiest, happiest, and most creative because society and economics contrive... to make questions of unity and centerness irrelevant'" This theme of fractured identity is part of Delany's own postmodern critique of identity that treats social categories like race, sexuality, gender, and class as absolute and static.

=== Cleansing ===
In his essay Clean, Robert F. Reid-Pharr argues that what Delany achieves in Stars "is a thematization of the complex ways the spectacle of gay male identity is established through a set of essentially ritualistic practices wherein the gay man is figured clean or more precisely cleansing." The character of Korga, and his movement through RAT procedures into liberation and then to corporate slavery exemplifies this process in Stars, and Reid-Pharr also suggests a connection in this method of identity construction between the gay male subject and the subject position of the African-American slave.

=== Gender and sexuality ===
Dr. Paivi Väätänen argues that Delany changes the logic of gender, sexuality, and language, confusing the reader, but perpetuating a liberal rejection of heteronormativity. Sexual identity is extremely liberal in Morgre due to the South of Velm's political alignment with the Sygn. Although, homosexuality is not overly prevalent, it is accepted, normalised, and spoken about freely amongst the people there. Marq discusses how in the city in Morgre there are “more varied kinds of sex” than on the outskirts. In Morgre, every person, including evelmi, is labelled a woman and the use of the pronouns ‘she/her’ are most common. For those of whom one finds to be sexually desirable, one uses the pronouns ‘he/him’. When Korga remarks that on Rhyanon, people spoke of both women and men, Marq replies, 'I know the word "man"...It's an archaic term. Sometimes you'll read over it in some old piece or other.' However, humans are referred to as male or female, depending on their sex organs, even though most of the time, the reader is left without an explanation of whether a human is male or female. The reader is told that evelmi can be male, female or neuter (all of which can become pregnant) but particular evelmi are never identified as such. This sexual and gender ambiguity and fluidity deconstructs binary structures of identity.

On Rhyanon, not only were sexual relationships between two men illegal until age twenty seven, but it was illegal at all times for a short person (like Marq) and a tall person (like Korga) to have sexual contact with one another. Slavery and radical regulations of sexual proclivity are two examples of the extremely conservative nature of Rhyanon. According to Väätänen, because these laws are largely left unexplained, the reader is forced to think about real laws which regulate sexuality, in our society.

== Genre of science fiction ==
Stars in My Pocket like Grains of Sand is about the distant future but the ideas that Delany writes about are reflections of the contemporary world. Delany himself has said, "Science fiction is not ‘about the future.’ Science fiction is in dialogue with the present...[the science fiction writer] indulge[s] in a significant distortion of the present that sets up a rich and complex dialogue with the reader's here and now." While Stars in My Pocket like Grains of Sand provides an alternative and unconventional relationship between humanity and the natural world, Delany reminds the reader to be critical about the extent in which the social distortions in the novel are actually “distant” from the current social order. As a result, Stars in My Pocket like Grains of Sand critiques and disrupts contemporary understandings of the world. These ruptures occur in from Delany's use of third-person gender pronouns, to the redefinition of family and kinship, to the concept of technicity (technologically driven modes of social differentiation and belonging). By forcing the reader to constantly go through these breaks and fissures in their social understandings, Delany reveals "the arbitrariness of these signifiers, their contingency and openness to recontextualization…as they move across worlds, literally and figuratively."

== Connections to Delany's other work ==
Stars has a number of plot elements that are similar to certain elements in Triton. Most notable is the presence in both novels of the General Information service, although it is more sophisticated in Stars (one need merely think a question for GI to place the knowledge in one's mind, as opposed to Triton's GI which takes questions on machines similar to modern computers). Both novels also feature aboveground and institutionalized versions of gay male cruising spaces, although open to all genders and sexual preferences; in Triton the protagonist visits such a space in the form of an indoor club, while in Stars the protagonists visit one of their city's many parklike runs set aside for that purpose. Finally, the Family/Sygn conflict in Stars is similar to the conflict between the social systems of Earth and the Outer Satellites in Triton; a "Sygn" is present in Triton, but is a minor religious cult mentioned very briefly.

Delany's short story "Omegahelm" (found in Aye, and Gomorrah, and other stories) is set in the same universe as Stars; it concerns Vondramach Okk (see above) and her one attempt to have a child.

Times Square Red, Times Square Blue, two nonfiction essays written by Delany, also include descriptions of cross-class, cross-ethnic, non-monogamous sexual encounters similar to those explored by Marq and Korga in the Stars.

== The Splendor and Misery of Bodies, of Cities ==
All editions of Stars contain an author's note stating that it is the first half of a diptych, the second half of which is the novel The Splendor and Misery of Bodies, of Cities. Delany took this title from the translator's foreword to Richard Howard's translation of Baudelaire's Les Fleurs du Mal. An excerpt from Splendor was printed in the Review of Contemporary Fiction in September, 1996. In a 2001 interview, Delany gave this brief summary:

"The book was conceived of as a city novel. For the bulk of it, the main characters, Rat and Marq, try to make their home in a city on the other side of the planet Velm from the one Marq was born and raised in. Then they have to journey back to Dyethshome, in an educational trip across Marq's world. In the course of it, a number of things that once looked pretty fair in volume one turn out not to be so pleasant in volume two."

Splendor is unfinished, and is unlikely to ever be finished. Delany has stated two reasons for this in various writings and public appearances. First, much of the creative impetus for Stars came from his relationship with his then-partner, Frank Romeo (to whom the novel is dedicated); this relationship ended soon after the novel was published, removing much of Delany's creative energy related to the project. Second, the novel was published just as AIDS was becoming an epidemic in the gay culture Delany was immersed in, changing it in a way that shifted Delany's writing priorities.

In fact, Stars was the last of Delany's major science fiction projects until 2012's Through the Valley of the Nest of Spiders. As seen in 1984: Selected Letters, at the time Stars was published his relationship with his publisher, Bantam, underwent a major rupture, with Bantam declining to print the final volume of the Return to Nevèrÿon series, Return to Nevèrÿon (eventually published by Arbor House as The Bridge of Lost Desire). Delany's works largely went out of print in the immediately following years, and he turned to academia for his living, taking up the first of his professorial posts in 1988, at the University of Massachusetts Amherst.

== Reception ==
Dave Langford reviewed Stars in My Pocket Like Grains of Sand for White Dwarf #81, and stated that "Neither mystery nor romance is resolved, all that being kept for Book Two – fearfully titled The Splendour and Misery of Bodies, of Cities. Book One is brilliant, uneven, insufferable, an important piece of SF."

Carl Freedman referred to it as being "one of the most assured masterworks of modern American fiction."

Frederic Jameson considered it to be Delany's "finest novel," and "a unique compendium of distinct forms of otherness."

== Reviews ==
- Review by Faren Miller (1984) in Locus, #284 September 1984
- Review by Larry McCaffery (1984) in Fantasy Review, December 1984
- Review by W. Paul Ganley (1984) in Fantasy Mongers, #12 Autumn 1984
- Review [French] by Élisabeth Vonarburg? (1985) in Solaris, #59
- Review by Don D'Ammassa (1985) in Science Fiction Chronicle, #64 January 1985
- Review by Richard E. Geis (1985) in Science Fiction Review, Spring 1985
- Review by Darrell Schweitzer (1985) in Science Fiction Review, Spring 1985
- Review by Baird Searles (1985) in Isaac Asimov's Science Fiction Magazine, April 1985
- Review by Thomas A. Easton [as by Tom Easton] (1985) in Analog Science Fiction/Science Fact, April 1985
- Review by Robert Coulson (1985) in Amazing Stories, May 1985
- Review by Andy Sawyer (1986) in Paperback Inferno, #58
- Review by Jim England (1986) in Vector 134
- Review by M. H. Zool (1989) in Bloomsbury Good Reading Guide to Science Fiction and Fantasy
- Review by Douglas Barbour [as by Doug Barbour] (1991) in SF Commentary, #69/70
- Review by Jo Walton (2009) in What Makes This Book So Great, (2014)
- Review by Ciro Faienza (2009) in Reflection's Edge, August 2009

== Editions ==
- Bantam, 1984, 368 pp., hardcover. ISBN 978-0-553-05053-0
- Bantam Spectra, 1985, 368 pp., paperback. ISBN 978-0-553-25149-4
- QPB/Bantam, 1985, 368 pp., paperback. no ISBN
- Grafton/Panther, 1986, 464 pp., paperback, ISBN 978-0-586-06749-9
- Bantam Spectra, 1990, 385 pp., paperback, ISBN 978-0-553-25149-4, adds a 10-page afterword on postmodernism
- Wesleyan University Press, 2004, 356 pp., paperback. ISBN 978-0-8195-6714-7, adds a foreword by Carl Freedman
