= Bread and Wine =

Bread and Wine may refer to:

- Bread and Wine (novel), a 1936 novel by Ignazio Silone
- Bread and Wine: An Erotic Tale of New York, a 1999 graphic novel by Samuel R. Delany
- Brod und Wein ("Bread and Wine"), an elegy by Friedrich Hölderlin
- Eucharist, a sacrament in Christianity
- "Bread and Wine", a song by Cowboy Junkies from Open (Cowboy Junkies album)
