= Heavenly Breakfast =

1979 memoir by Samuel R. Delany

- Cover of first edition paperback
- Author: Samuel R. Delany
- Language: English
- Genre: Non-fiction
- Publication date: 1979
- Publication place: United States
- Media type: Print (Paperback)

Heavenly Breakfast: An Essay on the Winter of Love is a 1979 memoir by author, professor, and critic Samuel R. Delany. It details the time he spent living in a commune in New York City during the winter of 1967–1968, although altering some details.

Heavenly Breakfast was also the name of the rock band that lived in the commune, which consisted of Steve Wiseman, Susan Schweers, Bert Lee (later of the Central Park Sheiks), and Delany.

The book is one of several autobiographical works by Delany.
