= Babel-17 =

1966 science fiction novel by Samuel Delany

- First edition cover
- Author: Samuel R. Delany
- Cover artist: Jerome Podwil
- Language: English
- Genre: Science fiction
- Publisher: Ace Books
- Publication date: May 1966
- Publication place: United States
- Pages: 173
- Awards: Nebula Award for Best Novel (1966, shared)

Babel-17 is a 1966 science fiction novel by American writer Samuel R. Delany. Published by Ace Books in May 1966, it follows Rydra Wong, a poet and linguist recruited during an interstellar war to decipher a language connected to enemy sabotage. Her investigation reveals a language that shapes thought and can make its speakers unwitting saboteurs. Through Rydra's effort to understand and revise it, the novel explores communication, perception, identity, and translation.

The novel shared the 1966 Nebula Award for Best Novel with Daniel Keyes's Flowers for Algernon and was a finalist for the Hugo Award for Best Novel in 1967. Retrospective assessments have praised its combination of linguistic speculation, space-opera adventure, and social imagination, while some critics have questioned its linguistic premises and narrative execution.

== Background and publication ==
Completed in July 1965, Babel-17 appeared from Ace Books as a paperback in May of the following year. In their overview of Delany's career, Jeffrey L. Buller and Catherine Rambo identify the novel as a turning point and his first to reach a wide general readership.

Delany published Empire Star later in 1966. Mark von Schlegell characterized the two works as conceived tête-bêche, a head-to-tail pairing in which each work is read in relation to the other. Within Babel-17, the novel Empire Star is attributed to the poet Muels Aranlyde, whose name is an anagram of Delany's.

A London edition followed from Gollancz in 1967. Sphere published a revised edition in 1969. Linguist Walter E. Meyers wrote that the revision corrected some of the novel's linguistic problems.

Later print editions included a 1976 Gregg Press reprint of the 1969 Sphere edition and Bantam Books' 1986 collection The Complete Nebula Award-Winning Fiction of Samuel R. Delany, which included Babel-17. In 2002, Vintage issued Babel-17/Empire Star, a paperback volume pairing the two novels. A Gollancz paperback edition appeared in the publisher's S.F. Masterworks series in 2010, followed by an Open Road Media ebook edition in 2014. The ebook included an illustrated biography of Delany using images from his early career.

== Plot ==
Babel-17 is set during an interstellar war between the Alliance and the faction it calls the Invaders. A series of sabotage attacks on Alliance installations is preceded by brief, untranslatable radio transmissions. General Forester asks Rydra Wong, a celebrated poet, former cryptographer, linguist, and licensed starship captain, to decipher them. Rydra's sensitivity to language and bodily cues is sometimes described as telepathy, although she regards it as an ability to read people and patterns.

Rydra determines that Babel-17 is not a cipher concealing a message in a familiar language, but a language in its own right. Once she recognizes that the transmissions are conversations rather than isolated coded statements, she begins to translate them and predicts the site of a forthcoming attack. Forester authorizes her to take her ship, the Rimbaud, into the field. Rydra assembles a crew including the pilot Brass, the Slug, three Navigators whose personal relationship is integral to their work, and several discorporate crew members, recorded or bodiless intelligences assigned specialized navigational tasks.

As Rydra learns Babel-17, her experience of the world changes. Ordinary speech seems slow and cumbersome, while the new language allows her to recognize physical and tactical patterns with unusual speed. She identifies weaknesses in structures, anticipates movements in battle, and assesses complex situations rapidly. At the Alliance war yards on Bellatrix, Rydra visits Baron Ver Dorco and observes the Armsedge weapons system. During a dinner, an assassin-machine kills Ver Dorco and several others, in what appears to be another act of sabotage.

Soon afterward, the Rimbaud is sabotaged, launches prematurely, and is stranded with damaged generators. Rydra concludes that the saboteur must be someone aboard her ship who can receive and act on Babel-17 transmissions. Because she is the only person known to be learning the language, she begins to suspect herself. The disabled Rimbaud is then recovered by the Jebel Tarik, a shadow ship commanded by the privateer Jebel. He assists Rydra in part because he admires her poetry.

Aboard the Jebel Tarik, Rydra meets Jebel's lieutenant, the Butcher, a scarred former convict who is amnesiac and unable to speak. He cannot understand the concepts of “I” and “you,” and refers to his body in fragments, as though its hands, feet, and actions belonged to no single person. Rydra connects his condition to Babel-17, which lacks terms or concepts corresponding to a distinct self and another person. She concludes that the language can turn those who learn it into unwitting agents of sabotage, able to act against the Alliance without recognizing their own responsibility.

Rydra's growing command of Babel-17 helps the Jebel Tarik prevail in combat with the Invaders and enables her to prevent an attempt on Jebel's life. The Butcher is also revealed to have been shaped by the language. His missing identity and inability to recognize himself result from his capture and alteration by the Invaders, who returned him as an enemy instrument. As Rydra continues to use Babel-17, she realizes that its effects extend to her as well.

During a telepathic and physical connection with the Butcher, Rydra traces the language's control over both of them. She discovers that she herself has carried out acts of sabotage, including those connected with the Rimbaud and the destruction at the Bellatrix war yards, without consciously knowing it. The Butcher is not the only saboteur aboard her ship, but an earlier victim of the same process.

At Alliance Administrative Headquarters, Rydra's friend and psychiatrist Dr. Markus T'Mwarba helps restore the Butcher's repressed identity. He is Nyles Ver Dorco, the dead Baron's son and an Alliance agent who had been sent into Invader territory, captured, and altered through Babel-17. With his identity restored, Nyles can use the knowledge and abilities previously directed against the Alliance.

Rather than destroy Babel-17, Rydra revises it by introducing concepts of self and other, creating Babel-18. The new language retains Babel-17's analytical capacities while allowing its speakers to recognize individual identity and responsibility. Rydra, Nyles, and their companions leave the Alliance's war structure with Babel-18, intending to use it to communicate across the conflict and help end the war.

== Themes and analysis ==
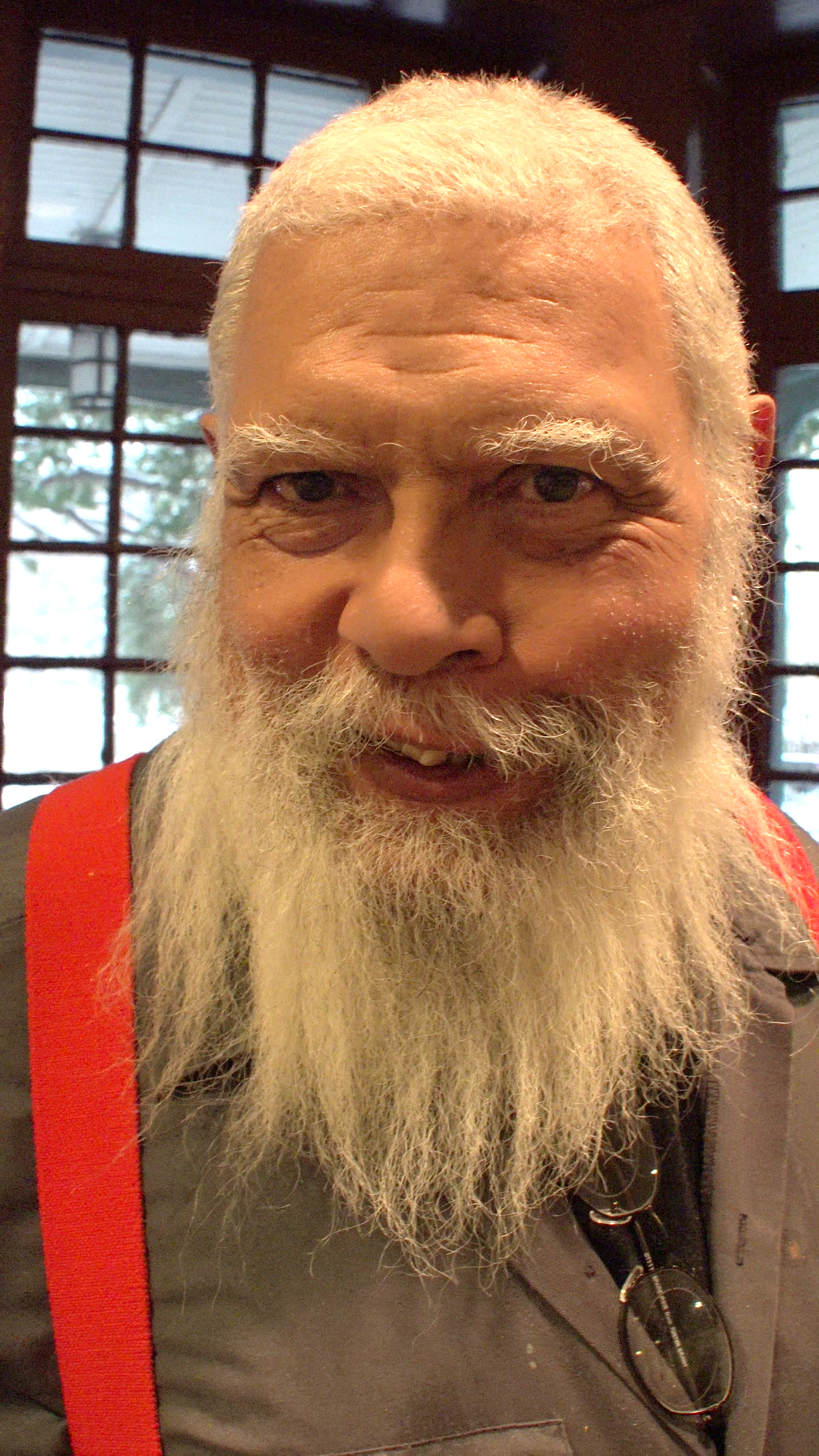
Delany at the Kelly Writers House in 2016

=== Language, perception, and identity ===
In a 2011 interview, Delany recalled that he wrote Babel-17 while strongly accepting the Sapir–Whorf hypothesis, the idea that language influences or shapes thought and perception. He subsequently rejected that hypothesis as inadequate, distinguishing language itself from the broader workings of discourse, which shape how concepts are associated and valued. The novel has nevertheless been read as an inquiry into linguistic otherness and the relationship between language, communication, and reality. Carl D. Malmgren, for example, interprets language as shaping its speakers' experience of reality rather than merely describing it. William H. Hardesty III similarly identifies communication theory, linguistics, and semiotics as central to the novel's speculative framework.

Within the novel, Babel-17 is a language whose unusual speed and precision give Rydra Wong new ways of perceiving tactical and physical relationships. Its efficiency also reshapes perception and behavior. The language's analytical power is inseparable from its coercive potential: it offers forms of technical mastery useful for surveillance, sabotage, and control while narrowing the role of experience, memory, affect, and emotion. Scholars have also linked the novel's treatment of language and cognition to cybernetic models of mind programming.

The absence of concepts equivalent to “I” and “you” in the fictional language Babel-17 links its efficiency to diminished self-awareness and moral recognition. Unable to recognize themselves or others as distinct subjects, its users can be made into unwitting instruments of sabotage. Rydra's Babel-18 restores these personal terms, together with the stories and associations they carry. This revision has been read as humanizing the Butcher and as opening communication among differing perspectives.

The novel presents translation as a process of moving between conceptual worlds. Its description of Ciribian, an alien language whose vocabulary reflects its speakers' distinctive needs and experience, illustrates the difficulty of translation when languages lack direct equivalents for one another's concepts. Rydra's work as both poet and linguist places her between social as well as linguistic divisions, though language alone does not guarantee mutual understanding. George E. Slusser identifies this tension as central to the novel: linguistic difference can isolate people, but it can also enable more creative forms of communication and eventual connection.

=== Poetry, art, and communication ===
Rydra Wong's work as a poet gives artistic practice a central role in Babel-17's treatment of communication. Her poetry, linguistic ability, and movement among communities place her outside the Alliance–Invader division. L. H. Stallings reads this position as a “third perspective” and as part of the novel's challenge to distinctions between creative and analytical knowledge. The poems by Marilyn Hacker used as epigraphs have likewise been interpreted as presenting poetry as a means of communication across differences of culture, background, and planet.

The novel develops this possibility of connection through Rydra's telepathy and her relationship with the Butcher. Susan Stone-Blackburn interprets telepathy as a learned intellectual achievement associated with linguistic sophistication, and reads their telepathic union as the emotional and structural culmination of Rydra's effort to understand Babel-17 and achieve fuller communication. In her reading, telepathy becomes a metaphor for psychic growth, expanded self-understanding, human potential, and community. Stallings separately interprets the bond as bringing artistic and criminal perspectives together and connecting inner consciousness, imagination, and social reality.

=== Race, identity, and Afrofuturist context ===
Sandra Govan reads Babel-17 as deliberately constructing a future society in which racial identity remains visible but is not determinative of character function or capability. In her analysis of the novel, she highlights Rydra Wong, identified as Asian, and the psychiatrist Markus T'mwarba, identified as African, as figures through whom Delany embeds racial difference within the fabric of the narrative world rather than treating it as incidental. This approach contributes to what she describes as an insistent Black presence and a subtle Black perspective operating within speculative fiction more generally.

Within the novel, the Alliance–Invader war, Pan Africa, Rydra's poetry, and Babel-17's effects on self-awareness connect political conflict with questions of race and culture. Gregory Rutledge interprets these elements through what he calls a “transpositional cosmology,” linking the novel to the concerns of Black Power and the Black Arts Movement. Isiah Lavender similarly characterizes the fictional language Babel-17 as a linguistic “ethnoscape,” a setting in which language, technology, race, and social difference intersect. He reads its language as a form of coding that can express, limit, or transform perception, and connects Rydra's role as a mediator to questions of double consciousness and alienation.

These novel-specific readings are distinct from Delany's later reflections on race and speculative fiction. In a 1993 interview with Mark Dery, Delany described science fiction as most effective when working from the margins. He also connected the destruction of African cultural records under slavery with the difficulty of imagining Black futures.

=== Embodiment, labor, and sexuality ===
In Babel-17, the institutions of Customs and Transport organize the social world around different forms of knowledge and work. L. H. Stallings interprets them as embodiments of a division between science and art: Customs privileges analytical and human-centered systems, while Transport encompasses artistic practice, bodily transformation, and relations among human, nonhuman, living, and dead beings. Her reading of the corporate and discorporate workers treats both groups as contributing labor to the same machinery, challenging a clear boundary between life, death, body, and technology. The ship itself is described as a “thing that feels,” entering into a reciprocal relation in which it extends the crew members’ bodies while their bodies become part of the ship’s operation.

The navigator triple likewise makes relationship structure part of the ship's functioning. Stallings reads the arrangement as affective and sexual as well as technical: it depends on perception, communication, emotional connection, and the coordination of three distinct people, challenging monogamy as the assumed ethical model for intimate relationships. Buller and Rambo place the navigator triple and surgical body modification practices within a reading that questions whether familiar social conventions are universal. They interpret the characters' discomfort with a triple marriage as reflecting discomfort toward sexual lives outside accepted norms.

=== Genre, quest, and narrative form ===
Babel-17 combines the adventure conventions of space opera with a sustained inquiry into language and signs. William H. Hardesty III argues that its space-opera elements form a system of signs through which the novel comments ironically on its own genre. Rydra Wong's voyage consequently centers on the knowledge needed to understand an unfamiliar language, not the pursuit of adventure or a material prize. Buller and Rambo interpret the journey as a quest whose literal goal and symbolic meaning are both knowledge. George E. Slusser approaches the quest as an effort to establish communicable order through words and gain control of a language structure.

Although the novel includes military danger and action, it emphasizes problem-solving and investigation. Seth McEvoy characterizes its action as economical, with few prolonged battles or major digressions, while its dialogue advances the plot and develops character. He reads Rydra less as a conventional action hero than as an intellectual and linguistic investigator, making the effort to understand Babel-17 the source of the novel's central risks and discoveries.

== Reception ==
In the December 1966 issue of The Magazine of Fantasy & Science Fiction, Judith Merril reviewed Empire Star and Babel-17 together before broadening her discussion to Delany's first seven novels. She placed Delany, alongside Roger Zelazny and Thomas M. Disch, among the most promising new American science-fiction writers. Merril admired the mythic and poetic force of his early fiction, its powerful images, psychological insight, and ability to combine ideas about time, space, and mathematics. Her assessment was nevertheless qualified: she considered Delany's style still undeveloped and strongly derivative of Theodore Sturgeon and Cordwainer Smith. Though she found the books' surfaces confusing, she considered their underlying purpose clear and expressed eagerness to read more of Delany's work.

Babel-17 shared the 1966 Nebula Award for Best Novel with Daniel Keyes's Flowers for Algernon. It was also a finalist for the Hugo Award for Best Novel in 1967; the award went to Robert A. Heinlein's The Moon Is a Harsh Mistress.

Retrospective assessments have often valued the novel's ability to combine linguistic speculation with the scale and movement of space opera. David Pringle described it as a colorful and inventive example of the form. Jo Walton praised its mixture of adventure, character, and densely imagined social worlds, particularly Rydra Wong as a complex female protagonist in a 1966 science-fiction novel. Roy Arthur Swanson likewise emphasized the novel's pace, ingenuity, lyricism, semiotic play, and interest in varieties of human experience. In a later personal essay, Judith Tarr recalled the book as formative reading and characterized its central concern as humane, with Rydra's success depending on the people around her as much as on her individual ability.

The same ambition has also prompted reservations about the novel's linguistic premises and narrative execution. Walter E. Meyers considered it richly inventive and well written while finding a number of its linguistic details technically mistaken; he judged it less successful than Jack Vance's The Languages of Pao. CD Covington similarly found the central idea interesting, implausible, and effectively executed, while questioning its assumptions about universal translation and information density. Bogi Takács praised the prose, social imagination, world-building, and matter-of-fact diversity, but criticized the use of Hungarian as an example language in the novel and found the spy-thriller plot comparatively disappointing. Luke Brown also praised the future culture, Rydra, and relationship structures, while faulting occasional overindulgence in the prose and a final act weakened by exposition, contrivance, and coincidence.
