= Matt Glaser =

American bluegrass and jazz violinist

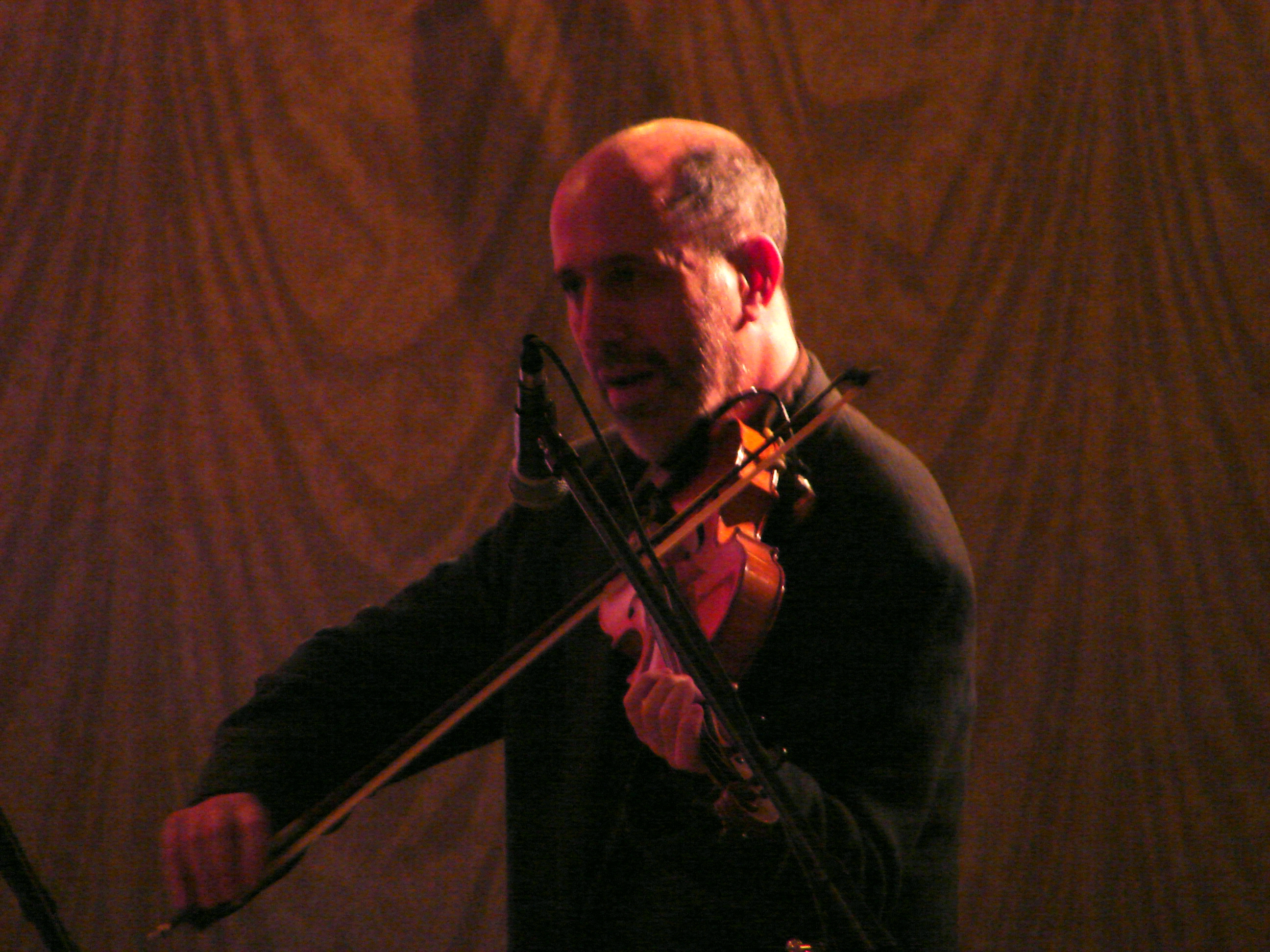
- Glaser in 2006, Photo: Bob Travis

Background information
- Genres: Jazz, bluegrass
- Occupations: Musician, educator
- Instrument: Violin

Matt Glaser is an American jazz and bluegrass violinist. He served as the chair of the string department at the Berklee College of Music for more than twenty-five years. He is now the founder and artistic director of Berklee's American Roots Music Program.

== Biography ==
Glaser holds an M.Mus. degree from Tufts University. He has performed at Carnegie Hall with Stephane Grappelli and Yo-Yo Ma, and at the Boston Globe Jazz Festival with Gunther Schuller. He has also performed with Bob Dylan, Ralph Stanley, Lee Konitz, David Grisman, Mark O'Connor, Andy Statman, Jamey Haddad, Jay Ungar, Bruce Molsky, Darol Anger, Art Baron, and the International String Quartet Congress.

He is featured on the Grammy Award–winning soundtrack for Ken Burns's 1990 The Civil War documentary and the soundtrack for the 1978 film King of the Gypsies. He served on the board of advisors for Ken Burns's 2001 Jazz documentary and appears as a narrator in the film.

In 2013, he won the Artist Teacher Award from the American String Teachers Association (ASTA). Past recipients include Joseph Szigeti, Pablo Casals, Isaac Stern, Yehudi Menuhin, Dorothy DeLay, and Ivan Galamian.

In addition to founding his own musical group, called the Wayfaring Strangers (featuring Tony Trischka, Laszlo Gardony, and Tracy Bonham), he has been a member of the Central Park Sheiks, the New York Bluegrass All-Stars, and Fiddle Fever. He has recorded an album with fellow fiddle player Kenny Kosek and he has appeared on numerous other recordings.

He has authored two books: Jazz Violin and Jazz Chord Studies for Violin, and an instructional video, Swingin' Jazz Violin.

Glaser lives in Somerville, Massachusetts. His notable students include Casey Driessen, Sarina Suno and Mads Tolling.

== Central Park Sheiks ==
The Central Park Sheiks were a mixed influence band that formed in the early 1970s and released a single LP, Honeysuckle Rose. The band members included Bob Hipkins, Matt Glaser, Richard Lieberson, Bert Lee, and John Caruso. Marty Confurious replaced Caruso in the bands later years. The style they are most often associated with is urban and western acoustic swing music, but they played a great deal of country and folk inflected tunes, as well as original music by Hipkins, Lee and Lieberson. The band toured many colleges in the Eastern seaboard during their years together, and had a very successful final performance at New York's Loeb Student Center in New York. While not widely known outside of the eclectic music scene, the band achieved notoriety in Japan. The band was also associated with Samuel R Delany's Heavenly Breakfast. because band member Bert Lee was part of Delany's communal band in the sixties.

== Select discography ==
- Honeysuckle Rose (with Central Park Sheiks)
- Flatpicking Guitar Festival (with Central Park Sheiks)

With Skitch Henderson

- Swinging With Strings (Arbors)

== Bibliography ==
- Ear Training for Instrumentalists. Homespun, 1999
- Jazz Violin. (with Stephane Grappelli) Music Sales America, 1992
- Teach Yourself Bluegrass Fiddle. Music Sales America, 1999
- Berklee Practice Method: Violin. (with Mimi Rabson) Berklee Press, 2004
- Texas and Swing Fiddle. Homespun, 2004
- Vassar Clements - Fiddle: Bluegrass Masters Series. Music Sales America, 2008
- Bluegrass Fiddle and Beyond: Etudes and Ideas for the Modern Fiddler. Berklee Press, 2010
- Beyond Bluegrass Banjo. (with Dave Hollender) Berklee Press, 2011
- Beyond Bluegrass Mandolin. (with John McGann) Berklee Press, 2011
- Berklee Practice Method: Viola. (with Mimi Rabson) Berklee Press, 2013
- Berklee Practice Method: Cello. (with Mimi Rabson) Berklee Press, 2013
