= They Fly at Çiron =

1993 novel by Samuel R. Delany

- Dust-jacket from the first edition
- Author: Samuel R. Delany
- Cover artist: Olav Martin Kvern
- Language: English
- Genre: Science fiction
- Publisher: Incunabula
- Publication date: 1993
- Publication place: United States
- Media type: Print (hardback & paperback)
- Pages: 179
- ISBN: 0-9633637-0-0
- OCLC: 28640559
- Dewey Decimal: 813/.54 20
- LC Class: PS3554.E437 T48 1993

They Fly at Çiron is a 1993 science fiction novel by Samuel R. Delany, wholly rewritten and expanded from a novelette written in the 1960s.
