= Phallos (novella) =

Novel by Samuel Delany

- Cover from the 1st edition
- Author: Samuel R. Delany
- Cover artist: John Del Gaizo & Lawrence Alma-Tadema
- Language: English
- Genre: Historical
- Publisher: Bamberger Books
- Publication date: 2004
- Publication place: United States
- Media type: Print (Paperback)
- Pages: 95
- ISBN: 0-917453-41-7
- OCLC: 57233463

Phallos (2004) is a novella by American writer Samuel R. Delany, published by Bamberger Books. It was reissued by Wesleyan University Press in 2013.

Phallos takes the form of a modern online essay recounting the history and giving a synopsis of a nonexistent novel also called Phallos, set in the Mediterranean during the reign of Roman Emperor Hadrian.

== Plot summary ==
As does Delany's Return to Nevèrÿon series, Phallos uses a frame story — a double frame, in fact. First a brief trio of paragraphs tells of an African-American, Adrian Rome, whose adolescent encounter with the book leads to his adult attempt, a decade later, to find a copy. Finally he settles for an on-line synopsis posted by one Randy Pedarson of Moscow, Idaho. The second frame is more complex: it concerns the fictive editor Randy Pedarson, presumably of Moscow, and his relations with two graduate students, Binky and Phyllis, also enthusiasts of the novel, at the university there. According to Pedarson's posting, as far as Pedarson can tell, an anonymous gay pornographic novel, Phallos (one of Pederson's three favorites: the other two are John Preston's Mr. Benson and William Talsman’s The Gaudy Image, both of which are known for their better-than-average writing), was published in 1969 by Essex House of West Hollywood, California. While the anonymous introduction to that volume suggests that Phallos was known to numerous literary gay men of the past, from the 18th-century advocate of Greek beauty, Johanne Joaquim Winkelmann, through the 19th century Oxford aesthetician and novelist Walter Pater, to the historian John Addington Symonds (whose seven-volume The Renaissance in Italy [1875-86] acted as a sort of counterbalance to Pater’s brief single volume [of 1873/75], The Renaissance, still widely read and quoted today), and moving on to such characters as Baron Corvo (pseudonym of Frederick Rolfe) and sex researcher Havelock Ellis, Pederson concludes that all this is simply the kind of bogus folderol that accompanies so much of the pornography published in that licentious decade, as an attempt to legitimize it.

Pederson goes on to synopsize Phallos — a pornographic novella from which he omits the explicit sex but tells at least some of the plot; now and again, Pederson quotes from it, which gives the reader a sense of its style. That synopsis, along with the footnotes — some as extensive as five or six pages — provided by his friends, recent Ph.D.'s Binky and Phyllis, make up the novel within the novella, Phallos.

=== Fictional novel ===
Phallos proper begins with a Greek epigraph — the "Anaximander fragment," presumably the oldest piece of written Greek philosophy extant from the Ionian presocratics, dating from the last years of the 6th century BCE. This is glossed by a footnote from Binky, who, in four pages, gives his version of Nietzsche's, Hegel's, Heidegger's, and finally Sir Karl Popper's take on Anaximander, with a few potshots by Phyllis (virtually footnotes to the footnote).

Pederson reproduces Phallos’s whole first chapter. It serves as a prologue to the novel proper as well as to his own synopsis. Also, it introduces us to our narrator, Neoptolomus, the son of a gentleman farmer on the island of Syracuse, the ancient name for Sicily, who reads Heraclietos and can recite some of Aesop’s fables in Greek. His mother is a one-time Egyptian slave woman, freed long ago. When his parents are killed by a fever in his 17th year, Neoptolomus comes under the protection of a rich Roman merchant who keeps a summer villa in the area. The rich Roman takes young Neoptolomus to Rome and sponsors him as an officer in the Roman army and, on his release, asks him, in return, to travel to Egypt and help him acquire some lands across the Nile from the city of Hermopolis. The Roman Emperor Hadrian is visiting Hermopolis at the time, and Neoptolomus becomes involved with the murder of the emperor’s favorite, Antinous. At the temple of "a nameless god," whose priests control the lands across the river at Hir-wer, Neoptolomus learns that on the day of Antinous's death, bandits have broken into the temple and, from the statue of the god, stolen the "golden phallos, encrusted with jade, copper, and jewels" — phallos is Greek for the male member. This theft has thrown the whole religious system into chaos. Almost immediately Neoptolomus finds himself kidnapped by a bandit gang, whose leader is certainly the man who killed Antinous. The first third of the novella deals with Neoptolomus, his relation with the bandit chief, and the period before and after the bandit sells him to a scholar in Alexandria. The plot is interlarded — indeed, held together — by numerous gay sexual encounters. While Pederson mentions them, his synopsis omits much — indeed, most — of the explicit sexual description.

After several years of the hero's wanderings, the novel's middle third finds Neoptolomus back in Rome. Once more he is working for his Roman patron, now as a broker of warehouse space in his patron's several Roman warehouses. After his early education in the sex life of the desert and the barbarian outlands, Neoptolomus finds himself sampling the intricacies of civilized urban sex — as well as negotiating the complexities that arise for him as a gay man trying to have friendships with — and work among — straight men. His several attempts to retrieve the phallos are shown, from Rome to Byzantium, back to Syracuse, and even to the volcanic slopes of Mount Etna. The central third include a drugged Walpurgisnacht among the volcanic peaks and the sad history of a Roman street boy, Maximin, who Neoptolomus wrongly decides is trying to steal from him, though in reality he has been the victim of one of Neoptolomus's jealous lovers.

In the final third, years later an older and wiser Neoptolomus returns to Hermopolis, where he meets a young black African, Nivek, sent to the Temple of the nameless god, much as Neoptolomus had been, also to acquire rights to the land across the Nile at Hir-wer — which, since Antinous's death, Hadrian has transformed into the city of Antinoöpolis, now a shrine to the memory of the emperor's late lover, who has officially been declared a god. Here history would seem to repeat itself, only Neoptolomus is in a different role from the one he occupied as a youth. Through this switch in position, Neoptolomus comes to understand a great deal about some of the mysteries around his earlier visit to Hermopolis.

Soon, under the pleasures of his committed life-partnership with Nivek, Neoptolomus gives up his search for the phallos. Because of his success both in business and in life — and because they know how much energy in the past Neoptolomus has put into searching for the phallos — many of the couple's friends, however, including a poet, a Christian priest, and a horse-loving adventurer, assume the two, now successful merchants on their own, have secretly found it.

Nivek and Neoptolomus run into problems holding their annual orgies in their own summer villa in the Apennines above Rome — sometimes with their neighbors, sometimes with their guests. Though Neoptolomus and Nivek have given up the search for the phallos, because of their friends’ interest in that object they are almost as greatly plagued by its possible existence — or non-existence — as they were before. The novel concludes when Neoptolomus's rich Roman patron dies, and Neoptolomus and Nivek return to Syracuse to take over Neoptolmus's late father's lands, using some of the money that his patron has left him. Meanwhile, Neoptolomus has generously sponsored a young goatherd, Cronin, with a commission in the army, as Neoptolomus himself had been sponsored in his youth; and Nivek has just invited a sexually interesting farm worker, Aronk, to come and work for them — because he realizes that Neoptolomus finds him attractive. In a scene in which the two men embrace in an acceptance of the cyclic, yet unpredictable, nature of life, the novel proper ends. The commentary from the triptych of the editor and his friends, however, goes on. In another footnote Binky points out Pederson's tendency in his synopsis to downplay any racial tensions dramatized in the book. Phyllis has the last say, pointing out in her final note an equally misogynistic streak in Pederson's selection of the materials he has included (and, even more so, left out), so that the final word we read in the text is her accusation against Pedarson of subjecting his version of the book to a certain order of "castration".

== Publication history ==
The original 2004 edition of Phallos was published by small press Bamberger Books. The 2013 "enhanced and revised edition," published by Wesleyan University Press, was edited by Robert Reid-Pharr and includes scholarly essays by the editor, Steven Shaviro, Kenneth James, and Darieck Scott.

== Reception ==
In Literary Hub, Ian Dreiblatt recommends Phallos on a list of modern fictional works on the ancient world, praising Delany's use of "polyphonic form to exhilarating effect, foreshortening the distances between ancient character and modern reader while meditating on pursuit, mystique, textuality, and, indeed, dick."

== Sources ==
- Brown, Charles N.; William G. Contento. "The Locus Index to Science Fiction (2005)".
