= Empire Star =

Novel by Samuel Delany

- First edition
- Author: Samuel R. Delany
- Illustrator: Jack Gaughan
- Cover artist: Jack Gaughan
- Language: English
- Genre: Science fiction
- Publisher: Ace Books
- Publication date: 1966
- Publication place: United States
- Media type: Print (Paperback)
- Pages: 102 pp
- OCLC: 3735322

Empire Star is a 1966 science fiction novella by Samuel R. Delany. It is often published together with another book, most frequently (three times) with The Ballad of Beta-2. Delany hoped to have it first published as part of an Ace Double with Babel-17, but instead it was published with Tree Lord of Imeten by Tom Purdom. It was finally bundled with Babel-17 in a 2001 reprint.

The story revolves around the protagonist, Comet Jo, and a narrator named Jewel. Nominally a tale of Comet Jo’s coming-of-age, his education into galactic society (and as such can be considered a mini-Bildungsroman), his efforts to deliver an important message to Empire Star, and the attempt to bring an end to slavery, the story has several layered loops of events which run back upon themselves—and the concepts, layering, and ordering of the events are as important as the story itself.

== Plot summary ==
As the narrative opens, we meet Comet Jo at eighteen years of age. He has spent his entire life in a "simplex" society on Rhys, a satellite of a Jovian planet orbiting Tau Ceti. (At first it might seem that "simplex" means "simple" or "unintelligent," but after Jo's encounter with the "Geodesic Survey Station" at the latest, it will be clear the notion is much more complicated.) Jo comes upon the wreckage of a spacecraft and encounters two survivors. The first is quickly dying and asks Jo to bring an important message to Empire Star moments before dying. The other is a lifeform known as Jewel. Jewel is a tritovian in crystallized form, and in that state can easily view situations from several points of view, thus enabling narration from the point of view of the omniscient observer.

Jo quickly leaves Rhys in an attempt to deliver the message to Empire Star, and on his journey he meets several other characters along with a race of creatures known as the Lll. The Lll are incredible builders—not merely of structures, but of ecosystems, societies, and ethical systems. As such, they have been enslaved. However, in order to protect the Lll, the Empire has created a phenomenon known as “the sadness of the Lll”—any being who owns the Lll suffers from a constant, overpowering sadness. This sadness increases geometrically with each Lll owned and with how much each Lll builds, so it is only possible to own a few Lll at a time. Indeed, just being in the presence of the Lll is a heartbreaking experience for even non-owners, a lesson that Jo learns early in his travels.

The story then follows Jo over the next few months. Once he reaches a certain point in his maturity, knowledge, and ability to perceive events around him, the linear narrative stops and the reader is left with a few pages of important events not arranged in a strict order; by this point, the reader may have learned enough to sort out the tangle.

Along the way, several questions are raised, either explicitly or implicitly. What is the message that Comet Jo must deliver? Who is coming to free the Lll? Will the Lll ever actually be freed? Is the story a closed loop, or is there indeed an end (or at least a point at which events move on past the ones mentioned in the story)? Who, exactly, entered the Empire Star? How many of the events of the story are arranged by those people?

== Characters ==
- Comet Jo: Eighteen years old, the product of a simplex culture.
- Jewel: A tritovian (presumably a non-human life form) who spends most of the story in a passive, crystallized form. Jewel is also the narrator of the tale.
- Charona: The guardian of the gate to the spaceport, Charona and her pet 3-Dog are quite obviously a mythological reference to Charon and Cerberus. Charona is the first person in Empire Star to tell Jo about the concept of simplex/complex/multiplex. She turns out to be San Severina in her old age.
- San Severina: Owner of seven Lll—far more than any being has ever owned before—who must rebuild eight worlds (along with fifty-two civilizations and thirty-two thousand three hundred and fifty-seven complete and distinct ethical systems) ravaged by war. San Severina is Jo's first tutor in the ways of galactic society. She helps Jo to move past his simplex upbringing and sets him on the path to becoming a multiplex being.
- Oscar/The Lump: short for Linguistic Ubiquitous Multiplex, Lump is an artificial lifeform with a Lll-based consciousness and is Comet Jo's companion for much of the text. Towards the end of the story we learn that the Lll whose consciousness Lump is based on is none other than Muels Aranlyde. ("Muels Aranlyde" is an anagram of "Samuel R. Delany".) The LUMp said his use of "Oscar" was a literary allusion and since the person he originally claimed to be waiting for was Alfred Douglas, he is alluding to Oscar Wilde, Douglas's friend and lover.
- Ni Ty Lee: A young poet who seems to have experienced all that Jo, or anyone else for that matter, has experienced.
- The Princess: stowaway on a military vessel headed for Empire Star. She is two years younger than Jo when they first meet, but she turns out to be a young San Severina.

== Sources ==
- Tuck, Donald H. (1974). The Encyclopedia of Science Fiction and Fantasy. Chicago: Advent. p. 137. ISBN 0-911682-20-1.
