= Equinox (novel) =

1973 novel by Samuel R. Delany

- First edition (under original title)
- Author: Samuel R. Delany
- Original title: Tides of Lust
- Language: English
- Genre: Erotica
- Publisher: Lancer Books
- Publication date: 1973
- Publication place: United States
- Media type: Print (Paperback)
- Pages: 173 pp
- ISBN: 0-553-12796-9

Equinox is a 1973 novel by American writer Samuel R. Delany. His first published foray into explicitly sexual material, it tells of a series of erotic and violent encounters in a small American seaport following the arrival of an African-American sea captain. It is a non-science-fiction work, though with fantastic elements.

Peter Nicholls in The Encyclopedia of Science Fiction described the work as "serious in intent, though likely to be shocking to most readers in its evocation of the extremes of sadomasochism in imagery which is sometimes poetic and often disgusting -and so intended- perhaps as a Baudelairean ritual of passage".

== Publication history ==
Equinox was written contemporaneously with Dhalgren. Equinox is Delany's preferred title, but the book was originally released under the title The Tides of Lust, a compromise with the publisher, Lancer Books, who wanted to call it Tides of Eros.

In 1975 a translation into the French came out, published by Champ Libre as Vice Versa.

The book was first published in the UK in 1980 by Savoy Books of Manchester. 2000 copies were seized by the police (along with 3000 copies of the Charles Platt novel The Gas) and the rest of the printing withdrawn from booksellers. Following a prosecution one of Savoy's partners, David Britton, was sent to prison in May 1982.

When republished in the early 1980s, all ages of underage people who performed sexual acts were increased by 100; e.g. there were 109-year-old children in the prose.

A new American paperback edition was published in January 1994 by Masquerade Books, under the RhinocEros label.

== Synopsis ==
Equinox concerns the sexual and violent encounters, "the search for erogenous gratification of a diverse collection of people", that take place when an unnamed black sea captain docks his 72-foot boat the Scorpion at a small American seaport. The captain is accompanied by his dog Niger and two teenagers Gunner and Kirsten. In town, he meets Robby, a naive drifter; Catherine, a Countess; Proctor, an artist; Bull, the town sheriff (who is himself an active criminal) and his equally thuggish operative Nazi; and various low-life characters including the black and white twins (self described "rape artists") Nig and Dove.

A lost wallet is traced to its owner, the artist Jonathan Proctor. At his studio, Proctor tells the Captain the story of his life in picaresque episodes, culminating in his first encounter, many years before, with the bewitching Catherine. She is depicted as a kind of baleful Madonna: depraved, hypocritical, perversely saintlike. Proctor mobilises the Captain and the other characters in a kind of amorous military assault against her as a personification of religious double standards. In the novel's closing movement, the perpetrators of a sex crime are protected by their corrupt friends, while the innocent vagabond Robby is lynched in their place.

The novel contains many long and explicit sexual descriptions. These are polymorphous, bisexual, often involving multiple and underage partners, as well as urophilic and sadomasochistic elements.

As part of a leitmotif relating to the myth of Faust, the Captain is either likened to the Devil or supposed to be Satan himself. Though sexually rapacious, the Captain's character is sympathetic, and in his conduct and attitudes seen to be one of the least truly evil personages in the narrative.

== Sources ==
- Barbour, Douglas. Worlds Out Of Worlds: The SF Novels of Samuel R. Delany. Frome, Somerset, UK: Bran's Head Books Ltd., 1979. ISBN 978-0-905220-13-0.
- Brulotte, Gaétan and John Phillips. Encyclopedia of Erotic Literature. CRC Press, 2006, ISBN 1-57958-441-1.
- Clute, John and Peter Ncholls. The Encyclopedia of Science Fiction. New York: St. Martin's Griffin, 1993 (2nd edition 1995). ISBN 0-312-13486-X.
- Delany, Samuel R. Shorter Views: Queer Thoughts & the Politics of the Paraliterary. Wesleyan University Press, 1999. ISBN 0-8195-6369-2.
- Nicholls, Peter. The Encyclopedia of Science Fiction. London: Granada Publishing, 1979. ISBN 0-586-05380-8.
