= Bread and Wine: An Erotic Tale of New York =

1999 graphic novel by Samuel R. Delany and Mia Wolff

- Date: 1999
- No. of issues: 1
- Page count: 64 pages
- Publisher: Juno Books; Fantagraphics Books

Creative team
- Writers: Samuel R. Delany
- Artists: Mia Wolff

Original publication
- Language: English
- ISBN: 1-890451-02-9

Bread and Wine: An Erotic Tale of New York (also stylized as Bread & Wine) is a 1999 American graphic novel written by Samuel R. Delany with art by Mia Wolff. The book was reprinted by Fantagraphics Books in 2013 with an interview with Delany and Wolff. The introduction was written by Alan Moore. The updated 2025 edition includes a foreword written by Junot Diaz. A 2025 ComicsBeat review praised the writing and art: "on the basis of this book alone [Delany is] one of the great comics writers of the 20th century."

== Plot ==
An autobiographical graphic novel about a science-fiction writer meeting a homeless man and becoming partners.

== Literature ==
- Matsuuchi, Ann (2015). "'Happily Ever After': The Tragic Queer and Delany's Comic Book Fairy Tale". African American Review. 48 (3): 271–287. JSTOR 24589705.
