= Shorter Views =

- Cover of first edition paperback
- Author: Samuel R. Delany
- Language: English
- Genre: Non-fiction
- Publisher: Wesleyan University Press
- Publication date: 2000
- Publication place: United States
- Media type: Print (Paperback)
- Pages: xii, 464 pp
- ISBN: 0-8195-6369-2
- OCLC: 41564964
- Dewey Decimal: 814/.54 21
- LC Class: PS3554.E437 Z4756 1999

Shorter Views is a 2000 collection of essays on race, sexuality, science fiction, and the art of writing by author, professor, and critic Samuel R. Delany.
