= Silent Interviews =

- Cover of first edition paperback
- Author: Samuel R. Delany
- Language: English
- Genre: Non-fiction
- Publisher: Wesleyan University Press
- Publication date: 1995
- Publication place: United States
- Media type: Print (Paperback)
- Pages: 322 pp
- ISBN: 0-8195-6280-7
- OCLC: 28962786
- Dewey Decimal: 813/.54 20
- LC Class: PS3554.E437 Z476 1994

Silent Interviews: On Language, Race, Sex, Science Fiction, and Some Comics is a 1995 non-fiction collection of interviews with author, professor, and critic Samuel R. Delany.

The book was a finalist for the 1995 Hugo Award for Best Non-Fiction Book.
