= Triton (novel) =

1976 novel by Samuel R. Delany

Trouble on Triton
- Cover of the first edition
- Author: Samuel R. Delany
- Original title: Triton
- Cover artist: Mitchell Hooks
- Language: English
- Genre: Science fiction
- Publisher: Bantam Books
- Publication date: 1976
- Publication place: United States
- Media type: Print (hardback & paperback)
- Pages: 369
- ISBN: 0-553-22979-6
- OCLC: 14151051

Trouble on Triton: An Ambiguous Heterotopia (1976) is a science fiction novel by American writer Samuel R. Delany. It was nominated for the 1976 Nebula Award for Best Novel, and was shortlisted for a retrospective James Tiptree, Jr. Award in 1995. It was originally published under the shorter title Triton.

Delany has said that Trouble on Triton was written partly in dialogue with Ursula K. Le Guin's anarchist science fiction novel The Dispossessed, whose subtitle was An Ambiguous Utopia. It is also loosely linked to other books by him (particularly Neveryóna) in its references to "the modular calculus", a vaguely described future mathematics that would analyze analogies, fictional constructs, and possibly human personalities. The most recent U.S. edition from Wesleyan University Press (1996) has a foreword by the postmodern novelist Kathy Acker, focusing on Trouble on Triton as Orphic fiction.

== Plot introduction ==
As the subtitle implies, the novel offers several conflicting perspectives on the concept of utopia. Utopia literally means "good place" or "no place". Delany takes the term heterotopia from the writings of philosopher Michel Foucault. Literally, heterotopia means "other place" or "a place of differences". Foucault uses the term to designate spaces outside everyday fixed institutional and social spaces, for example trains, motels and cemeteries. In the novel's future Solar System, Neptune's moon Triton supports one of several human societies independent from Earth, which has developed along radically libertarian lines in some ways: although a representative government exists, it has virtually no power to regulate private behavior, and citizens may choose to live in an area where no laws apply at all. Technology provides for a high degree of self-modification, so that one can change one's physical appearance, gender, sexual orientation, and even specific patterns of likes and dislikes.

== Plot summary ==
The novel examines how Triton's freedoms and customs are perceived by the main characters, particularly Bron Helstrom, a young man who has previously worked on Mars as a prostitute. The society of Mars is far harsher than that of Triton, and it has evidently influenced Bron's personality. He is self-absorbed, often lacks insight about himself and others, and has great difficulty with personal relationships. Although the civilization of Triton offers everything that he could reasonably want, he is unhappy with his life, out of harmony with those around him, and continually looking for others to blame whenever things go wrong.

As the novel continues, political tensions between Triton and Earth lead to a destructive interplanetary war. This is mainly used as the backdrop for Bron's (ultimately disastrous) relationship with a brilliant young woman known as the Spike, but Delany speculates about how an interplanetary war might actually unfold.

== Reception ==
Although dissatisfied with the novel's "abrupt" conclusion, Richard A. Lupoff praised Triton as "a thoroughly absorbing, highly rewarding reading experience. . . . a noble and fascinating experiment [that] speaks well for the author." In a 2008 review for Tor.com, Jo Walton praises Trouble on Triton for being a “personal is political” novel, which was not typical for its contemporaries in the science fiction genre.

== Connections to other works ==
Trouble on Triton is not to be confused with the 1941 Henry Kuttner novel or the 1954 Alan E. Nourse novel Trouble on Titan.

The title of the novel was inspired by Leonard Bernstein's 1952 opera, Trouble in Tahiti. Fred Pohl, the editor at Bantam, made Delany shorten the title to Triton to avoid confusion.

Trouble on Triton contains the first two parts of the five-part series "Some Informal Remarks Toward the Modular Calculus", which continues in several volumes of the Return to Nevèrÿon series. The novel as a whole is Part One, while Part Two is the novel's second appendix.

Bron's home city of Bellona on Mars shares its name with the Bellona where Delany's other novel Dhalgren is set.

Cover of 1996 Wesleyan paperback edition.

Several plot elements in Trouble on Triton have similar corresponding elements in Delany's Stars in My Pocket Like Grains of Sand.

Trouble on Triton is set in the same universe as Delany's short story "Time Considered as a Helix of Semi-Precious Stones", included in his collection Aye, and Gomorrah, and other stories.

The complex game vlet, which Bron observes the play of, is inspired by the Joanna Russ short story "A Game of Vlet", found in her collection The Zanzibar Cat.
