= Samuel R. Delany =

American author, critic, and academic (born 1942)

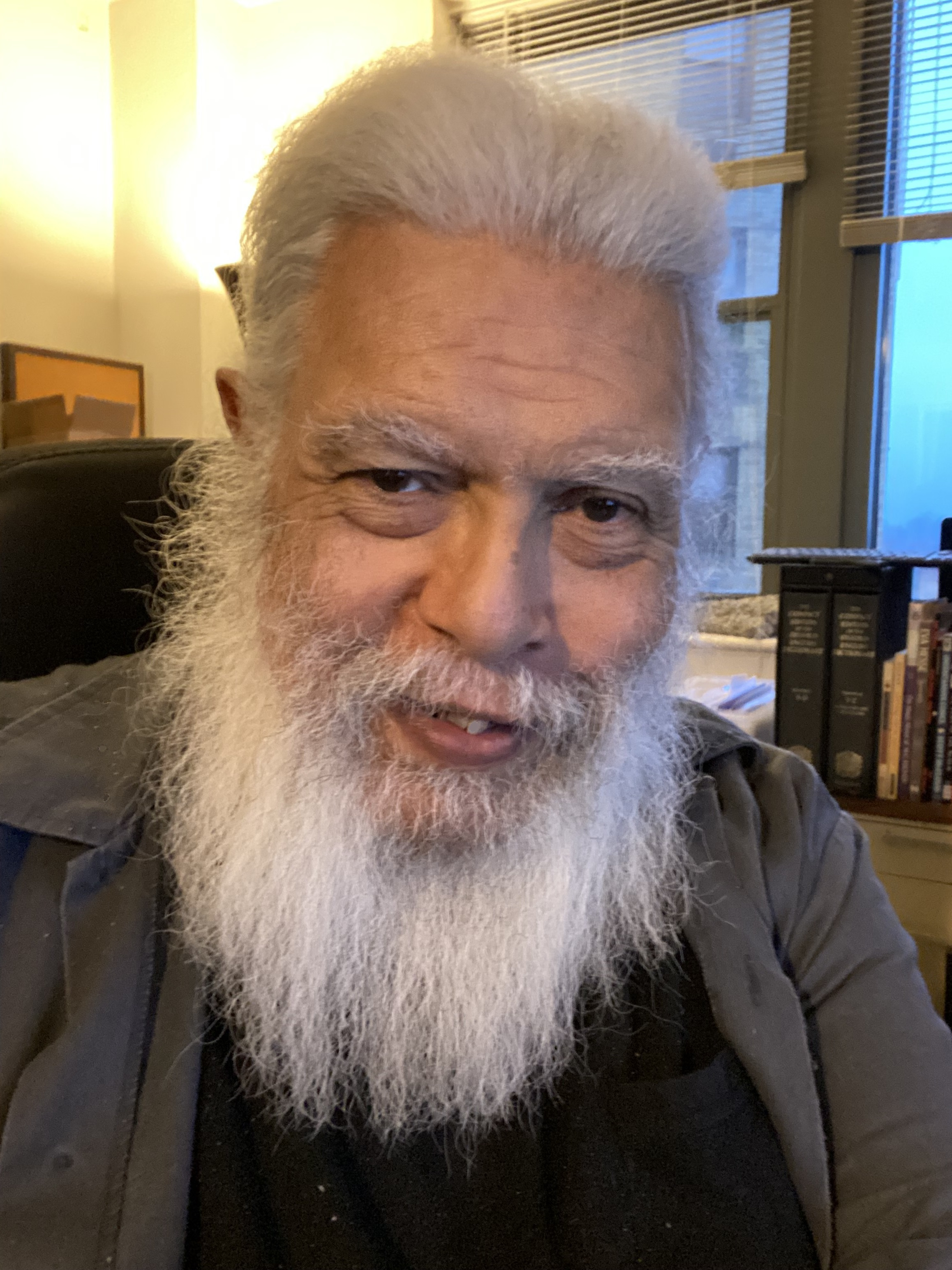
- Delany in 2022
- Born: Samuel Ray Delany Jr. April 1, 1942 (age 84); Harlem, New York City, U.S.
- Education: City College of New York
- Occupations: Writer; editor; professor; literary critic
- Spouse: Marilyn Hacker (m. 1961; div. 1980)
- Partner: Dennis Rickett (1991–present)
- Children: Iva Hacker-Delany
- Relatives: Henry Beard Delany (grandfather); Sadie Delany (aunt); Bessie Delany (aunt)
- Writing career
- Pen name: K. Leslie Steiner, S. L. Kermit
- Period: 1962–present
- Genres: Science fiction, fantasy, autobiography, creative nonfiction, erotic literature, literary criticism
- Subjects: Science fiction, lesbian and gay studies, eroticism
- Notable works: Babel-17, Hogg, The Einstein Intersection, Nova, Dhalgren, The Motion of Light in Water, Dark Reflections
- Notable awards: Nebula Award (4); Hugo Award (2); Stonewall Book Award (1); Brudner Prize; Lambda Award (2); Inkpot Award (1); Anisfield-Wolf Book Award; World Fantasy Award
- Movements: New Wave, Afrofuturism
- Website: samueldelany.com

Samuel R. Delany (/dəˈleɪni/, də-LAY-nee; born April 1, 1942) is an African-American writer and literary critic. His work includes fiction (especially science fiction), memoir, criticism, and essays on science fiction, literature, sexuality, and society.

His fiction includes Babel-17, The Einstein Intersection (winners of the Nebula Award for 1966 and 1967, respectively), Hogg, Nova, Dhalgren, the Return to Nevèrÿon series, and Through the Valley of the Nest of Spiders. His nonfiction includes Times Square Red, Times Square Blue, About Writing, and eight books of essays. He has won four Nebula Awards and two Hugo Awards, and he was inducted into the Science Fiction and Fantasy Hall of Fame in 2002.

From January 1975 to May 2015, he was a professor of English, Comparative Literature, and/or Creative Writing at SUNY Buffalo, SUNY Albany, the University of Massachusetts Amherst, and Temple University.

In 1997, he won the Kessler Award; further, in 2010, he won the third J. Lloyd Eaton Lifetime Achievement Award in Science Fiction from the academic Eaton Science Fiction Conference at UCR Libraries. The Science Fiction Writers of America named him the organization's 30th SFWA Grand Master in 2013, and in 2016, he was inducted into the New York State Writers Hall of Fame. Delany received the 2021 Anisfield-Wolf Lifetime Achievement Award. On October 11, 2025, Delany was inducted into the American Academy of Arts and Sciences.

== Early life ==
Samuel Ray Delany Jr. was born and raised in Harlem. His mother, Margaret Carey (Boyd) Delany (1916–1995), was a clerk in the New York Public Library system. His father, Samuel Ray Delany Sr. (1906–1960), ran the Levy & Delany Funeral Home on 7th Avenue in Harlem from 1938 until his death in 1960. The family lived in the top two floors of a three-story private house between five- and six-story Harlem apartment buildings.

Delany was born into an accomplished and ambitious family of the African-American upper class. His grandfather, Henry Beard Delany (1858–1928), was born into slavery, but after emancipation received education and became a priest and the first black bishop of the Episcopal Church. Civil rights pioneers Sadie and Bessie Delany were among his paternal aunts. (He drew from their lives as the basis for characters Elsie and Corry in "Atlantis: Model 1924", the opening novella in his semi-autobiographical collection Atlantis: Three Tales.) Other notable family members include his aunt, Harlem Renaissance poet Clarissa Scott Delany, and his uncle, judge Hubert Thomas Delany.

Delany attended the private Dalton School under a scholarship, and, from 1951 through 1956, spent summers at Camp Woodland in Phoenicia, New York. He studied at the merit-based Bronx High School of Science, during which he was selected to attend Camp Rising Sun, the Louis August Jonas Foundation's international summer scholarship program. Delany's first published short story, "Salt", appeared in Dynamo, Bronx Science's literary magazine, in 1960.

Delany's father died from lung cancer in October 1960. The following year, in August 1961, Delany married poet and translator Marilyn Hacker, and the couple settled in New York's East Village neighborhood at 629 East 5th Street. Hacker was working as an assistant editor at Ace Books, and her intervention helped Delany become a published science fiction author by the age of 20. He had finished writing his first novel (The Jewels of Aptor, published in 1962) at the age of 19, shortly after dropping out of the City College of New York after attending for one semester.

== Career ==
His next work was the trilogy The Fall of the Towers, followed by The Ballad of Beta-2 and Babel-17; he described his writing in this period, and his marriage to Hacker, in his memoir The Motion of Light in Water. In 1966, while Hacker remained in New York, Delany took a five-month trip to France, England, Italy, Greece, and Turkey. During this period, he wrote The Einstein Intersection. He drew on these locales in several works, including Nova and the short stories "Aye, and Gomorrah" and "Dog in a Fisherman's Net". These works received critical praise: Algis Budrys called Delany a genius and poet and listed him with J. G. Ballard, Brian W. Aldiss, and Roger Zelazny as "an earthshaking new kind" of writer, while Judith Merril labeled him "TNT (The New Thing)". Babel-17 and The Einstein Intersection won the Nebula Award for Best Novel in 1966 and 1967, respectively.

"The Star-Pit", Delany's first professional short story, was published by Frederick Pohl in the February 1967 issue of Worlds of Tomorrow, and he placed three more in other magazines that year. In 1968, he published four more short stories (including "Time Considered as a Helix of Semi-Precious Stones", winner of the Hugo Award for Best Short Story in 1970) and Nova. This was published by Doubleday, marking Delany's departure from Ace; it was his last science fiction novel until Dhalgren in 1975.

Weeks after Delany's return, he and Hacker began to live separately. Delany played and lived communally for five months on the Lower East Side with the Heavenly Breakfast, a folk-rock band whose other members were Susan Schweers, Steven Greenbaum (also known as Wiseman), and Bert Lee (later a founding member of the Central Park Sheiks). Delany wrote a memoir of his experiences with the band and communal life, which was eventually published as Heavenly Breakfast (1979). After he and Hacker briefly came together again, she moved to San Francisco. On New Year's Eve in 1968, Delany joined her; they then moved to London. In the summer of 1971, Delany returned to New York, where he lived at the Albert Hotel in Greenwich Village.

In 1972, Delany directed a short film entitled The Orchid (originally titled The Science Fiction Film in the Latter Twentieth Century), produced by Barbara Wise. Shot in 16 mm with color and sound, the production also employed David Wise, Adolfas Mekas, and was scored by John Herbert McDowell. That November, Delany was a visiting writer at Wesleyan University's Center for the Humanities.

That year, Delany wrote two issues of the comic book Wonder Woman, during a controversial period when the lead character abandoned her superpowers and became a secret agent. Delany scripted issues No. 202 and No. 203 of the series. He was initially supposed to write a six-issue story arc that would culminate in a battle over an abortion clinic, but the story arc was canceled after Gloria Steinem led a lobbying effort protesting the removal of Wonder Woman's powers, a change predating Delany's involvement. Scholar Ann Matsuuchi concluded that Steinem's feedback was "conveniently used as an excuse" by DC management.

From December 1972 to December 1974, Delany and Hacker lived in Marylebone, London. During this period, Delany began working with sexual themes in earnest and wrote two pornographic works, Equinox (originally published as The Tides of Lust) and Hogg, which was unpublishable at the time due to its transgressive content; it did not find print until 1995.

Delany's eleventh novel, Dhalgren, was published in 1975 to, alternately, literary acclaim (from both inside and outside the science fiction community) and derision (mostly from within the community). It sold more than one million copies. After a lengthy exchange of letters with Leslie Fiedler, Delany returned to the United States at Fiedler's behest to teach at the University at Buffalo as Visiting Butler Professor of English for the spring 1975 semester. That summer he returned to New York City.

Though he published two more major science fiction novels (Triton and Stars in My Pocket Like Grains of Sand) in the decade following Dhalgren, Delany began to work in fantasy and science fiction criticism. Beginning with The Jewel-Hinged Jaw (1977), a collection of critical essays that applied then-nascent literary theory to science fiction studies, he published several books of criticism, interviews, and essays. He was also a visiting fellow at the University of Wisconsin–Milwaukee in 1977 and the University at Albany in 1978. His main literary project through the late 1970s and 1980s was Return to Nevèrÿon, a four-volume series of sword and sorcery tales.

In 1987, Delany was a visiting fellow at Cornell University. The next year, he became a professor of comparative literature at the University of Massachusetts Amherst. He held this post for 11 years before spending a year and a half as an English professor at the University at Buffalo.

Delany's works in the 1990s included They Fly at Çiron, a rewritten and expanded version of an unpublished short story he had written in 1962, and his last novel in either the science fiction or fantasy genres for many years. He also published his novel The Mad Man and several essay collections, including Times Square Red, Times Square Blue (1999), a pair of essays in which Delany drew on personal experience to examine the relationship between the effort to redevelop Times Square and the public sex lives of working-class men in New York City. Delany received the Bill Whitehead Award for Lifetime Achievement from Publishing Triangle in 1993; he has described this as the award of which he is proudest.

After an invited stay at the artist's community Yaddo, he moved to the English Department of Temple University in January 2001, where he taught until his retirement in April 2015. In 2007, Delany was the subject of a documentary film, The Polymath, or, The Life and Opinions of Samuel R. Delany, Gentleman, directed by Fred Barney Taylor. The film debuted on April 25 at the 2007 Tribeca Film Festival, and in 2008, it tied for Jury Award for Best Documentary at the International Philadelphia Lesbian and Gay Film Festival. Also in 2007, Delany was the April "calendar boy" in the "Legends of the Village" calendar put out by Village Care of New York. In 2008, his novel Dark Reflections was a winner of the Stonewall Book Award.

In 2010, Delany was one of five judges (along with Andrei Codrescu, Sabina Murray, Joanna Scott and Carolyn See) for the National Book Awards fiction category.

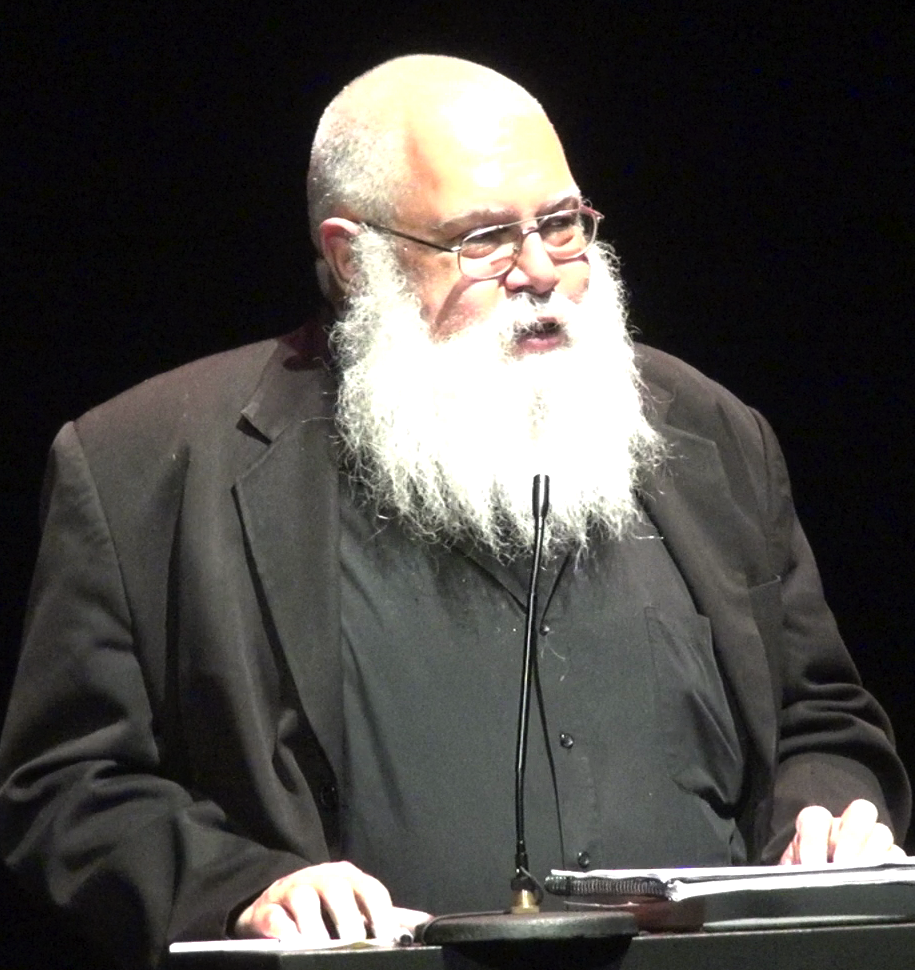
At a reading at The Kitchen in June 2011

His science fiction novel Through the Valley of the Nest of Spiders was published by Magnus Books on his birthday in 2012. In 2013 he received the Brudner Prize from Yale University, for his contributions to gay literature. The same year, Delany's friend Robert Morales, a comic book writer and his planned literary executor, died. He served as Critical Inquiry Visiting Professor at the University of Chicago during the winter quarter of 2014. In 2015, the year Delany retired from teaching at Temple University, the Caribbean Philosophical Association awarded him its Nicolás Guillén Lifetime Achievement Award.

Since 2018, his archive has been housed at the Beinecke Library at Yale, where it is currently being organized. Before that time, his papers were housed at the Howard Gotlieb Archival Research Center.

== Personal life ==
As a child, Delany envied children with nicknames. He took one for himself on the first day of a new summer camp, Camp Woodland, at the age of 11, by answering "Everybody calls me Chip!" when asked his name. Decades later, Frederik Pohl called him "a person who is never addressed by his friends as Sam, Samuel or any other variant of the name his parents gave him."

Delany's name is one of the most misspelled in science fiction, having been misspelled on more than 60 occasions in reviews. His publisher Doubleday misspelled his surname as "Delaney" on the title page of Driftglass, as did the organizers of Balticon in 1982 where Delany was guest of honor.

Delany has identified as gay since adolescence. Despite this, Delany spent 19 years married to poet/translator Marilyn Hacker, who was aware of Delany's orientation and has identified as a lesbian since their divorce.

Delany and Hacker had one child in 1974, Iva Hacker-Delany, now a physician.

In 1991, Delany entered a committed, nonexclusive relationship with Dennis Rickett, previously a homeless book vendor. Their courtship is chronicled in the graphic memoir Bread and Wine: An Erotic Tale of New York (1999), a collaboration with the writer and artist Mia Wolff.

Delany is an atheist.

Delany's papers are archived at Yale University.

== Themes ==
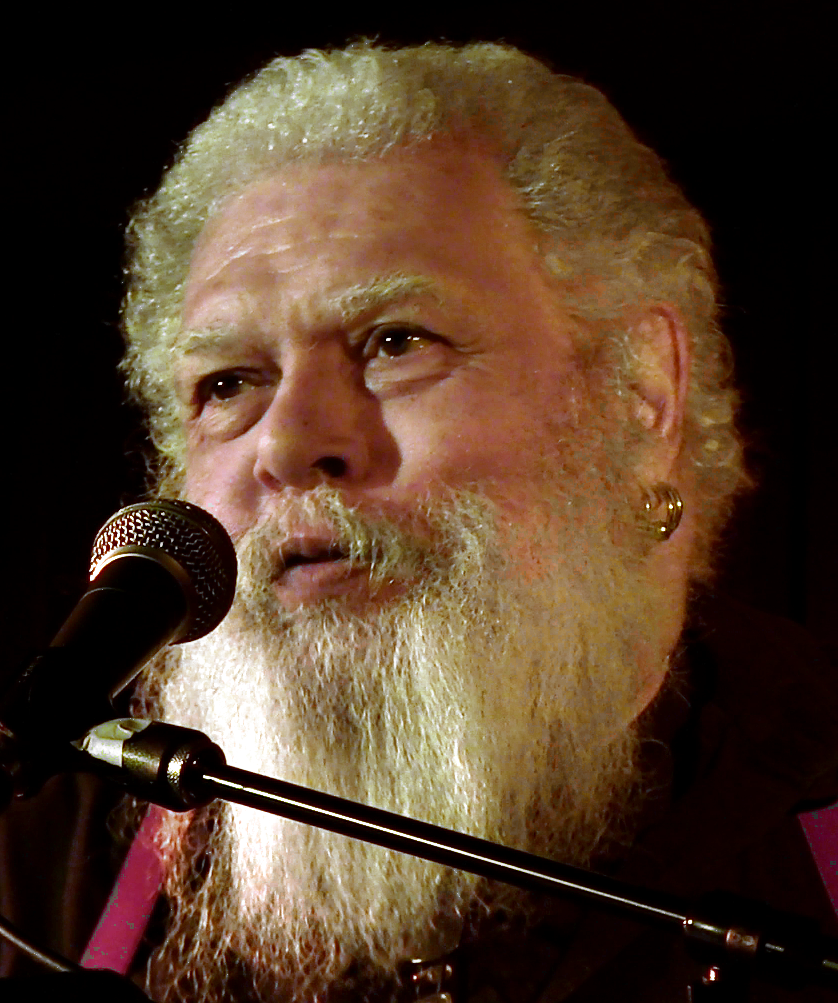
Delany at a reading in 2015.

Jewels, reflection, and refraction – not just the imagery but reflection and refraction of text and concepts – are also strong themes and metaphors in Delany's work. Titles such as The Jewels of Aptor, The Jewel-Hinged Jaw, "Time Considered as a Helix of Semi-Precious Stones", Driftglass, and Dark Reflections, along with the optic chain of prisms, mirrors, and lenses worn by several characters in Dhalgren, are a few examples of this; as in "We (...) move on a rigorous line" a ring is nearly obsessively described at every twist and turn of the plot. Reflection and refraction in narrative are explored in Dhalgren and take center stage in his Return to Nevèrÿon series.

Delany's novella "We, in Some Strange Power's Employ, Move on a Rigorous Line" (originally titled "Lines of Power") is highlighted by scholar Jason Haslam as being an early example of climate fiction, as it presents "a post-petroleum world where an international corporation provides power to everyone on Earth."

Following the 1968 publication of Nova, there was not only a large gap in Delany's published work (after releasing eight novels and a novella between 1962 and 1968, his published output virtually stopped until 1973), there was also a notable addition to the themes found in the stories published after that time. It was at this point that Delany began dealing extensively with sexual themes. Dhalgren and Stars in My Pocket Like Grains of Sand include several sexually explicit passages, and several of his books such as Equinox (originally published as The Tides of Lust, a title that Delany does not endorse), The Mad Man, Hogg and Phallos can be considered pornography, a label Delany himself uses.

Novels such as Triton and the thousand-plus pages making up his four-volume Return to Nevèrÿon series explored in detail how sexuality and sexual attitudes relate to the socioeconomic underpinnings of a primitive – or, in Triton's case, futuristic – society. Even in works with no science fiction or fantasy content to speak of, such as Atlantis: Three Tales, The Mad Man, and Hogg, Delany pursued these questions by creating vivid pictures of New York and other American cities, now in the Jazz Age, now in the first decade of the AIDS epidemic, New York private schools in the 1950s, as well as Greece and Europe in the 1960s, and – in Hogg – generalized small-town America. Phallos details the quest for happiness and security by a gay man from the island of Syracuse in the second-century reign of the Emperor Hadrian. Dark Reflections is a contemporary novel, dealing with themes of repression, old age, and the writer's unrewarded life.

Writer and academic C. Riley Snorton has addressed Triton's thematic engagement with gender, sexual, and racial difference and how their accommodations are instrumentalized in the state and institutional maintenance of social relations. Despite the novel's infinite number of subject positions and identities available through technological intervention, Snorton argues that Delany's proliferation of identities "take[s] place within the context of increasing technologically determined biocentrism, where bodies are shaped into categories-cum-cartographies of (human) life, as determined by socially agreed-upon and scientifically mapped genetic routes." Triton questions social and political imperatives towards anti-normativity insofar that these projects do not challenge but actually reify the constrictive categories of the human. In his book Afro-Fabulations, Tavia Nyong'o makes a similar argument in his analysis of The Einstein Intersection. Citing Delany as a Queer theorist, Nyong'o highlights the novella's "extended study of the enduring power of norms, written during the precise moment – 'the 1960s' – when antinormative, anti-systemic movements in the United States and worldwide were at their peak." Like Triton, The Einstein Intersection features characters that exist across a range of differences across gender, sexuality, and ability. This proliferation of identities "takes place within a concerted effort to sustain a gendered social order and to deliver a stable reproductive futurity through language" in the Lo society's caging of the non-functional "kages" who are denied language and care. Both Nyong'o and Snorton connect Delany's work with Sylvia Wynter's "genres of being human", underscoring Delany's sustained thematic engagement with difference, normativity, and their potential subversions or reifications, and placing him as an important interlocutor in the fields of Queer theory and Black studies.

The Mad Man, Phallos, and Dark Reflections are linked in minor ways. The beast mentioned at the beginning of The Mad Man graces the cover of Phallos.

== Awards and recognition ==
- 1985: Pilgrim Award, presented by the Science Fiction Research Association for Lifetime Achievement in the field of science fiction scholarship
- 1997: David R. Kessler award for LGBTQ Studies at CLAGS: The Center for LGBTQ Studies
- 2002: Inducted into the Science Fiction and Fantasy Hall of Fame
- 2010: J. Lloyd Eaton Lifetime Achievement Award in Science Fiction from the academic Eaton Science Fiction Conference at UCR Libraries
- 2012: Brudner Prize for contributions to LGBT studies and LGBT communities, awarded by Lesbian, Gay, Bisexual, and Transgender Studies (LGBTS) at Yale University
- 2013: Science Fiction Writers of America named him its 30th SFWA Grand Master
- 2016: Inducted into the New York State Writers Hall of Fame
- 2021: Sir Arthur Clarke Imagination in Service to Society Award for Outstanding Contributions to Fiction, Criticism and Essays on Science Fiction, Literature and Society by the Arthur C. Clarke Foundation
- 2021: Anisfield-Wolf Lifetime Achievement Award
- 2022: World Fantasy Award, Lifetime Achievement
- 2022: Lambda Literary Award, LGBTQ Erotica
- 2022: Delany was featured in the PBS television documentary series Articulate
- 2024: Guest of honor at the 2024 Sturgeon Symposium at the J. Wayne and Elsie M. Gunn Center for the Study of Science Fiction, "Stars in Our Pockets: Celebrating Samuel R. Delany"
- 2024: MAPACA Divine Impact Award

== Works ==
=== Fiction ===
==== Novels ====
Name	Published	ISBN	Notes
The Jewels of Aptor	1962	978-1-48370-471-5	Published as Ace-Double F-173 together with Second Ending by James White
Captives of the Flame	1963	978-1-51838-699-2	Published as Ace-Double F-199 together with The Psionic Menace by John Brunner, republished as the more definitive Out of the Dead City included in omnibus edition: The Fall of the Towers
The Towers of Toron	1964	978-0-57511-914-7	Published as Ace-Double F-261 together with The Lunar Eye by Robert Moore Williams, included in omnibus edition: The Fall of the Towers
City of a Thousand Suns	1965	978-0-57511-915-4	Published by Ace Books as F-322, included in omnibus edition: The Fall of the Towers
The Ballad of Beta-2	1965	978-0-83982-393-3	Published as Ace-Double M-121 together with Alpha Yes, Terra No! by Emil Petaja; Nebula Award nominee, 1965
Empire Star	1966	978-0-37570-669-1	Published as Ace-Double M-139 together with The Tree Lord of Imeten by Tom Purdom
Babel-17	1966	978-0-57509-420-8	Published by Ace Books as F-388, Nebula Award winner, 1966; Hugo Award nominee, 1967
The Einstein Intersection	1967	978-0-81956-336-1	Published by Ace Books as F-427, Nebula Award winner, 1967; Hugo Award nominee, 1968
Nova	1968	0-553-10031-9	Hugo Award nominee, 1969
The Tides of Lust	1973	0-86130-016-5	Published by Lancer Books as #71344, later reprinted under Delany's preferred title Equinox (1994), 1-56333-157-8.
Dhalgren	1975	0-553-14861-3	Nebula Award nominee, 1975; Locus Award nominee, 1976
Triton	1976	0-553-12680-6	Republished as Trouble on Triton in 1996 by Wesleyan University Press; Nebula Award nominee, 1976
Empire	1978	0-425-03900-5	With Howard Chaykin; Graphic novel Published by Byron Preiss/Berkley Windhover
Stars in My Pocket Like Grains of Sand	1984	0-553-05053-2	Locus Award nominee, 1985; Arthur C. Clarke Award nominee, 1987
They Fly at Çiron	1993	0-9633637-1-9	
The Mad Man	1994	1-56333-193-4	
Hogg	1995	0-932511-91-0	
Phallos	2004	0-917453-41-7	
Dark Reflections	2007	0-7867-1947-8	Stonewall Book Award winner, 2008; Lambda Award nominee, 2007
Through the Valley of the Nest of Spiders	2012	978-1-59350-203-4	Chapter 90 was inadvertently left out by the publisher, and was later published in Sensitive Skin magazine Since then Delany has self-published a corrected edition on Amazon with a new cover by Mia Wolff, the missing chapter, and many cosmetic corrections.
The Atheist in the Attic	2018	978-1-62963-440-1	Novella; includes essay "Racism and Science Fiction", "'Discourse in an Older Sense': Outspoken Interview", and Bibliography
Voyage, Orestes! : [A Surviving Novel Fragment].	2019	978-0-91745-344-1	Surviving fragment of a 1,056 page novel that Delany began in 1960. With introduction from Kenneth James.
Shoat Rumblin: His Sensations and Ideas	2020	979-8-65427-879-1	
Big Joe	2021	978-1-96587-418-9	Illustrated by Drake Carr and Sabrina Bockler. Published by Inpatient Press; Lambda Literary Award winner, LGBTQ Erotica, 2022
This Short Day of Frost and Sun	2022–		Serially published in The Georgia Review from Summer 2022

==== Return to Nevèrÿon series ====
Name	Published	ISBN	Notes
Tales of Nevèrÿon	1979	0-553-12333-5	Locus Award nominee, 1980; National Book Award for Science Fiction finalist, 1980
Neveryóna	1983	0-553-01434-X	Novel
Flight from Nevèrÿon	1985	0-553-24856-1	Novellas
The Bridge of Lost Desire	1987	0-87795-931-5	Novellas; Revised as Return to Nevèrÿon (1994), 0-8195-6278-5

==== Short stories ====
Story	First Publication Date	Awards	Drift- glass (1971)	Distant Stars (1981), illustrated, 0-553-01336-X	The Complete Nebula Award-Winning Fiction (1983), 0-553-25610-6	Driftglass/ /Starshards (1993), 0-586-21422-4	Atlantis: Three Tales (1995), 0-8195-5283-6	Aye, and Gomorrah, and other stories (2003), 0-375-70671-2
"Salt"	1960 in Dynamo							
"The Star Pit"	Feb 1967 in Worlds of Tomorrow	Hugo (nom)	Yes			Yes		Yes
"Dog in a Fisherman's Net"	May 1971 in Quark/3, Marilyn Hacker, Samuel R. Delany (ed.)		Yes			Yes		Yes
"Corona"	Oct 1967 in The Magazine of Fantasy and Science Fiction		Yes	Yes		Yes		Yes
"Aye, and Gomorrah..."	Oct 1967 in Dangerous Visions, Harlan Ellison (ed.)	Hugo (nom), Nebula (win)	Yes		Yes	Yes		Yes
"Driftglass"	Jun 1967 in If	Nebula (nom)	Yes			Yes		Yes
"We, in Some Strange Power's Employ, Move on a Rigorous Line"	May 1968 as "Lines of Power", The Magazine of Fantasy and Science Fiction	Hugo (nom), Nebula (nom)	Yes	Yes		Yes		Yes
"Cage of Brass"	Jun 1968 in If		Yes			Yes		Yes
"High Weir"	Oct 1968 in If		Yes			Yes		Yes
"Time Considered as a Helix of Semi-Precious Stones"	Dec 1968 in New Worlds Michael Moorcock and James Sallis (eds.)	Hugo (win), Nebula (win)	Yes	Yes	Yes	Yes		Yes
"Tapestry"	Apr 1970 in New American Review 9 (under the title "The Unicorn Tapestry")							Yes
"Night and the Loves of Joe Dicostanzo"	Nov 1970 in Alchemy and Academe, Anne McCaffrey (ed.)		Yes			Yes		Yes
"Prismatica"	Oct 1977 in The Magazine of Fantasy and Science Fiction	Hugo (nom)		Yes		Yes		Yes
"Empire Star"	1966 as an Ace Double			Yes				
"Omegahelm"	1981 in Distant Stars			Yes		Yes		Yes
"Ruins"	1981 in Distant Stars			Yes		Yes		Yes
"Among the Blobs"	1988 in Mississippi Review 47/48					Yes		Yes
"The Desert of Time"	May 1992 in Omni							
"Citre et Trans"	1993 in Driftglass/Starshards					Yes	Yes	
"Erik, Gwen, and D.H. Lawrence's Esthetic of Unrectified Feeling"	1993 in Driftglass/Starshards					Yes	Yes	
"Atlantis: Model 1924"	1995 in Atlantis: Three Tales						Yes	
"The Spendor and Misery of Bodies, of Cities"	1996 in Review of Contemporary Fiction; repr. 2021 in Out of the Ruins ed. by Preston Grassmann							
"In The Valley of the Nest of Spiders"	2007 in Black Clock							
"The Hermit of Houston"	Sep 2017 in The Magazine of Fantasy and Science Fiction	Locus (win)						
"To the Fordham"	Dec 6, 2019 in Boston Review							
"The Wyrm"	January 10, 2022, in The Baffler; reprinted 2025 in Intergalactic Rejects edited by Storm Humbert							
"First Trip to Brewster"	Nov 2022 in Astra Magazine							

==== Comics/graphic novels ====
- Wonder Woman, 1972
- Empire, art by Howard V. Chaykin, 1978
- "Seven Moons' Light Casts Complex Shadows" in Epic Illustrated No. 2, art by Howard Chaykin, pages 67–74, June 1980
- Bread & Wine: An Erotic Tale of New York, art by Mia Wolff, introduction by Alan Moore, 1999

==== Anthologies ====
- Quark/1 (1970) (edited with Marilyn Hacker)
- Quark/2 (1971) (edited with Marilyn Hacker)
- Quark/3 (1971) (edited with Marilyn Hacker)
- Quark/4 (1971) (edited with Marilyn Hacker)
- Nebula Winners 13 (1980)
- Fifties Fictions (2003), (edited with Josh Lukin), ISBN 9781929512126. Includes 2003 essay "Velocities of Change."

=== Nonfiction ===
==== Critical works ====
- The Jewel-hinged Jaw: Notes on the Language of Science Fiction (Dragon Press, 1977; Wesleyan University Press revised edition 2009, with an introduction by Matthew Cheney)
- The American Shore: Meditations on a Tale of Science Fiction (Dragon Press, 1978; Wesleyan University Press 2014, with an introduction by Matthew Cheney)
- Starboard Wine: More Notes on the Language of Science Fiction (Dragon Press, 1984; Wesleyan University Press, 2012, with an introduction by Matthew Cheney)
- Wagner/Artaud: A Play of 19th and 20th Century Critical Fictions (Ansatz Press, 1988), 0-945195-01-X
- The Straits of Messina (1989), 0-934933-04-9
- Silent Interviews (1995), 0-8195-6280-7
- Longer Views (1996) with an introduction by Kenneth R. James, 0-8195-6293-9
- "Racism and Science Fiction" (1998), New York Review of Science Fiction, Issue 120
- Shorter Views (1999), 0-8195-6369-2
- About Writing (2005), 0-8195-6716-7
- Conversations with Samuel R. Delany (2009), edited by Carl Freedman, University of Mississippi Press
- Occasional Views, Volume 1: "More About Writing" and Other Essays (Wesleyan University Press, 2015); ISBN 9780819579751
- Occasional Views, Volume 2: "The Gamble" and Other Essays (Wesleyan University Press, 2021); ISBN 9780819579782
- DUETS: Frederick Weston & Samuel R. Delany in Conversation (Visual AIDS, 2021) 978-1-7326415-3-2

==== Memoirs and letters ====
- Heavenly Breakfast (1979), a memoir of a New York City commune during the so-called Summer of Love, 0-553-12796-9
- The Motion of Light in Water (1988), a memoir of his experiences as a young gay science fiction writer; winner of the Hugo Award, 0-87795-947-1
- Times Square Red, Times Square Blue (NYU Press, 1999; 2019, 20th anniversary edition with foreword by Robert Reid-Pharr), a discussion of changes in social and sexual interaction in New York's Times Square, 0-8147-1919-8; 978-1-4798-2777-0
- Bread and Wine: An Erotic Tale of New York (1999), an autobiographical comic drawn by Mia Wolff with an introduction by Alan Moore, 1-890451-02-9
- 1984: Selected Letters (2000) with an introduction by Kenneth R. James, 0-9665998-1-0
- In Search of Silence: The Journals of Samuel R. Delany. Volume 1, 1957-1969 (2017), edited and with an introduction by Kenneth R. James, 978-0-8195-7089-5. 2018 Locus Award Finalist (non-fiction)
- Letters from Amherst: Five Narrative Letters (Wesleyan University Press, 2019), with foreword by Nalo Hopkinson; 9780819578204

==== Introductions ====
- The Adventures of Alyx, by Joanna Russ
- We Who Are About To..., by Joanna Russ
- Black Gay Man by Robert Reid-Pharr
- Burning Sky, Selected Stories, by Rachel Pollack
- Conjuring Black Funk: Notes on Culture, Sexuality, and Spirituality, Volume 1 by Herukhuti
- The Cosmic Rape, by Theodore Sturgeon
- Father of Lies, by Brian Evenson (Coffee House Press reprint, 2016) ISBN 9781566894159
- Glory Road, by Robert A. Heinlein
- Green Lantern co-starring Green Arrow #1, by Dennis O'Neil, Neal Adams, Gil Kane (Paperback Library, 1972)
- Microcosmic God, by Theodore Sturgeon
- The Magic: (October 1961-October 1967) Ten Tales by Roger Zelazny, selected and introduced by Samuel R. Delany
- Masters of the Pit, by Michael Moorcock
- Nebula Winners 13, edited by Samuel R. Delany
- A Reader's Guide to Science Fiction, by Baird Searles, Martin Last, Beth Meacham, and Michael Franklin; foreword by Samuel R. Delany
- The Sandman: A Game of You, by Neil Gaiman
- Shade: An Anthology of Fiction by Gay Men of African Descent, edited by Charles Rowell and Bruce Morrow
- Video Spaces: Eight Installations, by Barbara London (Museum of Modern Art, 1995)

== See also ==
- LGBT culture in New York City
- LGBT themes in speculative fiction
- List of LGBT people from New York City
- NYC Pride March
- Stories for Chip: A Tribute to Samuel R. Delany (2015), edited by SF and fantastic fiction writer Nisi Shawl, and published by author and Rosarium Publishing founder, Bill Campbell. With essays and short fiction contributions from writers including Kim Stanley Robinson, Eileen Gunn, Vincent Czyz, and Michael Swanwick.
