= Times Square Red, Times Square Blue =

1999 book by Samuel R. Delany

- Dust jacket from the first edition
- Author: Samuel R. Delany
- Language: English
- Genre: Non-fiction
- Publisher: New York University Press
- Publication date: 1999
- Publication place: United States
- Media type: Print (Hardback)
- Pages: 224 (Paperback ed.)
- ISBN: 0-8147-1919-8
- OCLC: 40838591
- Dewey Decimal: 306.74/09747 21
- LC Class: HQ146.N7 D45 1999

Times Square Red, Times Square Blue is a non-fiction book written by science fiction author Samuel R. Delany and published in 1999 by the New York University Press. The book is a compilation of two separate essays: Times Square Blue and ...Three, Two, One, Contact: Times Square Red. The 20th Anniversary Edition, published in 2019, contains an introduction by Robert Reid-Pharr.

== Contents ==
=== Times Square Blue ===
Times Square Blue is a first-hand narrative of Delany's (often referred to as "Chip," or, occasionally, as "The Professor") sexual exploits in Times Square's pornographic movie theaters with other men (some homosexual, some heterosexual) from 1960 through the mid-1990s. He also describes, in detail, his relationships with these men inside and outside the theatres.

=== ...Three, Two, One, Contact: Times Square Red ===
The second essay in the book discusses the nature of social relations within the realm of urban studies. Delany proposes two kinds of relationships, "contact" and "networking," and analyzes the content and benefits of each. Throughout, Delany draws upon the redevelopment of Times Square to provide examples of these relationships and the ways they are affected by urban infrastructure. He also refers extensively to Jane Jacobs' The Death and Life of Great American Cities.

== Reception ==
The starred 1999 review in Publishers Weekly describes it as being "a provocative and persuasively argued cri de coeur against New York City's gentrification and the redevelopment of Times Square in the name of 'family values and safety,'...(Delany) writes frankly about his gay sexual adventures in the peep shows, porno movie houses and bars of Times Square. This personal history is juxtaposed with a detailed record of how the city's red light zones have changed over the past 40 years." In Salon, the work is described as "remarkable" and "brilliant."

An excerpt from Times Square Red, Times Square Blue is included in Eileen Myles' 2022 collection Pathetic Literature.
