= Dark Reflections =

2007 novel by Samuel R. Delany

- Cover from the first edition
- Author: Samuel R. Delany
- Language: English
- Publisher: Carroll & Graf
- Publication date: 2007
- Publication place: United States
- Media type: Print (Paperback)
- Pages: 295 pp
- ISBN: 0-7867-1947-8
- OCLC: 123444197
- Dewey Decimal: 813/.54 22
- LC Class: PS3554.E437 D37 2007

Dark Reflections is a novel by Samuel R. Delany, published in 2007 by Carroll & Graf, an imprint of Avalon Publishing Group. In 2008 it received a Stonewall Book Award and was nominated for a Lambda Literary Award for Gay Men's Fiction.

== Plot ==
Dark Reflections tells the story of Arnold Hawley, a gay African-American poet who lives most of his life in New York City. The novel is divided into three sections, each illustrating a period in Arnold's life, arranged chronologically backwards, from middle age to youth. In the first part, "The Prize", Hawley is between 52 and 68; a book of his poetry wins a prize and is commercially successful, but neither of his next two books repeat this, and he falls further into poverty. In the second, "Vashti in the Dark" (named after a story by Stephen Crane), Hawley is in his middle 30s; the section tells the story of his brief marriage to a homeless woman. The third, "The Book of Pictures", is set in Hawley's college days, when he is attracted to another gay man, but does not act on his desires.

== Themes ==
Dark Reflections centers on themes of loneliness, sexual repression, fear, and the difficult and often unrewarding life of the artist. As in many other Delany works, a writer is a character in the novel, in this case the protagonist.
