= The Einstein Intersection =

1967 novel by Samuel Delany

- First edition (paperback)
- Author: Samuel R. Delany
- Cover artist: Jack Gaughan
- Language: English
- Genre: Science fiction novel
- Publisher: Ace Books
- Publication date: 1967
- Publication place: United States
- Media type: Print (hardback & paperback)
- Pages: 142 pp

The Einstein Intersection is a 1967 science fiction novel by Samuel R. Delany. The title is a reference to Einstein's Theory of Relativity connecting to Kurt Gödel's constructible universe, which is an analogy to science meeting philosophy. The original publisher, Ace Books, changed Delany's originally intended title from A Fabulous, Formless Darkness for commercial reasons.

The protagonist, Lo Lobey, is loosely based on the character of Orpheus.

== Synopsis ==
In a post-transcendent Earth, intelligent anthropoids deal with genetic mutation from ancient radiation. The beings emulate early human civilization and retell stories from "our ghosts called Man". Lobey, a herder from a small village, sets out on a quest to avenge the death of Friza.

== Reception ==
The Einstein Intersection won the Nebula Award for Best Novel in 1967, and was a finalist for the 1968 Hugo Award for Best Novel.

Algis Budrys, after noting that Delany "has about as little discipline as any writer who has tried his hand" at science fiction and that The Einstein Intersection was a book "whose structure and purpose on its own terms are not realized", declared that the author "simply operates on a plane which Robert Heinlein never dreamed of, nor John W. Campbell, nor – take a deep breath – Ted Sturgeon, Ray Bradbury, nor anyone else we could have put forward as being a poet" before 1960 and "urgently recommended" the novel". In February 1968 he named the book the best novel of 1967.
