= Robert Reid-Pharr =

American literary critic and academic

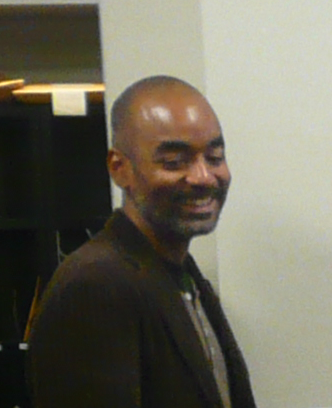
- Reid-Pharr in 2007
- Education: University of North Carolina (BA); Yale University (MA, PhD)
- Occupations: Critic; professor

Robert Reid-Pharr is an American literary and cultural critic and professor.

== Early life and education ==
A native North Carolinian, Reid-Pharr holds a B.A. in political science from the University of North Carolina at Chapel Hill, and both an M.A. in African American studies and a Ph.D. in American studies from Yale University.

== Career ==
Robert Reid-Pharr is professor of Social and Cultural Analysis at New York University. In 2016, he was named a fellow of the John Simon Guggenheim Foundation and visiting professor of gender and sexuality at Harvard University. In 2018, Reid-Pharr became Harvard's first professor of studies of women, gender, and sexuality. His essays have appeared in Callaloo, Social Text, African American Review, American Literary History, AfterImage, Radical America, and American Literature. He has been a fellow of the Alexander von Humboldt Foundation, the Bogliasco Foundation, and the National Endowment for the Humanities. In 2015, he was inducted into the Johns Hopkins Society of Scholars.

Reid-Pharr has taught at the Graduate Center, CUNY, Johns Hopkins University, the University of Chicago, the University of Oregon, the University of Oxford, the American University of Beirut, Swarthmore College, and the College of William and Mary. His collection of essays Black, Gay, Man: Essays won the 2002 Randy Shilts Award for Best Gay Non-fiction given by the Publishing Triangle. His book Once You Go Black: Choice, Desire, and the Black American Intellectual was a finalist for a Lambda Literary Award. He is also the author of Conjugal Union:The Body, the House, and the Black American (Oxford University Press, 1999); and Archives of Flesh: African America, Spain, and Post-Humanist Critique (NYU 2016) for which he received an honorable mention for the 2017 William Sanders Scarborough Prize of the Modern Language Association.

He is considered a "queer public intellectual" who "attempts to write noncompliance with heteronormativity, and affirmation of other ways of being, into existence"

== Selected bibliography ==
- Conjugal Union: The Body, the House, and the Black American (ISBN 978-0195104028)
- Black Gay Man: Essays (with introduction by Samuel R. Delany) (ISBN 978-0814775035)
- Once You Go Black: Choice, Desire, and the Black American Intellectual (ISBN 978-0814775844)
- Archives of Flesh: African America, Spain and Post-Humanist Critique (ISBN 978-1479843626)
