= Hogg (novel) =

Novel by Samuel R. Delany

- First edition
- Author: Samuel R. Delany
- Language: English
- Publisher: Black Ice Books
- Publication date: 1995; 2004
- Publication place: United States
- Media type: Print (Hardcover and paperback)
- Pages: 219 pp
- ISBN: 0-932511-88-0

Hogg is a novel by American author Samuel R. Delany, written in 1969 and published in 1995. The novel deals graphically with themes of murder, child molestation, incest, coprophilia, coprophagia, urolagnia, anal-oral contact, necrophilia and rape. It was conceptualized and written in 1969, with a further draft completed in 1973, and it was finally published with some further, though relatively minor, rewrites in 1995 by Black Ice Books. Two later editions have featured some corrections, the last of which, published by Fiction Collective Two in 2004, carries a note from Delany stating that it is definitive.

== Content ==
=== Preface ===
The preface to the novel is titled "The Scorpion Garden". It is not included in the hardback edition from 1995, although it was written in 1973. It is included in The Straits of Messina (1989).

=== Description ===
The plot features a silent pre-adolescent boy (called only "cocksucker") sold into sexual slavery to a rapist named "Hogg" Hargus, who exposes him to the most extreme acts of deviancy imaginable.

— Leonard Pierce (The A.V. Club), "Inventory: Visionary or Madmen?"

These acts include a substantial amount of "rape, violence, and murder", such as "scenes of Hogg and his gang brutally raping various women" and other "extensive scenes involving consumption of bodily waste." Every chapter in the novel contains graphic sexual or violent acts.

=== Setting ===
The main events of the novel take place on June 26, 27, and 28, 1969, in an unspecified city. The narrator mentions various nearby areas—"Crawhole," "Frontwater," and "Ellenville"—apparently fictional neighborhoods. The nameless city is described as an industrial wasteland. The events take place at docks, garbage barges, truck-stops, bars, as well as within Hogg's truck. Many of the characters are described as workmen or wear work clothes.

In an interview with TK Enright, Delany states "[Hogg's] action takes place in Pornotopia—that is the land where any situation can become rampantly sexual under the least increase in the pressure of attention. Like its sister lands, Comedia and Tragedia, it can only be but so realistic." In the same interview Delany also states, "Hogg is another of my stories that takes place in the city of Enoch." Delany's Neveryóna takes place, in part, in Enoch.

=== Plot summary ===
At the start, the narrator is living with a Hispanic boy named Pedro and performing sex acts with older men in the basement of the dwelling for money, along with Pedro's teenage sister Maria. He engages in sex with Maria, Pedro, a gang of bikers, and a group of Black men. The narrator consistently assumes the bottom role in these sex acts. One out of the group of Black men chooses the narrator specifically, remarking that he appears of possible part-Black ancestry.

The second chapter takes place sometime after the narrator has left Pedro's. It introduces Hogg, first seen raping a woman in an alley. Hogg calls the narrator to him to "finish him up" orally. Hogg takes the narrator to his truck where he explains that while he is a trucker by trade, he prefers getting paid to rape women. Hogg also reveals a bit about himself and his personal history, painting a picture of his overall persona, which is one of extreme sociopathy, violence, and sexual sadism. They drive to meet Mr. Jonas, who despite his apparent wealth answers his own door and later is revealed to drive his own limousine. Mr. Jonas is Hogg's current client. After Mr. Jonas describes Hogg's next assignment Hogg states his intention to bring along several other men, and the narrator as well, to participate. At this point the narrator's place as Hogg's companion is solidly established.

Hogg and the narrator meet the other men—Nigg, Wop, and Denny—at the Piewacket bar. Nigg turns out to be the black man who the narrator first encountered at the beginning of the story. Wop is a violent Italian-American workman. Denny is a rather shy teenage boy, older than the narrator but quite a bit younger than the other men. The quintet of rapists set out to complete their jobs, which grow in succession from a single woman, a woman and her wheelchair-using daughter, and a nuclear family—mother, father and son. Each successive job increases in violence, and the victims' young children (male and female) are also descended on by the pack. During the third rape scene, Denny absconds to the family's kitchen where he decides to pierce his own penis using a nail. Soon Denny's penis begins to bleed, swell and pus, seemingly infected. At this point he begins repeating the phrase "it's all right."

When their last job is completed, the group retires to the Piewacket bar, where they fraternize with members of the Phantoms—the same biker gang encountered in the beginning of the novel. Nigg and one of the bikers, Hawk, hatch a scheme to sell the narrator to a black tugboat captain called Big Sambo. Without consulting Hogg, all three ride away on Hawk's motorcycle to meet Big Sambo at the docks in Crawhole. Big Sambo talks down the price and pays Nigg and Hawk fifteen dollars for the narrator. Big Sambo is a large, physically powerful tugboat operator who keeps his twelve-year-old daughter, Honey-Pie, around as a sex object for his own pleasure.

The narrator goes walking around the docks at night, where he overhears a radio on the deck of a garbage scow. The newscaster on the radio reports on a series of murders that has occurred recently—as it turns out, the suspect is Denny. This is confirmed to the reader when it is noted that the phrase "it's all right" is written in blood at the crime scenes. The Piewacket bar, where the gang had previously hung out, was attacked by Denny with gunfire. Several people including the bartender and some bikers were killed.

On the docks the narrator then meets two garbagemen: Red, a red-headed white man, and Rufus, a black man. While having sex with the narrator outside, they plan to "borrow" the narrator from Big Sambo and keep him at their scow on a collar and leash. They are interrupted by Whitey, a cop who patrols the area, who also has sex with the narrator. Whitey is called down to the waterfront to help investigate the murders of Mona, Harry and their year-old baby. Rufus, Red and the narrator return to the waterfront where a radio crew has recently arrived and reports live from the scene. Big Sambo sees the narrator by the docks and tells him to return to his scow.

Hogg arrives at Big Sambo's scow and assaults Big Sambo. Hogg and the narrator leave the docks in Hogg's truck, in which Denny was hiding from the police. After driving out of the Crawhole area and getting clear of the law, Hogg commands Denny to bathe himself, dress in clean clothes, and hitch a ride to Florida. While driving back from the truck stop Hogg declares his intentions to spend the next few months with the narrator and expresses his happiness that they are reunited. However, the narrator is formulating a plan to leave Hogg at the next opportune moment. Hogg finally asks him "What's the matter?" to which he responds, "Nothin,"—his only line of dialog in the novel.

The off-stage murder spree by Dennis "Denny" Harkner is described by radio reporter Edward Sawyer as "an afternoon and evening long rampage...that threatens to outdo Starkweather, Speck, and Manson together." Later in the novel it is revealed that the spree took place on June 27, 1969, more than a month before the Tate murders were perpetrated by the Manson Family on August 8, 1969.

== Character analysis ==
=== Franklin "Hogg" Hargus ===
Michael Hemmingson wrote in the journal The Review of Contemporary Fiction that Hogg

is a thug, a "rape artist" and terrorizer for hire, with inclinations more homosexual than heterosexual. Hogg may very well be the most vile, disgusting personality to emerge from contemporary American fiction: he never bathes or changes clothes, urinates and defecates in his pants, eats his own various bodily excrete? [sic], drinks a lot of beer and eats plenty of pizza to "maintain" his large gut—he has worms and likes it—and enjoys bringing suffering to others, male or female, mostly for pay but sometimes for his own delectation. Yet he is also fascinating: the embodiment of what our society can turn people into, the decaying condition of the human soul.

== Literary significance and criticism ==
Despite the book's infamous reputation, several respected authors have given it their endorsement. Norman Mailer, for instance, said "There is no question that Hogg by Samuel R. Delany is a serious book with literary merit." J. G. Ballard, prolific speculative fiction author and elder statesman of transgressive literature, also praised Delany's work, citing the medium of pornography as being the "most political form of fiction."

Author Dennis Cooper said in his collection Smothered in Hugs: Essays, Interviews, Feedback, and Obituaries that "Hogg is tiresome and indulgent" and that the "pace is molasses-slow". However, he also goes on to say that "the book is a highly charged object...[and] that's reason enough to recommend it." In the preface to a later edition of Smothered in Hugs, Cooper writes, "I now think Samuel Delany's Hogg is a great novel, and I don't know why I didn't realize that upon first reading."

Jeffrey A. Tucker, associate professor of English at the University of Rochester, comments in his critical study A Sense of Wonder: Samuel R. Delany, Race, Identity and Difference that Hogg "gave expression to the author's hostility toward a heterosexist society, an anger that had no socially constructive outlet prior to the modern Gay Rights movement."
