= The Motion of Light in Water =

1988 autobiography by Samuel R. Delany

- Dust-jacket from the first edition
- Author: Samuel R. Delany
- Language: English
- Genre: Autobiography
- Publisher: Arbor House
- Publication date: 1988
- Publication place: United States
- Media type: Print (Hardcover)(Paperback)
- Pages: 302
- ISBN: 0-87795-947-1
- OCLC: 16833709

The Motion of Light in Water: Sex and Science Fiction Writing in the East Village, is the autobiography of the science fiction author Samuel R. Delany in which he recounts his experiences growing up as a gay African American man, as well as some of his time in an interracial and open marriage with Marilyn Hacker. It describes encounters with Albert Einstein, Bob Dylan, Stokely Carmichael and Stormé DeLarverie, a dinner with W. H. Auden, and a phone call to James Baldwin.

Among many cultural events of the decade that he witnessed, Delany recounts his attendance at the first New York City performance of the artist Allan Kaprow's 18 Happenings in 6 Parts, the 1959 performance piece that, for many, marked the end of modernism and the beginning of postmodernism. In section 17.4 of the University of Minnesota Press edition, he describes the event and its venue, and speculates on its artistic significance. The introduction puts an emphasis on the idea of the unreliable narrator; Delany's accounts often contrast his life as it "felt" to ways in which it actually occurred.

== Awards ==
- 1989 Hugo Award for Best Non-Fiction Book

== Legacy ==
Hazel Carby called it one of two contemporary autobiographies that are "absolutely central to any consideration of black manhood" (the other being that of Miles Davis).

In the chapter, "The Future Is in the Present" of the book Cruising Utopia by José Esteban Munoz, Delany's The Motion of Light in the Water serves to explain how the future, as a form of utopia, can be "glimpsed" in the present through what Delany employed as "the massed bodies" of sexual dissidence.

M. Gessen in O, The Oprah Magazine selected this title as a pick for the "Best LGBTQ Books of All Time", describing it as "a textbook in observing the self, thinking about sex and love, and the best writing manual I know".

== Publication history ==
1988	Arbor House	ISBN 0877959471	302 pages	First edition
1989	Plume	ISBN 0452262321	302 pages	Paperback
1993	Richard Kasak	ISBN 1563331330	520 pages	"The first unexpurgated American edition"
2004	University of Minnesota Press	ISBN 0816645248	584 pages	
2004	InsightOut Books	ISBN 0965903753	572 pages	
2014	Open Road Media			Kindle edition

The first edition is subtitled "1957–1965", the revised 1993 edition is subtitled "1960–1965".
