= Atlantis: Three Tales =

1995 collection of three stories by Samuel R. Delany

- Dust-jacket from the first trade edition
- Author: Samuel R. Delany
- Cover artist: Joseph Stella
- Language: English
- Genre: Short stories
- Publisher: Incunabula / Wesleyan University Press
- Publication date: 1995
- Publication place: United States
- Media type: Print (hardback & paperback)
- Pages: 212
- ISBN: 0-9633637-4-3
- OCLC: 36938595

Atlantis: Three Tales is a 1995 collection of three stories by Samuel R. Delany. The stories are "Atlantis: Model 1924", "Eric, Gwen, and D. H. Lawrence's Esthetic of Unrectified Feeling", and "Citre et Trans". The first edition, published by the Seattle small press Incunabula, also included a "Microflorilegium", a selection of excerpts from the author’s correspondence and a thematic outline of the opening novella. Incunabula also produced the later Wesleyan University Press edition; both editions were edited by Ron Drummond and designed by John D. Berry.

All three stories center around characters named "Sam." The first Sam appears to be based on Delany's father, Samuel R. Delany Sr., while the other two appear to be based on Delany himself. The title story also includes characters based on Delany's aunts, Sadie Delany and Bessie Delany, and incorporates fictionalized Delany family stories about them that are not included in the Delany Sisters' bestselling book Having Our Say.

== Contents ==
- "Atlantis: Model 1924"
- "Erik, Gwen, and D.H. Lawrence’s Esthetic of Unrectified Feeling"
- "Citre et Trans"
- "Microflorilegium" (in the limited edition only)

== Sources ==
- Brown, Charles N.; William G. Contento. "The Locus Index to Science Fiction (1984-1998)". Archived from the original on January 13, 2008.
