= Luke Brown (author) =

British author, editor and critic

- Born: Luke Brown; 8 August 1979 (age 46); Lancaster, Lancashire, England
- Occupations: Author, editor, critic

Luke Brown (born 8 August 1979) is a British author, editor and critic.

He has a PhD in English Literature from the University of Glasgow and has written for the Financial Times, Times Literary Supplement, London Review of Books and New Statesman. His fiction has also appeared in The White Review. In addition, he has worked as an editor of literary fiction.

His debut novel, My Biggest Lie, was published by Canongate Books in 2014. It was described in a review in The Guardian as "witty and tender".

His second novel, Theft, was published by And Other Stories in 2020.

== Novels ==
- My Biggest Lie, Canongate. 2014.
- Theft, And Other Stories. 2020.
