= African American Review =

Academic journal

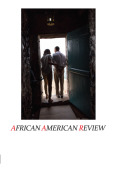
- Discipline: African-American literature; African-American culture
- Language: English
- Edited by: Nathan Grant

Publication details
- Former names: Negro American Literature Forum; Black American Literature Forum
- History: 1967–present
- Publisher: Johns Hopkins University Press for Saint Louis University (United States)
- Frequency: Quarterly

Standard abbreviations
- ISO 4: Afr. Am. Rev.

Indexing
- ISSN: 1062-4783 (print); 1945-6182 (web)
- LCCN: 93643740
- JSTOR: 10624783
- OCLC no.: 40892739

Links
- Journal homepage; Online archive

African American Review is a quarterly scholarly aggregation of essays on African-American literature, theatre, film, the visual arts, and culture; interviews; poetry; fiction; and book reviews. It is the official publication of the Modern Language Association's LLC African American, and is issued by Johns Hopkins University Press. Between 1967 and 1976, the journal appeared under the title Negro American Literature Forum and until 1992 as Black American Literature Forum before obtaining its current title. It is based in St. Louis, Missouri.

The journal has received three American Literary Magazine Awards for Editorial Content, and grants from the National Endowment for the Arts, the Lila Wallace-Reader's Digest Fund, the Kennedy Center for the Performing Arts, and the Council of Literary Magazines and Presses.
