= Time Considered as a Helix of Semi-Precious Stones =

1968 short story by Samuel R. Delany

- Short story by Samuel R. Delany
- Language: English
- Genre: Science fiction

Publication
- Published in: New Worlds
- Publication type: Magazine
- Publisher: Stonehart Publications
- Publication date: December 1968

"Time Considered as a Helix of Semi-Precious Stones" is a science fiction short story by American writer Samuel R. Delany, published in the December 1968 issue of New Worlds. It won the Hugo Award for Best Short Story 1970, and the Nebula Award for Best Novelette in 1969.

== Plot summary ==
A thief and quick-change artist, whose aliases all have the initials "HCE" (a reference to Finnegans Wake by James Joyce), rises up through the ranks to established semi-legit crime boss. His rise inexorably changes his relationships with friends and enemies, associates and acquaintances. The story is told in the first person.

HCE is a professional criminal, looking to improve his life. He is an orphan, saddled with the name Harold Clancy Everet. As a youth he was sent to work on a highly automated dairy farm in the state of Vermont, although the "cows" were basically inert masses of tissue stacked in a barn and hooked up to tubes. He stole the farmer's helicopter, got drunk, and landed on the roof of the old Pan Am building. Sent to jail, he dedicated himself to avoiding such mistakes in future, and never went by the name Harold Clancy Everet again.

He becomes a chameleon, adopting alias after alias. As the story opens, he arrives in New York City on a space flight, carrying a number of small but extremely valuable objects, which he hopes to sell. It is stolen property, although its exact nature is not revealed. Shedding his travel identity, he enters a bar to contact a man who will buy his goods, only to be accosted by a woman who draws his attention to the stone she is wearing in a bracelet. The stone is jasper. Jasper also happens to be the current Word. In the underworld the Word is a kind of password. Used properly, two criminals who may never have met can use it to communicate many shades of meaning, from a greeting to a warning. The Word changes every thirty days, and is always the name of a semi-precious stone. HCE feigns ignorance of the stone's importance.

The woman identifies herself as Special Services Agent Maud Hinkle, from a police bureau which tracks criminals who are changing their status quickly. These are the ones who cause the most problems in society, she claims. She also claims to use "holographic information storage" which can interrelate all the information on a criminal, and which allowed her to predict that HCE would enter that bar so she could intercept him. She then vanishes into the crowd. As HCE pursues her a full-scale brawl breaks out and he barely escapes injury. The man he had hoped to sell the stolen goods to is found dead in the street outside. He is left puzzling over Maud's prediction that there are "helicopters and hawks" in his future. She also mentions that there were "helicopters and cows" in his past, which scares HCE because he did not believe there was any evidence connecting him to the dairy farm, the helicopter having been unregistered.

He hooks up with Hawk, a young poet living in deep poverty. Hawk is also a Singer, a kind of public poet with the ability to improvise a song to celebrate or memorialize a major event. Singers are highly prized in this society. They are much sought after as guests at fashionable parties. Hawk offers to get HCE into one such party after seeing his "property", since potential buyers might be there.

Reaching the lavish party in a penthouse, HCE meets Arty the Hawk, an established crime boss who attracts no interest from Special Services. HCE tells him about meeting Maud, and Arty recognizes her but refuses to help. He tells HCE that she can hurt him, but he can learn to think like her and possibly advance his own career despite her efforts. Just after Arty buys the stolen goods from him, there is a commotion as the police raid the penthouse using helicopters. HCE stages an elaborate diversion involving two of his disguises (Henrietta, Countess of Effingham, and the Honorable Clement Effingham) to cover Arty's escape, and then flees with him and Hawk the Singer in the elevator. They arrive at ground level where the police have the exits sealed. Hawk is persuaded to sing in order to create another diversion. He throws a large oil-burning lamp into a large ornamental pool, setting it ablaze, and then improvises a tale of the night's happenings. This draws a large crowd through which the other two can carefully leave the building.

Using his new money as a stake, HCE builds his career. The Word changes month to month, and occasionally he uses it, as in one case where he arranges the murder of a man. He eventually sets up the first ever ice cream parlor on a moon of Neptune, as an investment and a cover for his activities. He encounters Maud while taking a tourist trip. She is not there to arrest him, she explains, but merely on vacation. Thanks to HCE's upward mobility, both move in social circles that are getting smaller and it is inevitable that they will meet from time to time as she mixes with the criminal fraternity to do her job. Once he stops rising and settles down, she and Special Services will lose professional interest in him.

During their conversation, she tells him how Hawk the Singer had dived back into the blazing pool once his song was over, being near death when he was fished out. Hawk is severely emotionally disturbed, prone to self-injury, and not above asking others to inflict injury on him to satisfy his needs. HCE was one of those people, and he has deeply suppressed guilt about Hawk's situation.

Later, HCE finds Arty the Hawk on his doorstep. Arty explains that he sought him out because their relationship was about to undergo a change. HCE is puzzled, but eventually realizes that Arty and he are about to become rivals. Arty will try to buy him out, then to kill him, because that is the way the world works. If he survives and prospers, he and Arty will eventually become friends because there will be more profit in cooperating than in competing. He tells Arty this, and Arty wholeheartedly agrees. He responds that HCE is starting to think holographically, just like Maud and Special Services. He departs, leaving HCE to contemplate his future.
