= Through the Valley of the Nest of Spiders =

2012 novel by Samuel R. Delany

- First edition
- Author: Samuel R. Delany
- Cover artist: Linda Kosarin
- Language: English
- Publisher: Magnus Books
- Publication date: April 17, 2012
- Publication place: United States
- Pages: 872
- ISBN: 978-1-9368-3314-6

Through the Valley of the Nest of Spiders is a novel by Samuel R. Delany.

== Publishing history ==
An excerpt from a draft of the novel was published as "In the Valley of the Nest of Spiders" in issue 7 of Black Clock magazine. A version of chapter 19 was published as "Puppies" in the anthology I Transgress, edited by Chris Kelso.

First published by Magnus Books as a trade paperback in 2012. A set of typographical corrections for the published novel was released in 2012.

Two corrected editions (a two-volume large print version, and a single volume with cover art by Mia Wolff) were published on Amazon in 2021.

== Plot summary ==
The novel begins in Atlanta, Georgia, on July 6, 2007, where we meet Eric Jeffers some six days before his seventeenth birthday. Eric is living with his adoptive father, Mike. The story follows Eric as he goes to live with his mother, Barbara, in the fictive "Runcible County" on the Georgia coast. There, living in the town of "Diamond Harbor", Eric learns that a black, gay philanthropist has established a utopian community for black gay men in a neighborhood called the Dump. Eric takes a job with the local garbage man, Dynamite Haskell, and his nineteen-year-old son and helper, Morgan Haskell. Eric and Morgan become life partners, and the novel follows them—through job changes (from garbage men, to managing a pornographic theater, to handymen), changes of friends, and changes of address (from a cabin in the Dump, to an apartment over the movie theater, to another cabin out on Gilead, a nearby island)—into the twilight of their years. Though it does move many decades into the future and off-handedly mentions fictional future events and technologies, much of the novel does not feel like far future science fiction. It ends somewhere between 2070 and '80.

== Themes ==
Delany has said, in an interview with Kenneth James, that he was inspired to write the book by a quote from Vladimir Nabokov. In the essay "On A Book Entitled 'Lolita'", Nabokov describes what he learned when he deduced that his novel had been rejected by publishers who, dismayed by its theme of underage sexuality and rape, didn't even read it. He stated:

there are at least three themes which are utterly taboo as far as most American publishers are concerned. The two others are: a Negro-White marriage which is a complete and glorious success resulting in lots of children and grandchildren; and the total atheist who lives a happy and useful life, and dies in his sleep at the age of 106.

== Literary significance and criticism ==
Through the Valley of the Nest of Spiders garnered positive reviews. Roger Bellin of the Los Angeles Review of Books called it "a book worthy of his career full of masterpieces — and a book that no one else could have written." Steven Shaviro stated that "it is the best English-language novel that I know of, of the 21st century so far." Further praise came in reviews from Paul Di Filippo in a review in Locus magazine and a brief review and long discussion led by Jo Walton at Tor.com.

Edward Parker of Lambda Literary stated that "Time is an important theme throughout the book. Delany has constructed the story so that time passes slowly in the beginning—the whole first half of the book covers only five of the novel’s seventy years—and then accelerates as the main characters age, structurally reflecting the human experience of time...but I wondered occasionally, especially in the novel’s first half, whether the story could not have been told in fewer words." Parker criticized what he saw as a lack of editorial oversight, citing as an example a passage describing toastmaking that had little to do with the scene occurring around it but also considering the literary worth of its prose and wondering if it helped the reader relate to "the feeling of the slowness of time."
