= Having Our Say: The Delany Sisters' First 100 Years (film) =

1999 television film directed by Lynne Littman

- Based on: Having Our Say: The Delany Sisters' First 100 Years by Sarah Louise Delany
- Written by: Emily Mann
- Directed by: Lynne Littman
- Starring: Diahann Carroll; Ruby Dee; Amy Madigan; Lisa Arrindell Anderson; Audra McDonald; Mykelti Williamson; Lonette McKee; Richard Roundtree; Della Reese
- Composers: Terence Blanchard; Dennis McCarthy
- Country of origin: United States
- Original language: English

Production
- Executive producers: Camille O. Cosby; Jeffrey S. Grant; Judith James
- Producer: Tony Amatullo
- Cinematography: Frank Byers
- Editor: Brent White
- Running time: 100 minutes
- Production companies: C&J Productions; Columbia TriStar Television; Dreyfuss / James Productions; TeleVest Entertainment

Original release
- Network: CBS
- Release: April 18, 1999

Having Our Say: The Delany Sisters' First 100 Years is a 1999 American made-for-television drama film directed by Lynne Littman. The film is an adaptation of the 1993 biography Having Our Say: The Delany Sisters' First 100 Years written by Sarah Louise Delany (nicknamed "Sadie"), Annie Elizabeth Delany, and journalist Amy Hill Hearth. The telefilm adaptation was written by Emily Mann, who also adapted the book for the Broadway stage (1995). The film first aired on CBS on April 18, 1999, just three months after Sadie died. The film starred Diahann Carroll, Ruby Dee and Amy Madigan.

== Premise ==
The daughters of a former slave who became the first African-American elected bishop in the Episcopal Church in the United States, the sisters were Civil Rights pioneers but were unknown until journalist Amy Hill Hearth interviewed them for a feature story in The New York Times in 1991. The sisters were then 101 and 103 years old.

Sadie, the older of the sisters, was the first African-American permitted to teach Domestic Science at the high school level in the New York City public schools. Bessie was the second African-American woman licensed to practice dentistry in New York State. The biopic deals with the trials and tribulations they faced during a century of life. The sisters share their stories with Ms. Hearth, the journalist (and later, the co-author of their book). Pivotal scenes are re-enacted through flashbacks.

== Cast and characters ==
- Diahann Carroll as Sadie Delany
  - Lisa Arrindell Anderson as Young Sadie
- Ruby Dee as Bessie Delany
  - Audra McDonald as Young Bessie
- Amy Madigan as Amy Hill Hearth
- Mykelti Williamson as Papa Delany
- Lonette McKee as Mama Delany
- Richard Roundtree as Booker T. Washington
- Della Reese as Martha Logan

== Critical reception ==
Ron Wertheimer of The New York Times called the film "clearly a labor of love . . . an engrossing drama built on characters who are at once exceptional and accessible . . . Ms. Carroll and Ms. Dee embody the sisters in middle and old age. Their performances occasionally threaten to glide into caricature but more often capture the women's complementary strengths and frailties and their extraordinary bond."

In his review in Variety, David Kronke said, "Anchored by two excellent performances by Diahann Carroll and Ruby Dee, this is a solidly affecting telepic that rarely preaches or hits a false note . . . By film's end, the viewer feels there truly is a history between these two characters. Supporting performances are strong, with Lonette McKee a standout as the sisters' mother."

== Awards and nominations ==
- Peabody Award for Excellence in Television (winner)
- Writers Guild of America Award (nominee)
- Christopher Award for Outstanding TV and Cable Programming (winner)
- NAACP Image Award for Outstanding Actress in a Television Movie, Mini-Series or Dramatic Special (Ruby Dee and Diahann Carroll, nominees)
- NAACP Image Award for Outstanding Television Movie, Mini-Series or Dramatic Special (nominee)
