= Hubert Thomas Delany =

American politician (1901–1990)

Hon. Hubert Thomas Delany
- Delany in 1938
- Born: May 11, 1901; Raleigh, North Carolina
- Died: December 28, 1990 (aged 89); Manhattan, New York
- Education: City College of New York B.A. NYU School of Law J.D.
- Occupations: Lawyer, Assistant U.S. Attorney, Tax Commissioner, Justice of New York City Domestic Relations Court, Civil Rights Advocate

Signature
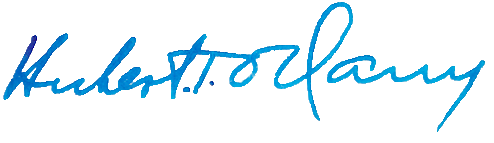

Hubert Thomas Delany (/dəˈleɪni/; May 11, 1901 – December 28, 1990) was an American lawyer and civil rights pioneer, and politician. He served as Assistant U.S. Attorney, the first African American appointed as Tax Commissioner of New York and one of the first African Americans appointed as a judge in New York City. Judge Delany was on the board of Directors for the National Association for the Advancement of Colored People (NAACP), and the Harlem YMCA, and became an active leader in the Harlem Renaissance. He also served as a Vice President of the NAACP Legal Defense and Educational Fund.

Delany graduated from the City College of New York in 1923. He received his Juris Doctor degree from New York University School of Law in 1926 and was a member of Sigma Pi Phi legal fraternity. Delany had a long career serving as both a justice in the New York City Domestic Relations Court as well as an attorney and adviser to civil rights activists Rev. Dr. Martin Luther King Jr., US Congressman Adam Clayton Powell Jr., and poet Langston Hughes. He also advised clients in the entertainment and sports industries, including famed opera singer Marian Anderson, singer and actor Paul Robeson, cartoonist E. Simms Campbell, bandleader Cab Calloway, and Major League Baseball color line breaker Jackie Robinson.

== Early life and education ==
Delany was the eighth of ten children born to the Rev. Henry Beard Delany (1858–1928), the first Black person elected Suffragan Bishop of the Episcopal Church in the United States, and his wife Nannette James (Logan) Delany (1861–1956), an educator. Henry Beard Delany was born into slavery in St. Mary's, Georgia, but later became educated and advanced as a priest and the first African-American bishop in the Episcopal Church. Delany was born and raised on the campus of St. Augustine's School (now University) in Raleigh, North Carolina, where his father was the Vice-Principal and his mother, a teacher and administrator. Delany was a 1919 graduate of the school.

His older sisters Sadie and Bessie Delany were civil rights pioneers in their own right, as a teacher and dentist in New York City, respectively. They co-authored the bestselling oral history, Having Our Say: The Delany Sisters' First 100 Years, along with Amy Hill Hearth, and became famous at the ages of 103 and 101.

Throughout his early years, Delany believed he would follow in his father's footsteps and become a clergyman within the Episcopal Church. Having grown up on the campus of historically black Saint Augustine's College where his parents taught, Delany had been shielded from the rigid system of racial segregation that dominated North Carolina in the early twentieth century.

After finishing high school, Delany soon followed his older siblings to New York City, where he attended the City College of New York. He worked his way through undergraduate college holding a job as a Red Cap railway Pullman porter at New York Penn Station.

During his three years as a law student at NYU Law, Delany was also a teacher in Harlem elementary schools within the New York City Public School system.

== Mid-life and professional career ==
=== Marriage ===
After receiving his law degree from New York University School of Law in 1926, Delany married Clarissa Scott Delany, active in the Harlem Renaissance. Scott, a poet, essayist and educator, was also a social worker with the National Urban League working to gather statistics for a "Study of Delinquent and Neglected Negro Children." Scott died from kidney disease in 1927, after they had been married a year.

=== Second marriage ===
Delany later married again, to Willetta S. Mickey, in a ceremony performed by Mayor Fiorello H. La Guardia. A native of Yonkers, New York, she had attended Howard University. The couple met while she served as Delany's secretary at the Tax Commission. Mrs. Delany was Founder and President of Adopt-A-Child, an interracial interface program of 14 public and private agencies which came together to find homes for Black, Hispanic and minority children needing adoption who, in her words, "were forced to spend their formative years in hospitals, shelters, institutions and boarding homes". She played a vital role in organizing forums and interstate conferences to discuss the inequities and unique issues related to their adoption.

First Lady of the United States Eleanor Roosevelt made a visit to Harlem in 1954 to support the efforts of the growing Spence-Chapin Adoption Service. Judge Delany and his wife Willetta became the first African American family to host an incumbent First Lady, giving a reception from Mrs. Roosevelt at their home on 145th street and Riverside Drive.

Mrs. Willetta Delany was one of the earliest African-American women on the Board of Spence-Chapin Adoption Service, along with Mrs. Rachel Robinson, Mrs. Ralph Bunche, and Marian Anderson. In support of the agency's outreach efforts, Eleanor Roosevelt was the featured speaker for a Spence-Chapin conference. Mrs. Roosevelt was quoted in The New York Times as saying, "No matter what the color of their skin, all our children must be looked at as the future rich heritage of the country."

=== Legal and political career ===
After graduation and passing the bar, from 1927 until 1933, Delany served as Assistant U.S. Attorney for the Southern District of New York, appointed by Charles H. Tuttle, the United States Attorney for the Southern District of New York. By 1934, he was the highest paid African-American federal appointee in the nation, and had won 493 of the 500 cases he had argued in U.S. District Court.

In 1929, Delany ran for Congress, representing New York's "old" twenty-first district (today's (2015) New York's 13th congressional district, incorporating neighborhoods of Harlem, Inwood, Marble Hill, Spanish Harlem, Washington Heights, and Morningside Heights) in the House of Representatives. He won the Republican primary but lost the general election to Democrat Joseph A. Gavagan. Nonetheless, Delany gained the respect and friendship of Mayor Fiorello H. La Guardia. Delany won 26,666 (37.9%) of the 70,000 votes cast.

Mayor LaGuardia appointed Delany in 1934 as city tax commissioner. In 1942 he appointed Delany as a judge on the Court of Domestic Relations.

During the Harlem riot of 1935, Delany and Mayor LaGuardia walked through the streets together to try to quiet things down. After the riot, Mayor LaGuardia appointed Delany and others, including historian E. Franklin Frazier, poet Countee Cullen, and labor leader A. Philip Randolph, to the Mayor's Commission on Conditions in Harlem. Their investigatory commission found that the riot was caused not by communist agitators, as some had speculated, but by frustration due to conditions of economic deprivation, racial discrimination, and an unresponsive city government.

In 1933, Delany joined the law firm Mintzer, Todarelli and Kleid. He left in 1937 to establish his own law practice. Among his many clients was the classical contralto Marian Anderson. In 1939, after the Daughters of the American Revolution (DAR) refused to allow Anderson to perform in Constitution Hall in Washington D.C., Delany introduced the resolution to the executive board of the NAACP that led to her performing instead on the steps of the Lincoln Memorial. As a result of the ensuing furor around the DAR denying Anderson performance space, thousands of DAR members, including First Lady Eleanor Roosevelt, resigned from the organization.

On January 1, 1942, Delany was appointed as Justice of the Family Court by Mayor Fiorello H. La Guardia and served until 1955. During his tenure, Judge Delany established himself as a compassionate and humane Justice as well as a strong and passionate advocate for civil rights. In 1943, he hosted the formal opening of a Harlem campaign for a Colored Orphan Asylum in response to inadequate services supplied to black children by various religious organizations. Delany condemned religious groups, the United States military, and employers for their treatment of blacks, Jews, and Catholics. Delany also served on the National Advisory Board of the Commission on Law and Social Action (CLSA), the legal arm of the American Jewish Congress (AJC).

Delany's advice on juvenile issues was "eagerly sought by many individuals and organizations." His many admirers and colleagues cited the understanding, fairness and delicacy with which he approached his cases. In 1946, alongside Justice Jane Bolin, Delany criticized the practice of racial matching of probation officers with juvenile probationers. He was also an active member of the Citizens’ Committee for Children of New York City. Delaney's critics, however, labeled him too "liberal." His briefs were often interpreted by his critics as "left-wing views". Some believed this was the "rationale" for Mayor Wagner's not reappointing Delany in 1955, although he was backed by several bar associations. The New York Times claimed that Mayor Robert F. Wagner declined to reappoint Delany because he held communist views; Delany believed the reason was his vocal and public stand on civil rights and against second-class citizenship for Black Americans. The NAACP and the National Urban League supported Judge Delany and protested the Mayor's decision.

In 1956, after retiring from the Domestic Relations Court, Delany continued to practice along with attorneys Emile Zola Berman Esq, A. Harold Frost Esq. and George J. Mintzer Esq. The firm litigated within all of the courts of the State of New York, Federal District and Circuit Courts, and the Supreme Court of the United States.

=== Second class treatment ===
In 1955, during a stay in Hartford, Connecticut, to speak on juvenile delinquency, Judge Delany filed a complaint of second-class treatment with Hartford's Commission on Civil Rights. The Statler Hotel had denied him a room although he had a reservation, because he was Black. The hotel staff offered him instead the use of a cot in a meeting room.

=== Consultant to State of Israel ===
In the Spring of 1956, the Government of Israel invited Delany to Tel Aviv as consultant to the Minister of Justice to study juvenile delinquency and assist in the reorganization of the Domestic Relations Courts of the State of Israel. In late 1956, he published an article discussing his consultancy and findings, entitled "Hubert Delany Reports on Israel", in The Crisis, the official NAACP publication.

=== Martin Luther King trial of 1960 ===
In late 1959, Martin Luther King Jr. was leaving Montgomery, Alabama, to return to his father's church, Ebenezer Baptist in Atlanta, Georgia. Just prior to his departure, Alabama authorities charged King with failure to pay income tax. Leading King's legal team, Delany won a historic "not guilty" verdict from an all-white jury in segregated Alabama.

After the trial, King wrote that the verdict was a "turning point" in his life and praised Delany and his other principal lawyer, William Robert Ming:

"They brought to the courtroom wisdom, courage, and a highly developed art of advocacy; but most important, they brought the lawyers' indomitable determination to win. After a trial of three days, by the sheer strength of their legal arsenal, they overcame the most vicious Southern taboos festering in a virulent and inflamed atmosphere and they persuaded an all-white jury to accept the word of a Negro over that of white men."

In his autobiography, Dr. King described the trial this way:

"This case was tried before an all-white Southern jury. All of the State's witnesses were white. The judge and the prosecutor were white. The courtroom was segregated. Passions were inflamed. Feelings ran high. The press and other communications media were hostile. Defeat seemed certain, and we in the freedom struggle braced ourselves for the inevitable. There were two men among us who persevered with the conviction that it was possible, in this context, to marshal facts and law and thus win vindication. These men were our lawyers-Negro lawyers from the North: William Ming of Chicago and Hubert Delany from New York."

Dr. King also noted:

"I am frank to confess that on this occasion I learned that truth and conviction in the hands of a skillful advocate could make what started out as a bigoted, prejudiced jury, choose the path of justice. I cannot help but wish in my heart that the same kind of skill and devotion which Bill Ming and Hubert Delany accorded to me could be available to thousands of civil rights workers, to thousands of ordinary Negroes, who are every day facing prejudiced courtrooms."

King's wife, Coretta Scott King, discussed the trial in her autobiography: "A southern jury of twelve white men had acquitted Martin. It was a triumph of justice, a miracle that restored your faith in human good."

=== Low-income housing ===
In May 1963, Governor of New York Nelson Rockefeller appointed Delany as chairman of a powerful Temporary State Commission on Low-income Housing. The commission held all the authority of a full legislative public inquiry with the ability to call witnesses and subpoena records. The commission proposed using state funds to help low-income families live in middle-income housing projects and privately owned apartments as a means of promoting integration. By proposing to subsidize low-income families, placing them in middle-income units built with state assistance, the Delany commission ultimately went far beyond the original Rockefeller plan. This early commission became the forerunner to creation of the New York State Urban Development Corporation (UDC) in 1968. The UDC was designed and given broad powers and resources to "improve the physical environment for low-and moderate-income families." Under Governor Rockefeller, and by 1973, the UDC (known today as the Empire State Development Corporation) had successfully created over 88,000 units of housing for limited income families and the aging.

=== Powell v. McCormack, 395 U.S. 486 (1969) ===
Delany was on the brief for the United States Supreme Court decision determining Congressman Adam Clayton Powell's seating in the 90th Congress. Arthur Kinoy and Herbert O. Reid argued the cause for petitioners and with them on the brief were Robert L. Carter, Hubert T. Delany, William Kunstler, Frank D. Reeves, and Henry R. Williams.

POWELL ET AL. v. McCORMACK, SPEAKER OF THE HOUSE OF REPRESENTATIVES, ET AL Powell v. McCormack, 395 U.S. 486, 89 S. Ct. 1944 (1969) No. 138

Argued: April 21, 1969, Decided: June 16, 1969

In November 1966, petitioner Adam Clayton Powell, an African American congressman from New York, had been duly elected to serve in the House of Representatives for the 90th Congress. However, he was denied his seat when a majority of the House voted to exclude him with the adoption of House Resolution No 278. The House's action followed charges that Powell had misappropriated public funds and abused the process of the New York courts. Powell and a group of his constituents filed suit in the district court against Speaker of the House John McCormack and other House officials, alleging that the resolution to exclude him violated his constitutional right to serve so long as he met the specified age, citizenship, and residence requirements. The suit claimed that the House could exclude him only if it found he failed to meet the standing requirements of age, citizenship, and residence contained in Art. I, 2, of the Constitution - requirements the House specifically found Powell met - and thus had excluded him unconstitutionally. The District Court dismissed petitioner's complaint "for want of jurisdiction of the subject matter." A panel of the Court of Appeals affirmed the dismissal, although on somewhat differ 29 U.S. App. D.C. 354, 395 F.2d 577, affirmed in part, reversed in part, and remanded to the District Court for entry of a declaratory judgment and for further proceedings.

Powell, who was subsequently re-elected to his seat in a special election, sought back pay along with recompense for other damages.

== Death ==
On December 28, 1990, Delany died at the age of 89 in Manhattan where he lived the majority of his life. He was survived by a wife, Willetta Delany, a daughter, Dr. Madelon Delany Stent; professor of education at City College of New York and a son, Dr. Harry Mickey Delany; Chairman of the Department of Surgery Jacobi Medical Center and North Central Bronx Hospital, as well as six grandchildren and two great-grandchildren.

== Honors and legacy ==
- 1945: Lincoln University (Pennsylvania) awarded Delany an Honorary Legum Doctor (LL.D.)
- 1956: Tel Aviv University (Hebrew: אוּנִיבֶרְסִיטַת תֵּל-אָבִיב Universitat Tel Aviv) in Israel awarded Delany an Honorary Fellowship. He was one of only two Americans to receive the honor, the other being Episcopal Bishop James Albert Pike.

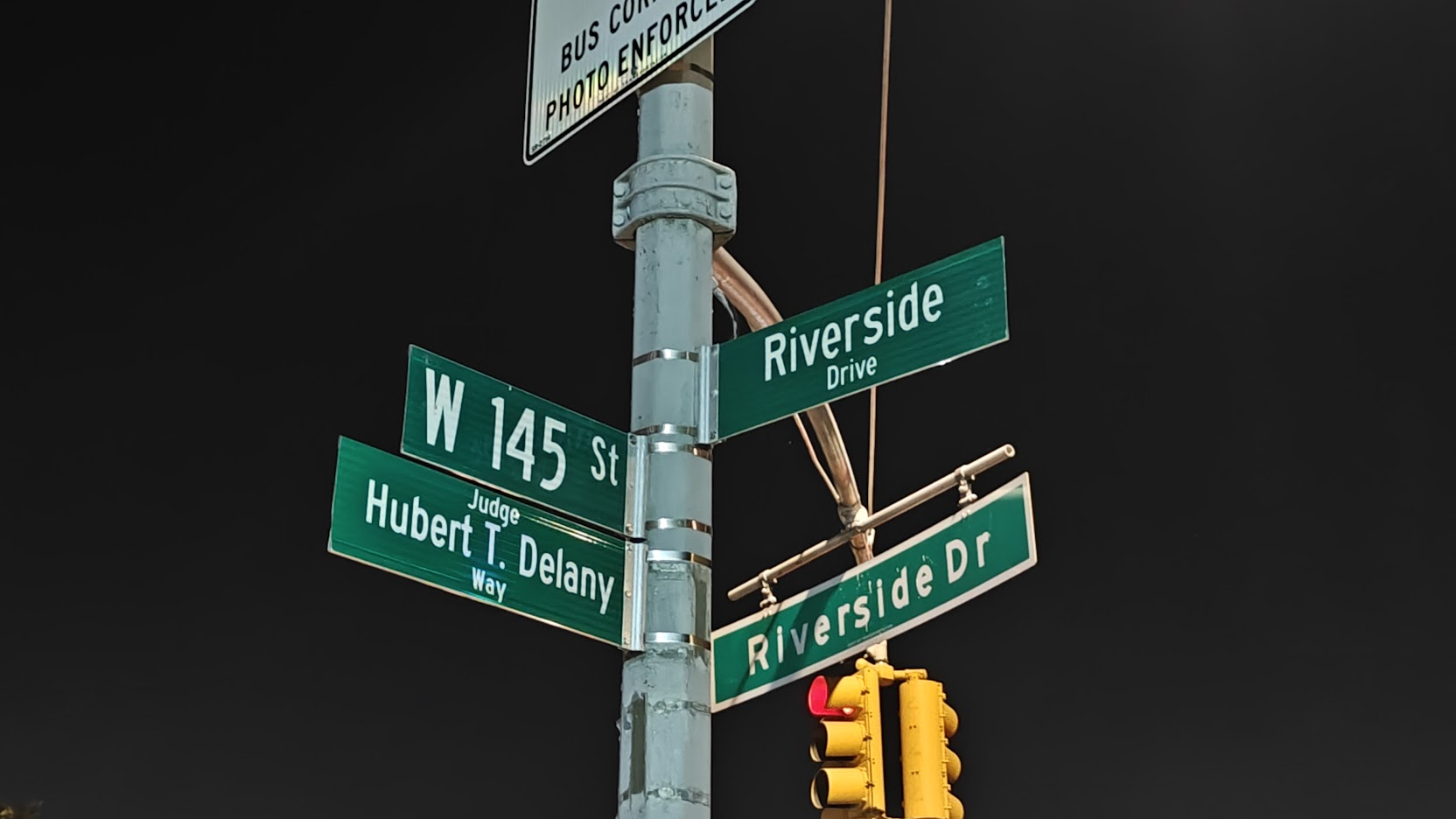
Hubert Thomas Delany Way Street Co-Naming in Harlem NYC

- 2024: In New York City, on May 11, 2024 - what would be Delanys 123rd birthday - a street was co-named "Judge Hubert T. Delany Way" in honor of Delanys life and contributions to the Harlem community. The location, the corner at West 145th Street and Riverside Drive, was where Judge Delany lived."

Many of Delany's papers, photographs and other materials can be found at the New York Public Library's Schomburg Center for Research in Black Culture in Harlem, New York.

== Family origins ==
More often than not, descendants of enslaved Africans are faced with many challenges when attempting to find ancestry prior to the American Civil War. The ancestry of Judge Delany's African American family has been accurately traced back to the mid 18th century with ties to St. Marys, Georgia, Fernandina Beach, Florida, and the Danville, Virginia, area. This historic account of an African American family is documented by Delany's two older sisters Sadie and Bessie Delany, in the autobiographical bestseller Having Our Say: The Delany Sisters' First 100 Years

=== Children of Bishop Henry Beard Delany ===
Hubert T. Delany was the eighth of ten children born to the Rev. Henry Beard Delany (1858–1928), the first Black person elected Bishop Suffragan of the Episcopal Church in the United States. His siblings were:

- Sadie (1889–1999) and Bessie (1891–1995) Delany, both lived to become centenarian authors of the autobiographical bestseller Having Our Say: The Delany Sisters' First 100 Years which documents an historically accurate, nonfiction account of the trials and tribulations the Delany sisters and their family faced during their century of life. The book offers positive images and details of African-American life in the 1890s. Having Our Say illustrates why the Jim Crow laws of racial segregation prompted the Delany sisters and their siblings to make the move from the segregated south to Harlem NYC where many in the family were active in the burgeoning Harlem Renaissance and Civil Rights Movement.
- Lemuel Thackara Delany (1887–1956) was a graduate of St. Augustine's College in 1907. He practiced as a physician at St. Agnes Hospital and established a medical practice in Raleigh, North Carolina
- Julia Emery Delany (1893–1974) A gifted musician. Attended Juilliard School of Music in New York City and became an accomplished singer and music teacher.
- Henry Beard Delany Jr. (1895–1991) The first Delany to move to New York City. A graduate of New York University and became a well known dentist. Had a private practice in Harlem with his sister Bessie.
- Lucius Logan Delany Sr. (1897–1969) A graduate of City College of New York and New York University. He became a practicing attorney.
- William Manross Delany (1899–1955) Graduate of Saint Augustine's College and Shaw University. He served in World War I & World War II but faced discrimination in the armed forces.
- Laura Edith Delany (1903–1993) A graduate from Hunter College in NYC and became a school teacher.
- Samuel Ray Delany (1906–1960) A graduate of St. Augustine's College. He became a mortician and established Levy & Delany Funeral Home in Harlem, New York City.

American author, professor and literary critic Samuel R. Delany is the nephew of Hubert T. Delany. He is the author of numerous science fiction books including Dhalgren, Babel-17, and Return to Nevèrÿon, as well as the best-selling nonfiction study Times Square Red, Times Square Blue. His science fiction novels Babel-17 and The Einstein Intersection were winners of the Nebula Award for 1966 and 1967, respectively.

=== Connection to St. Augustine's University ===
Founded in 1867 as Saint Augustine's Normal School, the institution first changed its name to Saint Augustine's School in 1893 and then to Saint Augustine's Junior College in 1919 when it began offering college-level coursework. Beginning in the mid-1880s, the children of the Rev. and Mrs. Henry Beard Delany were all born, raised and educated on this campus. The Delanys witnessed a growing St. Augustine's become the first school of nursing in the state of North Carolina for African-Americans. Even today, the Delany family is described as "The First Family of St. Augustine's".

The Delany family began its lengthy relationship with the now historically black college in 1881 when Henry Beard Delany, a former slave from Florida, arrived to study theology. The university further describes the family: "As the children of educators, the younger family members understood the importance of education to the future. Many became teachers committed to working with black students while others received advanced degrees after leaving St. Augustine's. Lemuel Delany, like his parents, remained at the school and served the black community as a surgeon at St. Agnes Hospital. Bessie Delany became a dentist and one of only two black women practicing in New York at the time. Three of the siblings, including Sarah Delany, the first black person in New York to teach high school domestic science, were lifelong educators. The careers of the other Delany children included a judge, an attorney, and two undertakers."
