= Sadie and Bessie Delany =

Sadie and Bessie Delany were two American sisters and human rights pioneers who wrote a successful book of memoirs.

For more information, see:

- Sarah Louise Delany
- Annie Elizabeth Delany
- Having Our Say: The Delany Sisters' First 100 Years (the book)
