= Emily Mann (director) =

American stage director and dramatist

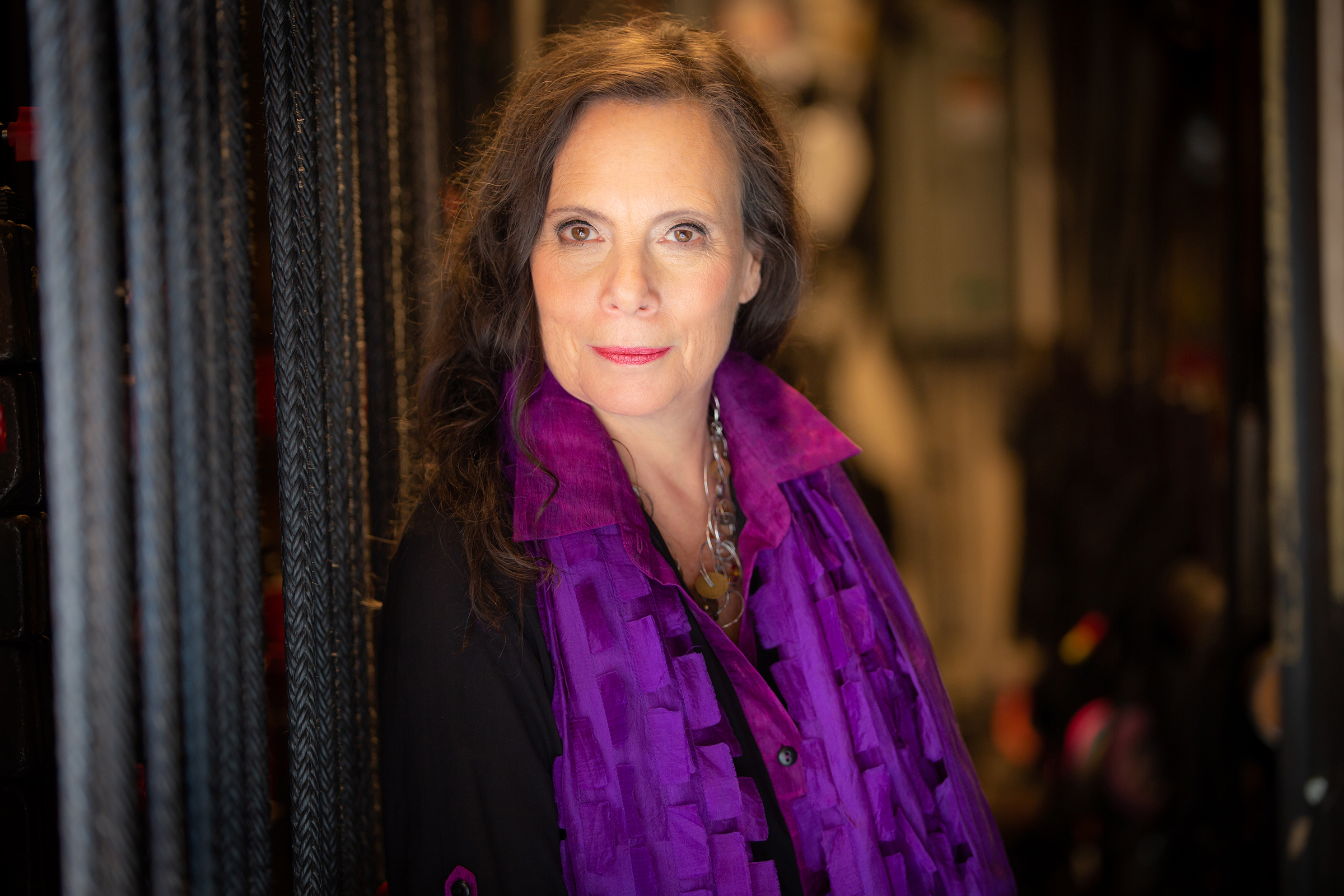
- Born: Emily Betsy Mann; April 12, 1952 (age 74); Boston, Massachusetts, U.S.
- Education: Harvard University (BA); University of Minnesota (MFA)
- Occupations: Theatre director Playwright; Screenwriter
- Years active: 1976–present
- Spouse(s): Gerry Bamman (m. 1981, divorced) Gary Mailman (m. 2000)
- Children: 1

Emily Betsy Mann (born April 12, 1952) is an American director, playwright and screenwriter. She served as the artistic director and resident playwright of the McCarter Theatre from 1990 to 2020.

== Career ==
As the McCarter Theatre Center's Artistic Director and Resident Playwright from 1990 to 2020, Mann oversaw more than 160 productions, including more than 40 world premieres. During her tenure, the theater won the Tony Award for Outstanding Regional Theatre, and Mann herself was twice nominated for Tony Awards as a playwright and director. She was inducted into the American Theater Hall of Fame in 2019.

Her other personal awards include the Peabody Award, the Hull-Warriner Award from the Dramatists Guild, awards from the NAACP, eight Obie awards, a Guggenheim Fellowship, the 2011 Person of the Year Award from the National Theater Conference, as well as the Margo Jones Award, given to a "citizen-of-the-theatre who has demonstrated a lifetime commitment to the encouragement of the living theatre everywhere" and the 2021 Gordon Davidson Award from the foundation of the Stage Directors and Choreographers Society. Mann also received an honorary Doctorate of Arts from Princeton University.

In January 2019, McCarter Theatre announced that Mann would retire from the position following the 2019–2020 season. The McCarter Theatre will honor Mann with the Inaugural Roger S. Berlind Award in June 2026.

Mann's nearly 50 McCarter directing credits include productions by William Shakespeare, Anton Chekhov, Henrik Ibsen, and Tennessee Williams and the world premieres of Christopher Durang's Turning Off the Morning News; Ken Ludwig's adaptation of Agatha Christie's Murder on the Orient Express; Danai Gurira's The Convert; Rachel Bonds' Five Mile Lake; Sarah Treem's The How and the Why; Christopher Durang's Miss Witherspoon; and Edward Albee's Me, Myself and I. She has also directed Broadway shows A Streetcar Named Desire, Anna in the Tropics, Execution of Justice, and Having Our Say.

Her plays include: Having Our Say, adapted from the book by Sarah Louise Delany and Annie Elizabeth Delany with Amy Hill Hearth; Execution of Justice; Still Life; Annulla, An Autobiography; Greensboro (A Requiem); Meshugah; Mrs. Packard and Hoodwinked (a Primer on Radical Islamism).

Her play, Gloria: A Life, about the legacy of Gloria Steinem played off-Broadway at the Daryl Roth Theatre from October 2018 through March 2019.. The play aired on PBS Great Performances in June 2020.

She directed adaptations of Baby Doll, Scenes from a Marriage, Uncle Vanya, The Cherry Orchard, A Seagull in the Hamptons, The House of Bernarda Alba, Antigone. In 2023 she developed a new adaptation of The Pianist which ran regionally at the George Street Playhouse.

Mann grew up in Chicago, where her father taught history. She graduated from the University of Chicago Laboratory Schools high school in 1970. She completed her BA in English literature at Harvard University (Radcliffe College) in 1974 and her MFA in Directing from the University of Minnesota in 1976.

Mann was married to the actor Gerry Bamman, with whom she shares a son, Nicholas. She is now married to Gary Mailman, an attorney. Mann and Mailman live in Princeton, New Jersey. She was diagnosed with multiple sclerosis in 1994.

A biography of Mann, "Emily Mann: Rebel Artist of the American Theater," by Alexis Greene was published in November 2021 by Applause Theatre & Cinema Books.

== Works ==
=== Directing ===
Some of her McCarter directing credits include:

- The world premiere of Miss Witherspoon by Christopher Durang (also Off-Broadway at Playwrights Horizons)
- The world premiere of The Bells by Theresa Rebeck
- The world premiere of Last of the Boys by Steven Dietz
- Nilo Cruz's Anna in the Tropics at McCarter and on Broadway with Jimmy Smits (2003 Pulitzer Prize, two Tony nominations)
- Anton Chekhov's Uncle Vanya (also adapted) with Amanda Plummer
- Edward Albee's All Over with Rosemary Harris and Michael Learned and at Roundabout Theater Company (Obie Awards for her direction and for Rosemary Harris's performance)
- The Tempest with Blair Brown, Romeo and Juliet with Sarah Drew and Jeffrey Carlson
- The Cherry Orchard (also adapted) with Jane Alexander and Avery Brooks
- I.B. Singer's Meshugah (adaptor and director) with Elizabeth Marvel
- The American premiere of The Mai by Marina Carr
- The world premiere of Anna Deavere Smith's Twilight: Los Angeles, 1992 (also at the Mark Taper Forum)
- Federico García Lorca's The House of Bernarda Alba (also adapted) with Helen Carey
- The world premiere of Joyce Carol Oates' The Perfectionist
- August Strindberg's Miss Julie (also adapted) with Kim Cattrall, Donna Murphy and Peter Francis James
- Cat on a Hot Tin Roof with Pat Hingle and JoBeth Williams
- Chekhov's Three Sisters with Frances McDormand, Linda Hunt, and Mary Stuart Masterson
- Betsey Brown (co-author with Baikida Carroll and Ntozake Shange)
- The Glass Menagerie with Shirley Knight, Dylan McDermott and Judy Kuhn
- The world premiere of Edward Albee's Me, Myself, and I (also at Playwrights Horizons) with Tyne Daly and Brian Murray
- The world premiere of Sarah Treem's The How and the Why with Mercedes Ruehl
- The world premiere of Phaedra Backwards by Marina Carr
- The world premiere of The Convert by Danai Gurira (also at the Goodman Theatre in Chicago and Center Theatre Group in Los Angeles; six Ovation Awards, including Best Director of a Play and nominated for thirteen; also nominated for three Joseph Jefferson Awards including Best Production.)
- Edward Albee’s A Delicate Balance (play) featuring John Glover (actor), Kathleen Chalfant, and Mary Beth Hurt
- David Auburn’s Proof
- Antony and Cleopatra featuring Nicole Ari Parker and Esau Pritchett
- Rachel Bond's Five Mile Lake
- The Broadway revival of Tennessee Williams' A Streetcar Named Desire with Blair Underwood, Wood Harris, Nicole Ari Parker, and Daphne Rubin-Vega
- Tennessee Williams' Baby Doll Mann co-adapted for the stage with Pierre Laville
- Bathing in Moonlight by Nilo Cruz
- The world premiere of Turning Off the Morning News by Christopher Durang
- Upcoming - David Hare (playwright)'s "Skylight (play)"

=== Writing ===
- Author of Greensboro (A Requiem)
- Author and director of Execution of Justice at the Guthrie Theater, Arena Stage, and on Broadway (winner of the HBO New Plays USA award, the Helen Hayes Award, the Joseph Jefferson Award, the Bay Area Critics Circle Award, and nominated for a Drama Desk and Outer Critics Circle Award)
- Still Life (6 Obie Awards including playwriting, direction and production of the season) most recently produced by Retro Productions in New York City at the 78th Street Lab, directed by Ric Sechrest during February 2007, for which star Heather E. Cunningham, as Cheryl, was chosen as Marc Miller's "Performance to Remember, 2007" for Backstage East
- Annulla, An Autobiography
- Wrote and directed Having Our Say, adapted from the book by Sarah Louise Delany and A. Elizabeth Delany with Amy Hill Hearth at McCarter and on Broadway (3 Tony Award nominations including Best Play and Best Direction, and a Drama Desk nomination; a Joseph Jefferson Award and for the screenplay Peabody, a Christopher Award and an NAACP award nomination).
- Mrs. Packard had its world premiere at McCarter Theatre in May 2007 before transferring to The Kennedy Center in June. Acting edition published by Broadway Play Publishing Inc.
- Wrote and directed A Seagull in the Hamptons, adapted and modernized from Anton Chekhov's The Seagull. The play premiered at the McCarter Theatre May 2008. Published by Broadway Play Publishing Inc.
- Author of "Gloria: A Life" about the legacy of Gloria Steinem
- Wrote a stage adaptation of "The Pianist" based on the memoir of composer Władysław Szpilman
- Mann has also adapted versions of Uncle Vanya, The Cherry Orchard, and House of Bernarda Alba (recently staged in London)
- A collection of her plays, Testimonies: Four Plays, has been published by Theatre Communications Group
