= Miss Witherspoon =

2005 play by Christopher Durang

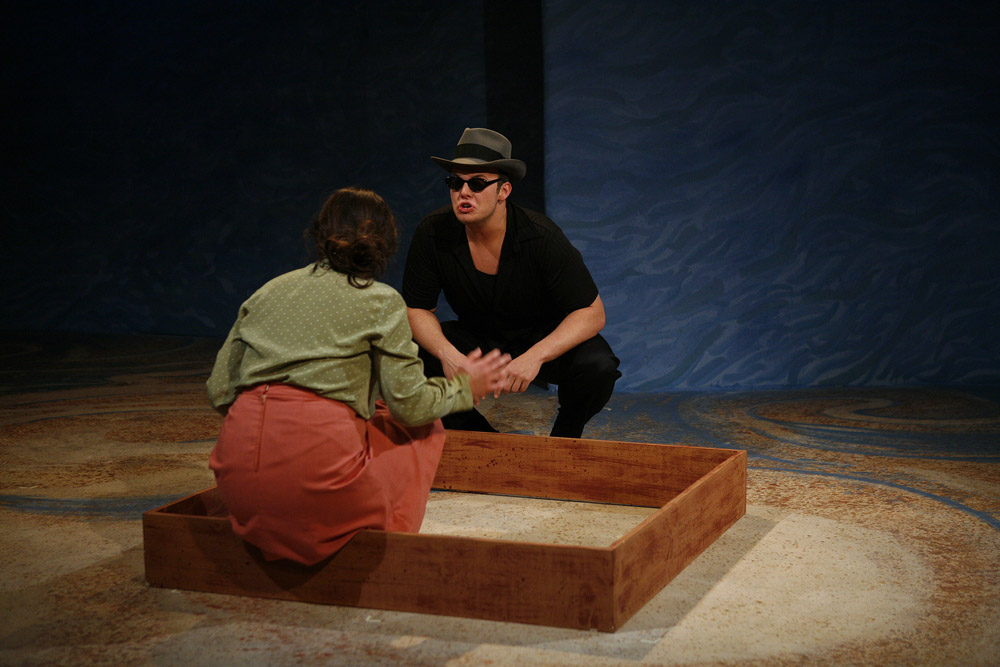
Scene from a performance of Miss Witherspoon

Miss Witherspoon is a play written by Christopher Durang. It was one of three finalists for the 2006 Pulitzer Prize for Drama. The play, a black comedy, was named one of the Ten Best Plays of 2005 by Time Magazine and Newsday.

== Plot summary ==
The play takes place in the recent past (1998) and the foreseeable future (2005 and beyond), on Earth, and "not earth."

A woman named Veronica, who recently committed suicide, has to go back to the world of the living to cleanse her “brown tweedy aura” and learn the values of life. She finds herself in Bardo, a Tibetan Buddhist netherworld and the place where one waits to be reincarnated. She is not enthusiastic, she wants to die again as soon as possible.

But her perky Indian spirit guide Maryamma insists that she go back to earth, again and again, and it is all for her own good. She is persistently pessimistic and cranky and the other spirits dub her "Miss Witherspoon"

== Production history ==
The play was commissioned by the McCarter Theatre, Princeton, New Jersey, and premiered there on September 9, 2005, running to October 16, 2005.

Miss Witherspoon premiered Off-Broadway at Playwrights Horizons in association with McCarter Theatre on November 29, 2005, and closed on January 1, 2006. Directed by Emily Mann, the cast included Kristine Nielsen and Jeremy Shamos.

The play was a finalist for the Pulitzer Prize for Drama for 2006; there was no award given that year.

Subsequent productions include:

- ACT Theatre in Seattle on April 28, 2006, starring Anne Allgood and Terry Edward Moore.
- Integrity Productions in Portland on October 5, 2006, with Kim Bogus as Miss Witherspoon and Adrienne Vogel as Maryamma.
- Unicorn Theatre in Kansas City, Missouri on December 4, 2009, with Jan Rogge as Miss Witherspoon and Amy Urbina as Maryamma.
- New City Stage in Philadelphia on December 10, 2010, with Julie Czarnecki as Miss Witherspoon and Indika Senanayake as Maryamma.
- Heller Theatre in Tulsa, Oklahoma on September 10, 2011, in a production starring Kathryn Hartney and Angela Adams.
- Burgdorff Center for the Performing Arts in Maplewood, New Jersey on April 12, 2012.
- Carolina Actors Studio Theatre in Charlotte, North Carolina on March 28, 2013, starring Shawnna Pledger and Ana Rodriguez.

== Critical reception ==
Ben Brantley, in his review of the 2005 production for the New York Times, wrote: "As it pursues the afterlife and later lives of its title character, "Miss Witherspoon" retreads territory that Mr. Durang has charted more sharply before, from family pathology (The Marriage of Bette and Boo) to theological perversity (Sister Mary Ignatius Explains It All for You). This meandering sweep dilutes impact ....aside from a gorgeously realized opening scene that establishes its heroine's particularly obdurate form of depression....the play feels, well, earthbound in its familiar sendups of the nastiness of earthly life.... Ms. Nielsen's eyes go wide at such moments and her voice becomes a wounded bleat. That the same genuine pain underlines Mr. Durang's habitual archness is what makes him, even when he's not in top form, such an essential and affecting presence in the American theater."

The CurtainUp reviewer of the 2005 production wrote: "Miss Witherspoon is part fable, part stand-up comedy, part farce. It's a fable that puts a hopeful spin on the modern world's man-made and natural horrors, stand-up comedy that's roll-over with laughter funny—and even at its most whacky and farcical, it's never witless. Despite some lapses into somewhat preachy and facile interchanges, it all adds up to a timely, stimulating, colorfully staged—and, yes, hopeful—ninety minutes. If you'll forgive the indulgence in word play, it's a tour-de-farce elevated to heavenly heights by tour-de-farceur Kristine Nielsen."
