= Henry Beard Delany =

American clergyman

The Right Reverend Henry Beard Delany D.D.
- Suffragan Bishop of North Carolina
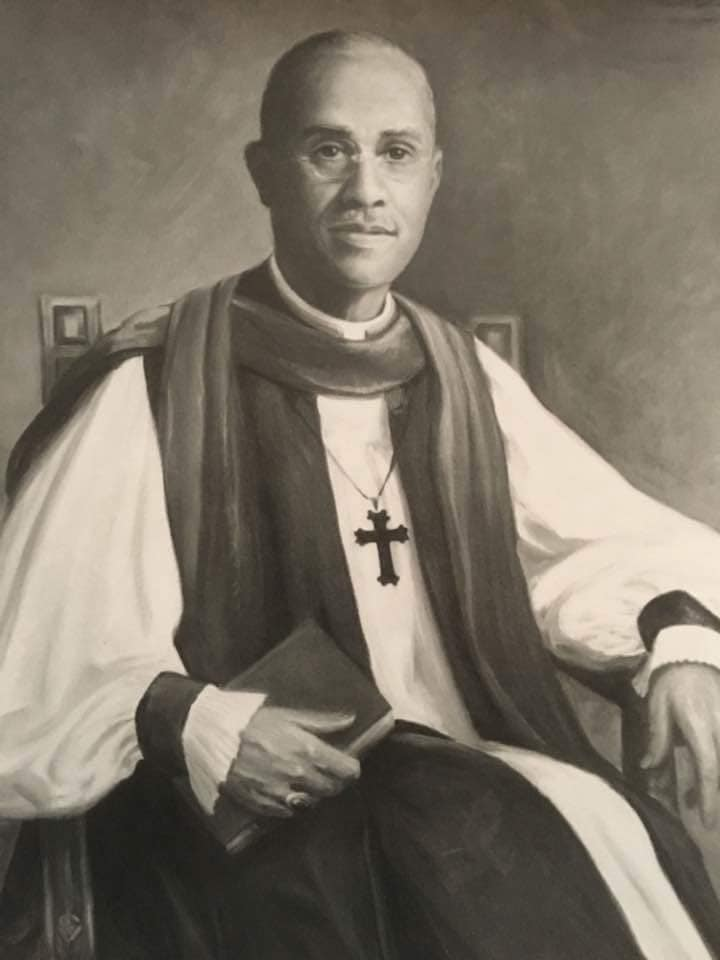
- Church: Episcopal Church
- Diocese: North Carolina
- Elected: May 15, 1918
- In office: 1918–1928
- Successor: W. Moultrie Moore, Jr.

Orders
- Ordination: May 2, 1892 by Theodore B. Lyman
- Consecration: November 21, 1918 by Joseph Blount Cheshire

Personal details
- Born: February 5, 1858 St. Marys, Georgia, United States
- Died: April 14, 1928 (aged 70) Raleigh, North Carolina, United States
- Buried: Mount Hope Cemetery (Raleigh, North Carolina)
- Denomination: Episcopal (prev. Methodist)
- Parents: Thomas & Sarah Delany
- Spouse: Nanette James Logan
- Children: 10
- Education: St Augustine's College

Henry Beard Delany (February 5, 1858 – April 14, 1928) was an American clergyman and the first African-American person elected Bishop Suffragan of the Episcopal Church in the United States.

== Early life ==
Henry Delany was born into slavery in St. Mary's, Georgia, in 1858. His parents were Thomas Delany, a ship and house carpenter, and Sarah, a house servant to a Methodist family in that town. After the American Civil War and emancipation, the family moved to Fernandina Beach, Florida. There young Delany learned bricklaying, plastery and carpentry from his father, and also helped on the family farm. He attended a school funded by the Freedmen's Bureau and staffed by missionaries.

In 1881, the rector of St. Peter's Episcopal Church in that town, the Rev. Owen Thackera, funded a scholarship to allow Delany to attend St. Augustine's College in Raleigh, North Carolina. Episcopal priests had founded the college in 1867 to educate newly freed men and women. There, Delany studied theology, music and other subjects.

== Career ==
Upon graduating in 1885, Delany joined the faculty at St. Augustine's, where he served until 1908. He taught carpentry and masonry and supervised building projects, as well as (after the ordinations discussed below) serving as the school's vice-principal (1889-1908), chaplain and musician. Although not trained as an architect, Delany is credited as the architect and builder of the Norman Gothic-style historic chapel, which was crafted in part from stone quarried on campus. Delany and the students also built a library in 1898, and St. Agnes' Hospital on the College campus. (Completed in 1909, it was the only hospital serving blacks in the area until 1940.)

Delany joined Raleigh's St. Ambrose Episcopal Church, where he was ordained a deacon in 1889 and a priest in 1892.

From 1889 to 1904, Delany served on the national church's Commission for Work among Colored People. He visited Episcopal, Methodist, Baptist and African Methodist Episcopal (AME) congregations as well as organized schools and met with and arranged educational opportunities for prisoners. Upon being appointed Archdeacon for Negro Work in the Diocese of North Carolina, Delany resigned his position at the college. He continued to live on campus, as his wife continued to teach and serve as the college's matron. Raleigh's Shaw University awarded him an honorary degree in 1911 for his educational activities.

Delany was unanimously elected suffragan bishop for Negro Work at the North Carolina diocesan convention, and consecrated in 1918. He also agreed to assist the bishops of East and Western North Carolina, South Carolina and Upper South Carolina in establishing separate black parishes pursuant to the Jim Crow laws predominant in the south. Bishop Delany advocated keeping African-American Episcopalians united within the Church despite those segregationist practices within the Church and society.

== Death ==
Bishop Delany died at his campus home in 1928, aged 70. After a memorial ceremony in the chapel he had helped build, he was buried at Mount Hope Cemetery in Raleigh.

== Family ==
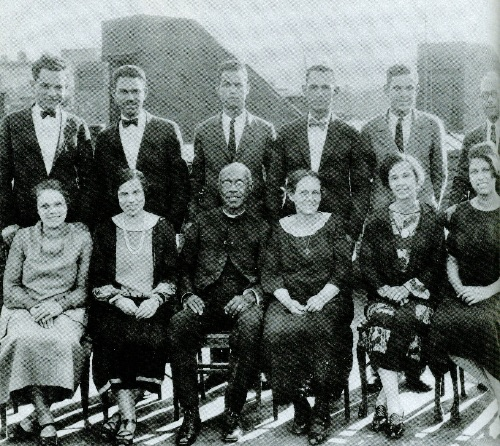
Delany Family on Harlem Rooftop [circa 1921]

Delany married his class valedictorian (and fellow St. Augustine's College faculty member) Nannie James (1861–1956) of Danville, Virginia, in 1886. They had ten children, including long-lived civil rights pioneers Sadie and Bessie Delany, who had landmark careers in New York. They were also subjects of the autobiographical oral history bestseller Having Our Say and became famous at the ages of 103 and 101, respectively.

His son Hubert Thomas Delany became one of the first appointed African-American judges in New York City. Later in his long and distinguished career, he served as legal advisor to many prominent civil rights activists. His youngest son, Samuel, was the father of prominent science fiction author, critic, and educator Samuel R. Delany, Jr., who has won numerous major awards in literature.

Children

- Lemuel Thackara Delany (1887–1956)
- Sarah Louise Delany (1889–1999)
- Annie Elizabeth Delany (1891–1995)
- Julia Emery Delany (1893–1974)
- The Rev. Henry Delany, Jr. (1895–1991)
- Lucius Delany (1897–1969)
- William Manross Delany (1899–1955)
- Hubert Thomas Delany (1901–1990)
- Laura Edith Delany (1903–1993)
- Samuel Ray Delany (1906–1960)

== Bibliography ==
- Delany, Sarah Louise; Delany, Annie Elizabeth; Hearth, Amy Hill (1993). Having Our Say: The Delany Sisters' First 100 Years (1st ed.). New York: Kodansha International. ISBN 1-56836-010-X. OCLC 633132768.
- Bragg, George F. (1904). Afro-American Church Work and Workers. Baltimore, MD: Church Advocate Print. OCLC 1376943 – via Internet Archive.
- Episcopal Clerical Directory. New York, New York: The Church Hymnal Corporation. 1926.
- Halliburton, Cecil D. (1937). A History of St. Augustine's College 1867-1937. Raleigh, NC: Edwards and Broughton Company. OCLC 514019.

Episcopal Church (USA) titles
First	1st Bishop Suffragan of North Carolina; 1918–1928	Vacant Title next held by Moultrie Moore
