= Camille Cosby =

American writer and television producer (born 1944)

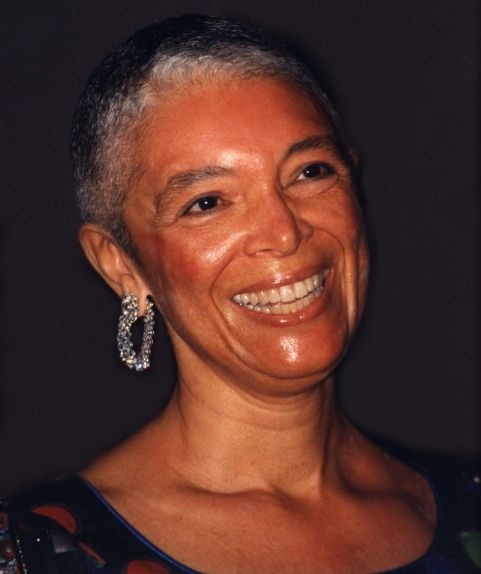
- Cosby in 1998
- Born: Camille Olivia Hanks; March 20, 1944 (age 82); Washington, D.C., U.S.
- Education: University of Maryland (BA, MA); University of Massachusetts Amherst (Ed.D.)
- Occupations: Television producer; author; philanthropist
- Years active: 1986–present
- Known for: Philanthropy
- Spouse: Bill Cosby (m. 1964)
- Children: 5, including Erika and Ennis
- Awards: Candace Award (1992)

Camille Olivia Cosby (née Hanks; born March 20, 1944) is an American television producer, philanthropist, and the wife of comedian Bill Cosby. The character of Clair Huxtable from The Cosby Show was based on her. Cosby has avoided public life, but has been active in her husband's businesses as a manager, as well as involving herself in academia and writing. In 1990, Cosby earned a master's degree from the University of Massachusetts Amherst, followed by a Doctorate of Education (Ed.D.) in 1992.

== Early life and education ==
Camille Olivia Hanks was born on March 20, 1944, in Washington D.C., to Guy A. Hanks Sr. and Catherine C. Hanks and grew up in Norbeck, Maryland, just outside Washington. She is the oldest of four children. Hanks's father was a chemist at Walter Reed General Hospital and her mother worked at a nursery. Both her parents had college educations, with her father earning a graduate degree from Fisk University and her mother earning an undergraduate degree from Howard University.

Cosby attended private Catholic schools. First, she attended St. Cyprian's, followed by St. Cecilia's Academy. Cosby stated,

"The Oblate Sisters were my first formal educators. They did what all educators should do, that is, convey the knowledge of wide-ranging possibilities, and, more importantly, give a stamp of self-value for every single student."

After high school, Cosby studied psychology at the University of Maryland, where she met her future husband, Bill Cosby.

In 1987, Howard University in Washington, D.C., presented Cosby with a Doctor of Humane Letters, an honorary doctoral degree.

In 1990, Cosby earned a master's degree from the University of Massachusetts Amherst, followed by a Doctorate of Education (Ed.D.) in 1992. In a 2014 interview with Oprah Winfrey, she said:

"I became keenly aware of myself in my mid-thirties. I went through a transition. I decided to go back to school, because I had dropped out of college to marry Bill when I was 19. I had five children, and I decided to go back. I didn't feel fulfilled educationally. I dropped out of school at the end of my sophomore year. So I went back, and when I did, my self-esteem grew. I got my master's, then decided to get my doctoral degree. Education helped me to come out of myself."

== Career ==
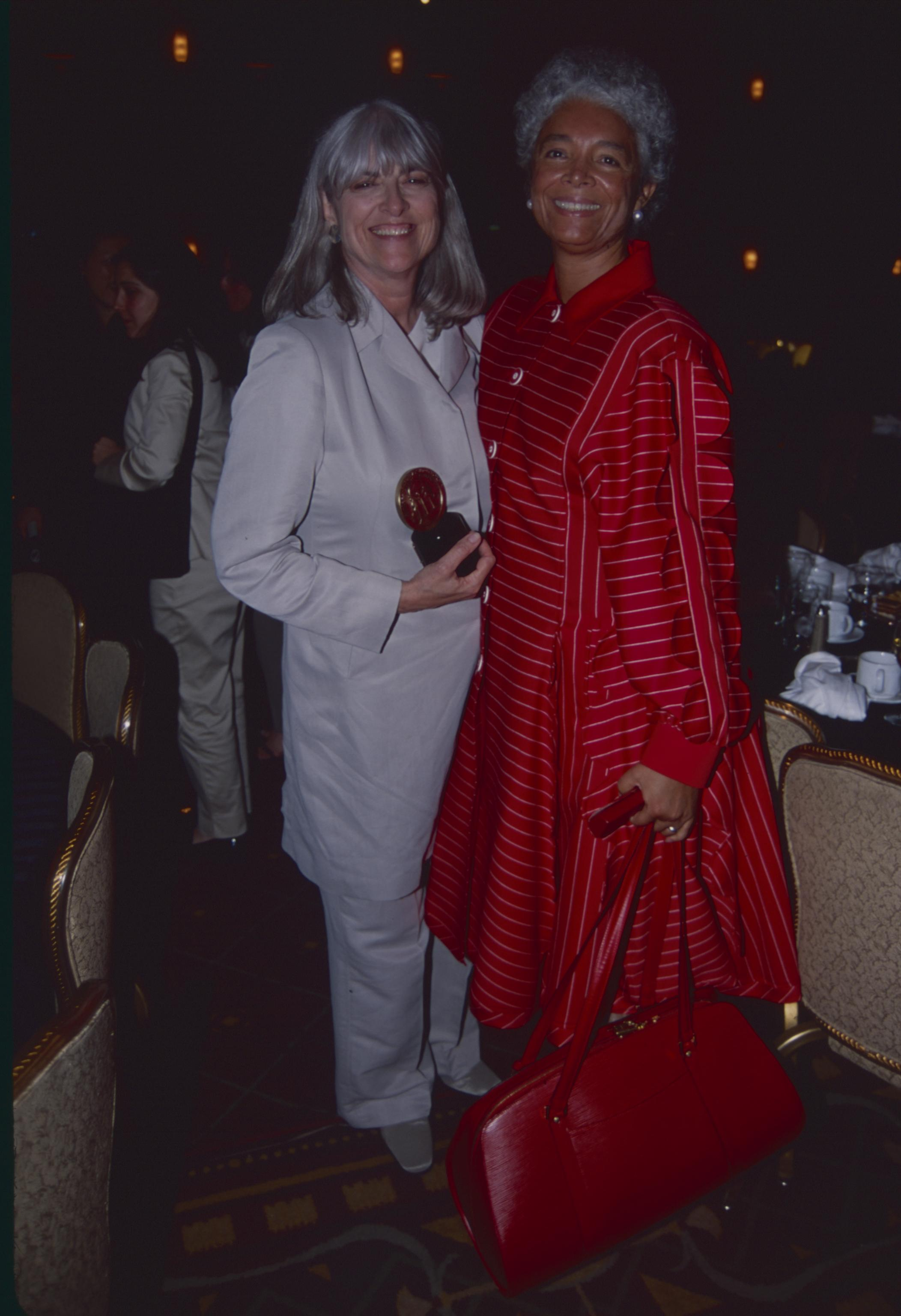
Judith James (left) and Cosby (right) at the 59th Annual Peabody Awards (2000)

Cosby has avoided public life. She acted as manager for her husband and has been depicted as a "shrewd businesswoman". During an interview with Ebony, Bill Cosby stated: "People would rather deal with me than with Camille. She's rough to deal with when it comes to my business." She also "help[ed] in the development of her husband's material", including suggestions for The Cosby Show, such as suggesting the Huxtable family be middle- rather than working-class. The character of Clair Huxtable from The Cosby Show was based on her.

Cosby supports African-American literature, and has written forewords for several books: in 1993, for Thelma Williams' Our Family Table: Recipes and Food Memories from African-American Life Models; in 2009, for Dear Success Seeker: Wisdom from Outstanding Women by Michele R. Wright; and in 2014, for The Man from Essence: Creating a Magazine for Black Women, a book by Edward Lewis of Essence.

In 1994, Cosby released Television's Imageable Influences: The Self-Perception of Young African-Americans, a book that "dramatically charts the damaging impact of derogatory images of African Americans produced in our media establishments". The book was originally intended to be the subject of her thesis for her doctoral degree.

Cosby worked with David C. Driskell on his book The Other Side of Color: African American Art in the Collection of Camille O. and William H. Cosby Jr., which focused on the Cosbys' art collection in 2001. Together, Cosby and Renee Poussaint edited A Wealth of Wisdom: Legendary African American Elders Speak in 2004.

In 2001, Cosby was a co-founder of the National Visionary Leadership Project, a group whose mission is to "develop the next generation of leaders by recording, preserving, and sharing the stories of extraordinary African American elders".

Cosby was co-producer for the Broadway play Having Our Say: The Delany Sisters' First 100 Years, based on the 1993 book of the same name by Sarah "Sadie" L. Delany and A. Elizabeth "Bessie" Delany with Amy Hill Hearth. Following the success of the play, Cosby acquired the film, stage and television rights to the story and later acted as executive producer for the 1999 television movie of the same name.

== Philanthropy ==
Cosby's history of philanthropy includes donations to schools and educational foundations. Her philanthropic memberships include Operation PUSH, The United Negro College Fund, the Southern Christian Leadership Conference, the National Council of Negro Women, and Jesse Jackson's National Rainbow Coalition.

Beginning at the start of the 1980s, Cosby and her husband donated $100,000 to Central State University (CSU), a historically black university in Ohio, with a second gift of $325,000 in 1987. In September 1989, CSU held the "Camille and Bill Cosby Cleveland Football Classic" in honor of their contributions to the school.

In January 1987, the Cosbys donated $1.3 million to Fisk University. In November 1988, they donated $20 million to Atlanta's Spelman College, a top Historically Black women's college. According to The New York Times, the gift was the largest donation to a black college in American history. The college has since named the five-story 92,000-square-foot Camille Olivia Hanks Cosby Academic Center after her, as well as designating a Camille Cosby Day. A few months after the Spelman donation, Cosby and her husband donated $800,000 to Meharry Medical College and $750,000 to Bethune-Cookman University.

In July 1992, during a gala held at the Metropolitan Museum of Art, the National Coalition of 100 Black Women awarded Cosby the Candace Award, a recognition of minority women who have made valuable contributions to their communities. In April 2005, Cosby donated $2 million to St. Frances Academy, a Black Catholic high school in Baltimore. Because of the donation, the school could endow 16 scholarships in Cosby's name.

== Bill Cosby sexual assault cases ==
Cosby has defended her husband against accusations that he has sexually assaulted women over his career. In 2014, Cosby released a statement saying that her husband had been the victim of unvetted accusations: "The man I met, and fell in love with, and whom I continue to love, is the man you all knew through his work. He is a kind man ... and a wonderful husband, father and friend."

On December 9, 2015, attorney Joseph Cammarata subpoenaed Cosby to give a deposition in a defamation lawsuit filed against her husband by seven women. A U.S. Magistrate Judge later dismissed her motion to squash the subpoena, and she was ordered to testify under oath. In the deposition of February 2016, Cosby invoked spousal privilege when asked whether Bill had been faithful to her. Cosby's support of her husband has been questioned; in The Progressive Revolution, author Ellis Washington wrote: "...I am transfixed by the slavish complicity and psychotic denial of Camille" positing that she may be "the greatest sexual sociopath sympathizer in history".

After her husband's conviction for sexual assault on May 3, 2018, Cosby released a three-page statement defending her husband, in which she compared his conviction to the racially charged killing of Emmett Till, a 14-year-old boy who was lynched after a white woman said she was offended by him in her family's grocery store. Cosby also called for a criminal investigation into the Pennsylvania prosecutor behind the conviction and argued that her husband had a "binding agreement" with Bruce Castor that he would not be charged in the case. The Undefeated stated: "Camille Cosby's words show she's trapped in an outdated space." HuffPost called the statement "bizarre".

== Personal life ==
While studying at the University of Maryland, Cosby went on a blind date during her sophomore year with Bill. Engaged shortly after they began dating, the pair married on January 25, 1964.

Following their marriage, Cosby and her husband had five children: Erika (born 1965), Erinn (born 1966), Ennis (April 15, 1969 – January 16, 1997), Ensa (April 8, 1973 – February 23, 2018), and Evin (born 1976).

Ennis was murdered on January 16, 1997, at the age of 27. After his murder, Cosby wrote a letter to USA Today titled "America Taught My Son's Killer to Hate Blacks", in which she "excoriat[ed] America for teaching her son's murderer the bigotry that fueled his lethal act." The controversial letter was not well received by pundits or the press. Authors Stephan and Abigail Thernstrom wrote that they believed Cosby's article was "misguided despair ... [that] threatens further progress" in the development of race relations in the United States.

Cosby's daughter Ensa died February 23, 2018, of renal disease while awaiting a kidney transplant at the age of 44.

In 1982, Cosby joined the Reverend Jesse Jackson and his wife Jacqueline Jackson, congressman William H. Gray III, and historian Mary Frances Berry to meet Pope John Paul II at the Vatican, where the group was pictured with the pope.

Along with Bill, Cosby was featured on the cover of Ebony's September 1966 issue. In 1996, she was named one of the "15 most beautiful Black women" by the magazine.

=== Art collection ===
Cosby is an avid art collector, including African-American-made quilts. In her personal collection she has multiple works by Ellis Ruley. She has been the subject of multiple portraits by artist Simmie Knox. In December 1981, Cosby purchased Henry Ossawa Tanner's The Thankful Poor at Sotheby's, and gave to her husband for a Christmas gift.

== Filmography ==
Year	Title	Credit	Notes
1986	The Cosby Show	Extra (uncredited)	Episode: "Off to the Races"
1987	Bill Cosby: 49	Director	
1994	No Dreams Deferred	Executive producer	
1994	The American Experience	Special funding	Episode: "Malcolm X: Make It Plain"
1996	Bill Cosby: Mr. Sapolsky, with Love	Co-executive producer	
1997	10th Anniversary Essence Awards	Self	
1999	Having Our Say: The Delany Sisters' First 100 Years	Executive Producer, extra (uncredited)	Television movie
2000	The Oprah Winfrey Show	Self	Episode: November 27, 2000
2000	Ennis' Gift	Executive producer	Documentary film
2001	Being Bill Cosby	Self	
2002	Sylvia's Path	Executive producer	Television movie
2004	Fatherhood	Special thanks	
2004	Fat Albert	Executive producer	
2010	Queen Victoria's Wedding	Special thanks	Film short
2010–2012	OBKB	Executive producer	
2014	Extra	Self	Archive footage – Episode #21.55
2014	CNN Newsroom	Self	Archive footage – November 21, 2014 episode
2014	OMG Insider	Self	Archive footage – December 16, 2014 episode
