= St. Augustine's University Historic Chapel =

Chapel in Raleigh, North Carolina, US

St. Augustine's Chapel
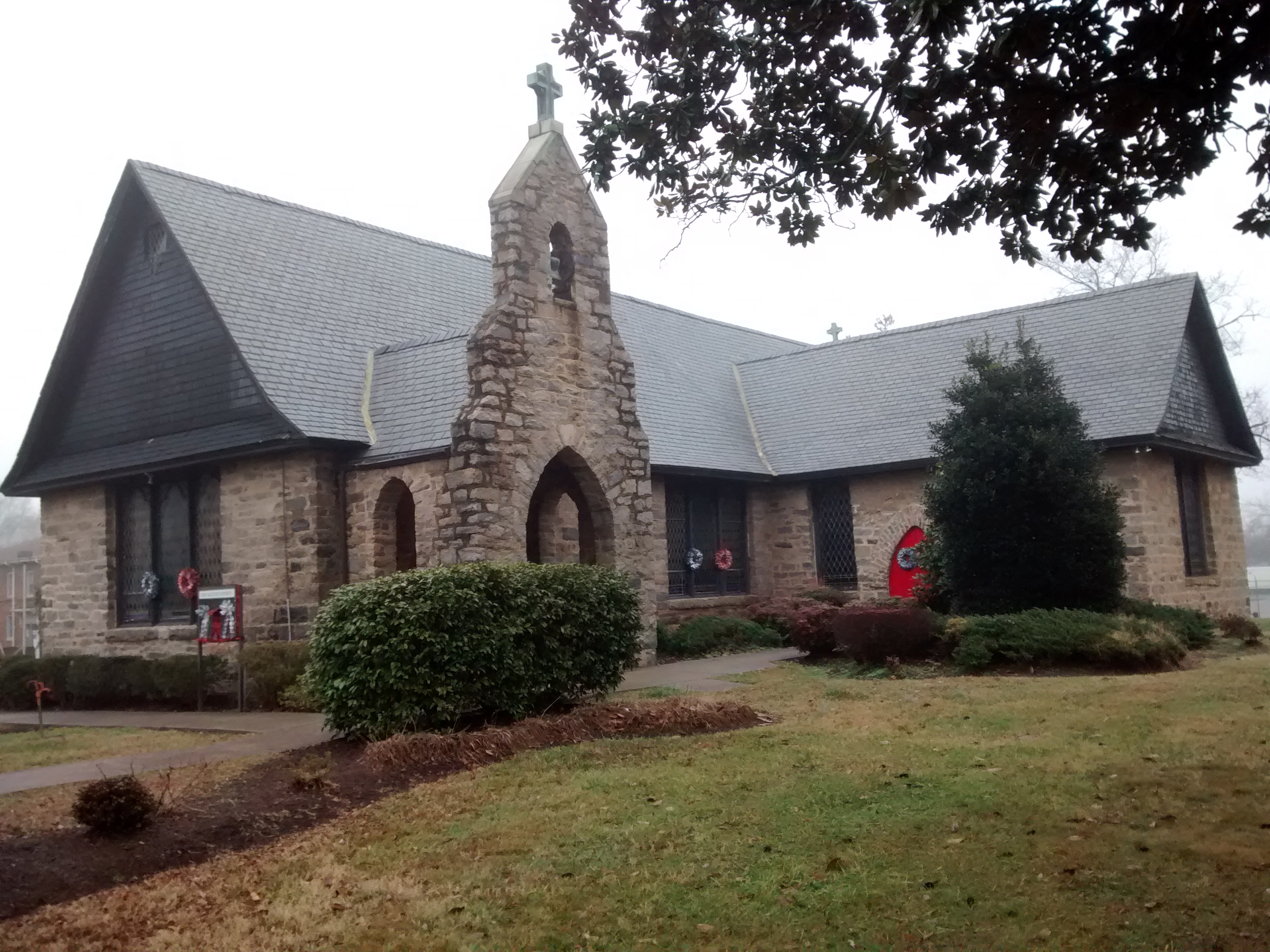

Religion
- Affiliation: Episcopal Church of the United States
- District: Episcopal Diocese of North Carolina
- Ecclesiastical or organisational status: Episcopal polity
- Status: Chapel

Location
- Location: Raleigh, North Carolina, United States
- Interactive map of St. Augustine's Chapel

Saint Augustine's University Historic Chapel is a historic Episcopal chapel located on the campus of St. Augustine's University near downtown Raleigh, North Carolina. Built in 1895, it is one of the oldest buildings on the campus of St. Augustine's and has been designated as a Raleigh Historic Landmark. The building was also included as a contributing property to the St. Augustine's College Campus historic district, listed on the National Register of Historic Places in 1980.

The chapel was built with the patronage of the Episcopal Church Freedmen's Bureau. Episcopal priest Rev. Henry Beard Delany directed the construction; at the time he was an instructor of carpentry and masonry, as well as a chaplain and musician. The chapel was built by students of the college using stone from the Raleigh area.

The chapel houses the cathedra of the Episcopal Bishop of North Carolina, a memorial of Henry Delany's consecration as the first African American Episcopal Bishop in North Carolina.

Saint Augustine's filed for Chapter 11 bankruptcy on April 27, 2026 due to its severe fiscal crisis. It additionally halted efforts to continue as an accredited institution, and will revert to unaccredited status after May 15.

== See also ==
- St. Mark's Chapel (Raleigh, North Carolina)
