= Heller Theatre =

The Heller Theatre in Tulsa, Oklahoma is the largest community theatre in Oklahoma. It was founded in October 1981 by Ken Spence with the partnership of Theatre Tulsa and has since produced more than one hundred shows including two dozen world premiers. The theater is currently directed by Julie Tattershall operated by the Tulsa Parks and Recreation Department.

The theater was named the Oklahoma Community Theatre Association (OCTA) Theater of the Year in 2005. The Great Plains debut of Yasmina Reza's “The Unexpected Man," translated by Christopher Hampton, received high honors from (OCTA) in 2007. Two of the Heller's most recent shows were named "Top Ten" performances of the Year by the Tulsa World.

The theater is also home to Oklahoma's oldest comedy troupe, The Laughing Matter Improv, founded in 1993, and Round the Bend Players, one of the nation's leading senior theaters. Its current directors are Rita Boyle and Sherry Zyskowski. Round the Bend's production of Jacob Appel's "The Three Belles of Eden" was a critic's pick in the Tulsa World.
