= Erika Cosby =

American painter (born 1965)

- Born: Erika Ranee Cosby; April 8, 1965 (age 61); Los Angeles, California, U.S.
- Education: Wesleyan University (BA); School of Visual Arts (BFA); University of California, Berkeley (MA); Skowhegan School of Painting and Sculpture
- Occupations: Artist; former professor at New York University (2012–2013)
- Known for: Paintings
- Parents: Bill Cosby (father); Camille Cosby (mother)
- Relatives: Ennis Cosby (brother)
- Website: erikaranee.com

Erika Ranee Cosby (born April 8, 1965) is an American painter. She is the daughter of philanthropist Camille Cosby and comedian Bill Cosby.

== Early life and education ==
Erika Ranee Cosby was born on April 8, 1965, in Los Angeles, California, the oldest of five children born to Camille Olivia (née Hanks) and William Henry Cosby, Jr. All five of the siblings' names began with E, for "excellence." Erika has two living siblings: sisters Erinn (b. 1966) and Evin (b. 1976). Her brother, Ennis Cosby (b. 1969), was murdered in 1997. Her younger sister, Ensa Cosby (b. 1973), died of kidney disease in 2018.

Following high school at Northfield Mount Hermon, Cosby attended Wesleyan University, graduating with a Bachelor of Arts degree in 1987. After Wesleyan, she attended the School of Visual Arts in New York City, earning a Bachelor of Fine Arts in 1989. She then attended the University of California, Berkeley and graduated in 1991 with a Masters of Fine Arts.

Following the completion of her MFA, Cosby attended the Skowhegan School of Painting and Sculpture in Maine for a nine-week summer residency course.

== Artistic career ==
David Driskell wrote that Cosby's artwork "concentrates on image perception, especially the media's debasing stereotypes that alter the realistic qualities of people through negative representation... Through the use of satire, metaphor, and allegory, her work examines the intent and the effect of these distorted images on African American culture." She focuses on abstract pieces.

Cosby was the recipient of a New York Foundation for the Arts Fellowship in Painting. From 2009 to 2010, she was an artist in residence at the Abrons Arts Center, and was awarded a studio grant from The Marie Walsh Sharpe Art Foundation in 2011.

In 2012, she was included in Jayson Musson and Marilyn Minter's group show at the New York's Family Business called "It's a Small, Small World."

During 2012 and 2013, Cosby worked as an adjunct art professor at New York University along with Huma Bhabha, Dike Blair, Wayne Koestenbaum and others.

One of her pieces, called Hanging Out To Dry, was shown at the 50th anniversary of the Smithsonian's National Museum of African Art in 2014. The painting was a large, bright, impressionist work. Cosby explained the painting with, "The positioning of the dolls hanging from a clothesline, in an upside-down trajectory as they are suspended in perpetuity, suggests an uncertain future status. The expressionistic paint rendering and predominant use of red are a visceral interpretation of the persistent and relentless distortion of black imagery in our culture." The gala was attended by her parents, Latanya Richardson Jackson, Samuel L. Jackson, Johnnetta Betsch Cole, and James Staton, among others.

In July 2015, Cosby was the curator of a pop-up group art show in artist Jennifer Coates' Brooklyn studio called "Eye Contact." It featured art by Cosby along with art from Rina Banerjee, Ellen Gallagher, Nina Chanel Abney, Ella Kruglyanskaya, David Armacost, Lauren Gidwitz, Scott Grodesky, and Ryan Schneider. Cosby stated, "I started thinking about eye imagery after watching marchers carrying artist JR's banner of Eric Garner’s cropped eyes."

Works by Cosby have been featured in galleries such as SALTWORKS Contemporary Art, the Arlington Arts Center, Slate Gallery, Artspace in New Haven, the Allegra LaViola Gallery, and The Last Brucennial.

Cosby is a benefactor of the summer institute for A Long Walk Home, an art-based sexual assault awareness program in Chicago, Illinois.
