= McCarter Theatre =

Theater on the campus of Princeton University

McCarter Theatre Center
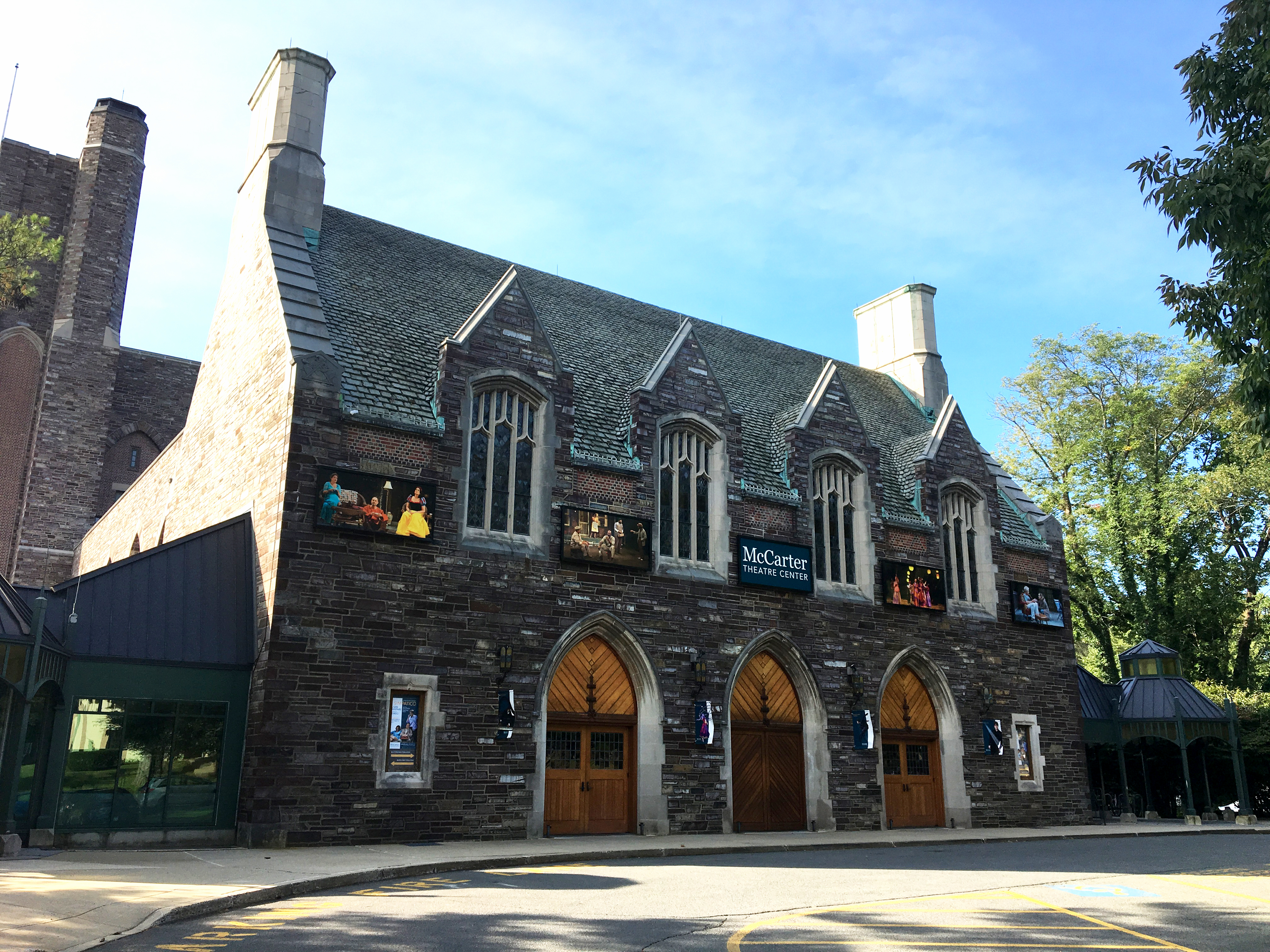
- The entrance of McCarter Theatre Center
- Interactive map of McCarter Theatre Center
- Address: 91 University Place; Princeton, New Jersey; United States
- Coordinates: 40°20′39.51″N 74°39′38.53″W
- Owner: Princeton University
- Operator: McCarter Theatre Center
- Type: Regional theater
- Public transit: Princeton (NJT station)

Construction
- Opened: February 21, 1930

Website
- www.mccarter.org

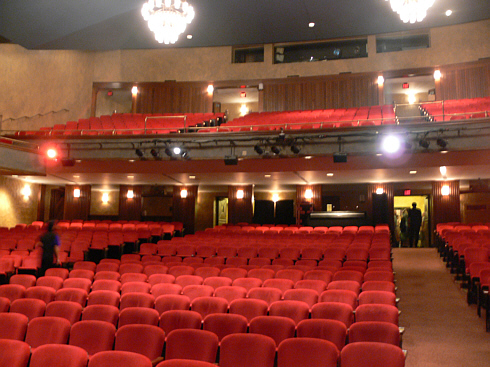
Main Auditorium of McCarter Theatre Center

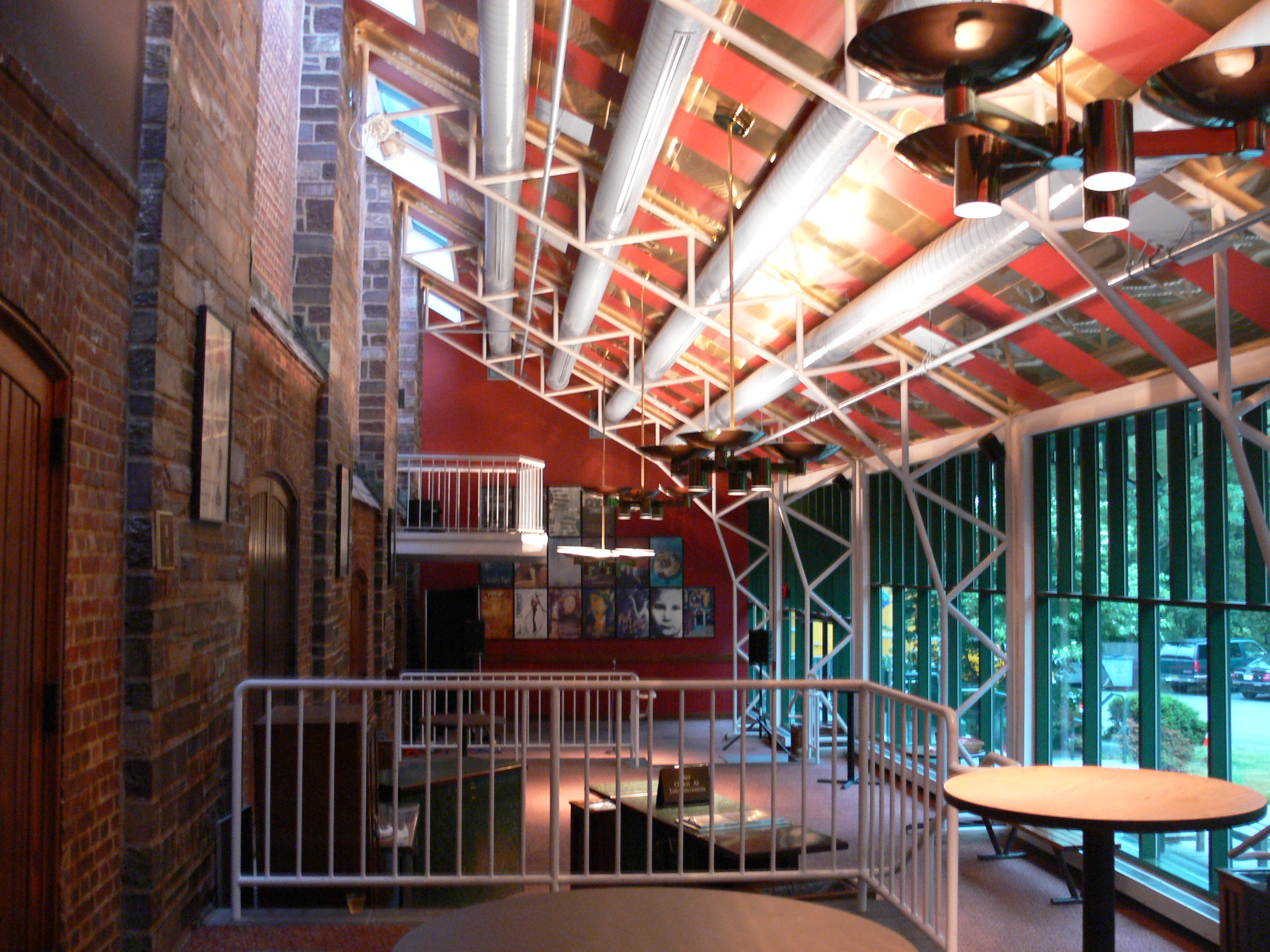
Foyers of McCarter Theatre Center

McCarter Theatre Center is a not-for-profit, professional company on the campus of Princeton University in Princeton, New Jersey. It was incorporated as a nonprofit in 1963. A two-time Tony Award winner, the McCarter's legacy traces back to the theatre's first performances in 1930. Thornton Wilder's Our Town, Kaufmann and Hart's You Can't Take It With You, and William Inge's Bus Stop all had their premieres on the McCarter stage.

== History ==
Built as a permanent home for the Princeton University Triangle Club (who continue to perform at McCarter) with funds from Thomas N. McCarter, class of 1888, McCarter Theatre opened on February 21, 1930, with a special performance of the 40th annual Triangle show, The Golden Dog. One of its stars was Joshua Logan, then a junior, and sophomore James Stewart was in the chorus; both went on to international fame.

During the 1930s, McCarter gained popularity as a pre-Broadway showcase, due to its large seating capacity, its 40-foot proscenium stage, and its short distance from New York. Thornton Wilder's Our Town had its world premiere at McCarter, as did George S. Kaufman and Moss Hart's You Can't Take It with You, James Thurber and Elliott Nugent's The Male Animal (starring Gene Tierney), Philip Barry's Without Love (starring Katharine Hepburn) and William Inge's Bus Stop (starring Kim Stanley and Elaine Stritch).

McCarter hosted the Princeton University Concerts for fifty years before they moved to Richardson Auditorium. The Philadelphia Orchestra began these concerts at McCarter in 1932, and the Cleveland Orchestra, the New York Philharmonic, Rudolf Serkin, Jascha Heifetz, Myra Hess, Zino Francescatti, and Gregor Piatigorsky followed, among others.

The first dancer to perform there was Ruth St. Denis, who appeared in a solo evening on March 7, 1930, and returned that same fall with Ted Shawn and the full troupe of the pioneering Denishawn dancers. Few others of significance followed, except for a single performance in 1935 by the American Ballet"– the first troupe of dancers assembled in this country by an émigré Russian choreographer named George Balanchine.

In the post World War II years, Broadway dropped out-of-town try-outs, so that the theatre could no longer be self-supporting. In 1950, Princeton University and the Triangle Club agreed that the university should acquire the building and assume responsibility for its operating costs. The season 1960–1961 saw the establishment of a new company producing original work under the artistic direction of Ellis Rabb. Actors in the new company included Rosemary Harris, Donald Moffat, Frances Sternhagen, and Edward Asner.

In 1963, Princeton University transferred its direct operation of McCarter to the McCarter Theatre Company, which was separately incorporated at that time. Executive Director Milton Lyon was followed most notably by Arthur Lithgow, Michael Kahn, and, in the role of artistic director, Nagle Jackson and Emily Mann. Mann's tenure as Artistic Director was notable for its emphasis on new work with playwrights including Athol Fugard. McCarter commissioned the production and premiered the performance of Vanya and Sonia and Masha and Spike by Christopher Durang, which went on to win the 2013 Tony Award for Best Play.

In the 1990s and early 2000s McCarter underwent major renovations and expansions including construction of a smaller second theater adjacent to the main auditorium (the Roger S. Berlind Theater, named for the Princeton graduate and producer), allowing two productions to be mounted simultaneously. The Berlind Theater (completed 2003) was designed by theater architect Hugh Hardy, who as a student had designed sets for productions by Theatre Intime and Triangle Club.

Artistic Director Sarah Rasmussen was appointed in late 2020; Executive Director Martin Miller joined the theatre in 2023. McCarter publicity claims that 100,000 community members participate in the company's work every year, among them 6,000 students.

It is a member company of the New Jersey Theatre Alliance.

== Theater series ==
Under former Artistic Director Emily Mann, noteworthy productions include the premieres of new plays by Athol Fugard, Edward Albee, Nilo Cruz, Christopher Durang, Regina Taylor, Beth Henley, Dael Orlandersmith, Steven Dietz, Marina Carr, John Henry Redwood, Eric Bogosian, Theresa Rebeck and Emily Mann. Many, including Having Our Say, Anna in the Tropics, Crowns, Valley Song and Yellowman, have gone on to be some of the most frequently produced plays in the American theater. In addition, McCarter is recognized for its re-investigations of the classic canon, including Stephen Wadsworth's adaptations of plays by Marivaux, David Leveaux's production of Electra, featuring Zoë Wanamaker, and Emily Mann's adaptations of Anton Chekhov's The Cherry Orchard and Uncle Vanya.

Two of its 2006–2007 productions, Translations and Radio Golf, moved to Broadway, where they were nominated for Tony Awards.
