= Theatre Tulsa =

- Formation: 1922
- Founders: Bonnie Reed and Hope Holway
- Headquarters: Tulsa, OK
- Executive Director: Travis Guillory
- Website: https://theatretulsa.org/

Theatre Tulsa, Inc. is a community theatre company in Tulsa, Oklahoma, United States.

== History ==
Theatre Tulsa, the longest-running community theatre west of the Mississippi and seventh in the nation, has had a prosperous but sometimes difficult history. The theatre has survived multiple wars, fires, and economic depressions. Theatre Tulsa started as a small community theatre that played shows in a tent, and grew to the largest community theatre in the nation in the 1970s, followed by years of decline and a recent re-invigoration that includes the new creation of a Broadway Series main stage season, a Next Stage series season composed of new works, and a Family Series season for children, families, and arts education programming.

Tulsa Little Theatre was incorporated December 10, 1922, by Mrs. Bonnie Reed and Mrs. Hope Holway. Despite the Great Depression, the group managed to raise money to build a theater, which was christened with a performance of The Cradle Song in February 1932. Two years later, the group incorporated as Tulsa Little Theatre. Struggling through the next few years, the theater survived a threatened bank foreclosure in 1935 after a number of donors stepped in, and in 1940 the theater paid off its mortgage. During World War II, it produced shows for military camps and veterans' hospitals. Tulsa Little Little Theatre prospered, and by 1959 was the largest non-professional theater company in the country. In 1964, its membership was 8,000 strong. By 1972 it had the largest community theater membership in the nation and had counted 1.5 million members over the previous 50 years. In 1974, Tulsa Little Theatre changed its name to Theatre Tulsa, Inc. Theatre Tulsa remains active today, producing 10 productions a year that include modern and classic dramas, comedies, and musicals.

Theatre Tulsa has had many firsts; it was the first community theater in the country to premiere Our Town (1939) and All My Sons (1947); the musical Brownstone(1985); Miracle on 34th Street: A Musical Adaptation (a 1993 original musical written for Theatre Tulsa); I Love You, You're Perfect, Now Change (2003); and the first American production of Pitmen Painters (2011). Theatre Tulsa's production of Forever Plaid sold out more than 400 shows in 1995 and 1996. Some noted performers, including Jeanne Tripplehorn, Kristin Chenoweth, and Sam Harris, received their first stage experience with Theatre Tulsa.
