= Annie Elizabeth Delany =

American dentist and civil rights pioneer (1891–1995)

- Born: September 3, 1891; Raleigh, North Carolina, U.S.
- Died: September 25, 1995 (aged 104); Mount Vernon, New York, U.S.
- Education: St. Augustine's College; Columbia School of Dental and Oral Surgery
- Occupations: Dentist and civil rights pioneer
- Known for: Being the second African-American female dentist licensed in New York State
- Parents: Henry Beard Delany (father); Nanny Logan (mother)
- Relatives: Sadie Delany (sister); Samuel R. Delany (nephew)
- Scientific career
- Fields: Dentistry

Annie Elizabeth "Bessie" Delany (September 3, 1891 – September 25, 1995) was an American dentist and civil rights pioneer. She was the subject, along with her elder sister, Sadie, of the oral history, Having Our Say: The Delany Sisters' First 100 Years (1993), written by journalist Amy Hill Hearth. Delany had earned a Doctor of Dental Surgery (DDS) degree from Columbia University in 1923, and was the second black woman licensed to practice dentistry in New York state. With the publication of the book, she became famous at the age of 101.

== Biography ==
Annie Elizabeth Delany was born on September 3, 1891, in Raleigh, North Carolina. She was the third of ten children born to the Rt. Rev. Henry Beard Delany (1858–1928), the first black person elected Bishop of the Episcopal Church in the United States, and Nanny (Logan) Delany (1861–1956), an educator. H. B. Delany was born into slavery in St. Marys, Georgia. Nanny Logan was born in a community then known as Yak, Virginia, seven miles from Danville.

Bessie was raised on the campus of St. Augustine's School (now University) in Raleigh, where her father was the vice principal and her mother, a teacher and administrator. Delany was a 1911 graduate of the school. In 1918, she followed her sister to New York City. She enrolled at Columbia University, from which she earned her dental degree in 1923. Of 170 students in her graduating class, she was the only black woman. She shared a dental office with her brother, Dr. H. B. Delany Jr., at 2305 Seventh Avenue, and later, 2303 Seventh Avenue, in Harlem. Throughout her life, Bessie Delany participated in many protests and marches, and encouraged civil rights organizers to meet at her and her brother's office.

== Death ==
Delany died at the age of 104 in Mount Vernon, New York, where she had long resided. She is interred at Mount Hope Cemetery in Raleigh, North Carolina.

== The Delany Sisters ==
In 1991, Delany and her sister Sadie were interviewed by journalist Amy Hill Hearth, who wrote a feature story about them for The New York Times ("Two 'Maiden Ladies' With Century-Old Stories to Tell"). A New York book publisher read Hearth's newspaper story and asked her to write a full-length book on the sisters. Hearth and the sisters worked closely for two years to create the book, Having our Say: The Delany Sisters' First 100 Years, which dealt with the trials and tribulations the sisters had faced during their century of life. The book was on The New York Times bestseller lists for 105 weeks. It was developed into a Broadway play written and directed by Emily Mann in 1995 and a television film in 1999. Both the play and film adaptations were produced by Judith R. James and Dr. Camille O. Cosby.

In 1994, the sisters and Hearth published The Delany Sisters' Book of Everyday Wisdom, a follow-up to Having Our Say. After Bessie's death, Sadie Delany and Hearth created a third book, On my Own at 107; Reflections on Life Without Bessie.

Her siblings were:

- Lemuel Thackara Delany (1887–1956)
- Sarah Louise ("Sadie") Delany (1889–1999)
- Julia Emery Delany (1893–1974)
- Henry Delany Jr. (1895–1991)
- Lucius Delany (1897–1969)
- William Manross Delany (1899–1955)
- Hubert Thomas Delany (1901–1990)
- Laura Edith Delany (1903–1993)
- Samuel Ray Delany (1906–1960)

== Bibliography ==
- Delany, Sarah L.; Delany, A. Elizabeth; Hearth, Amy Hill (1993). Having Our Say: The Delany Sisters' First 100 Years. New York: Kodansha America. ISBN 978-1-56836-010-2.
- Delany, Sarah L.; Delany, A. Elizabeth; Hearth, Amy Hill (1994). The Delany Sisters' Book of Everyday Wisdom. New York: Kodansha America. ISBN 978-1-56836-042-3.
- Delany, Sarah L.; Delany, A. Elizabeth; Hearth, Amy Hill (1997). On My Own at 107: Reflections on Life Without Bessie. San Francisco: Harper. ISBN 978-0-06-251485-1.
- "Sarah Louise "Sadie" Delany". Columbia250. Columbia University. 2008.
