= St. Agnes Hospital (Raleigh, North Carolina) =

Former Black hospital

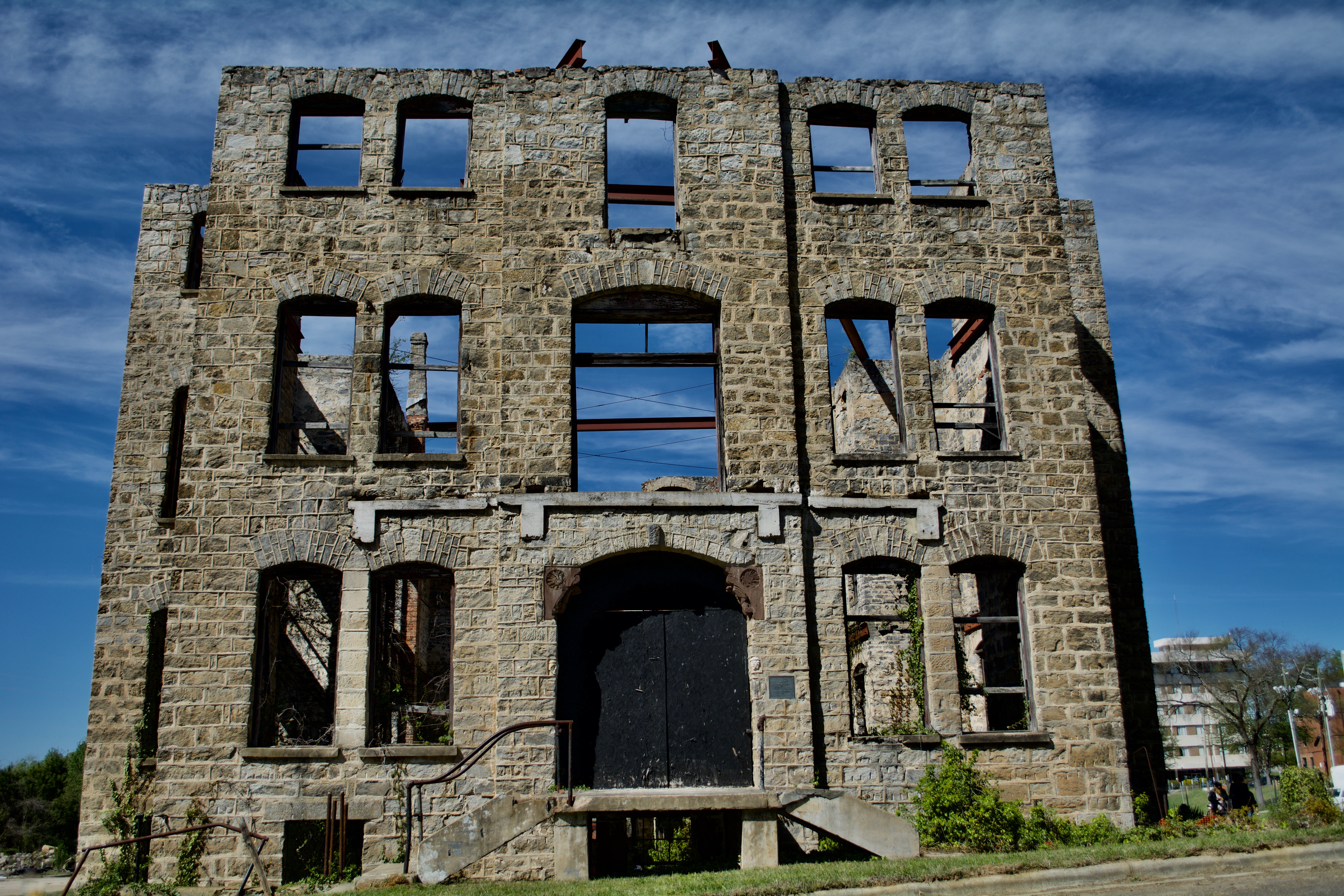
Ruins of St. Agnes Hospital's 1909 building on the campus of St. Augustine's University

St. Agnes Hospital was a private hospital in Raleigh, North Carolina, United States. Open from 1896 to 1961, it served the city's black residents. The hospital and an associated nursing school were founded after Aaron Burris Hunter and Sarah Hunter, instructors at St. Augustine's College, became concerned about the limited options local black residents had for medical care. Originally operating out of a former home on St, Augustine's campus, the hospital moved to a new four-story stone building in 1909. Together with St. Augustine's College, St. Agnes was managed by the college trustees until 1942, when it was incorporated as an independent hospital.

Largely reliant on philanthropic contributions, St. Agnes struggled to maintain adequate funding throughout its existence and served a large number of charity patients. Accredited by the American Medical Association and the American College of Surgeons, dozens of physicians and approximately 500 nurses were trained at the hospital. By the mid-1950s, the hospital was struggling to fund advancements needed to keep up with improving medical care and stricter accreditation standards. The hospital building was condemned in 1955 and the institution closed in April 1961 after Wake County opened a public hospital to treat both black and white patients. The main hospital building fell into ruins, and in 1979 it was declared a local historic landmark by the city of Raleigh.

== Creation ==
In 1867, Reverend Aaron Burris Hunter and his wife Sarah moved to Raleigh, North Carolina, to teach at St. Augustine's College, an Episcopal institution created for black freedmen and women in the aftermath of the American Civil War. Over the following decades as the school grew, the Hunters became increasingly concerned about the lack of medical care for black patients in the city. Funding for the creation of a hospital was provided by two donors, the Episcopal Church Women and I. L. Collins, who supplied $1,100 after an appeal from the Hunters.

== History ==
St. Agnes Hospital and Training School for Colored Nurses opened in the vacant former college president's residence on the campus of St. Augustine's College on October 18, 1896. The building also served as the housing for the hospital's nurses. At the time of its creation, the only other hospital care available for Raleigh's black residents were a small annex at Rex Hospital and the Leonard Hospital at Shaw University, which was open only during part of the year. Sarah Hunter acted as the hospital's first superintendent, while Dr. Lawson A. Scruggs, a Shaw graduate, served as the first attending physician. The hospital admitted its first patient the week after it opened and within six months had cared for 51 people, while its staff provided home care to 223 people. The staff performed their first surgery on April 6, 1897, and on April 21 of the following year, the nursing school hosted commencement for its first two graduates.

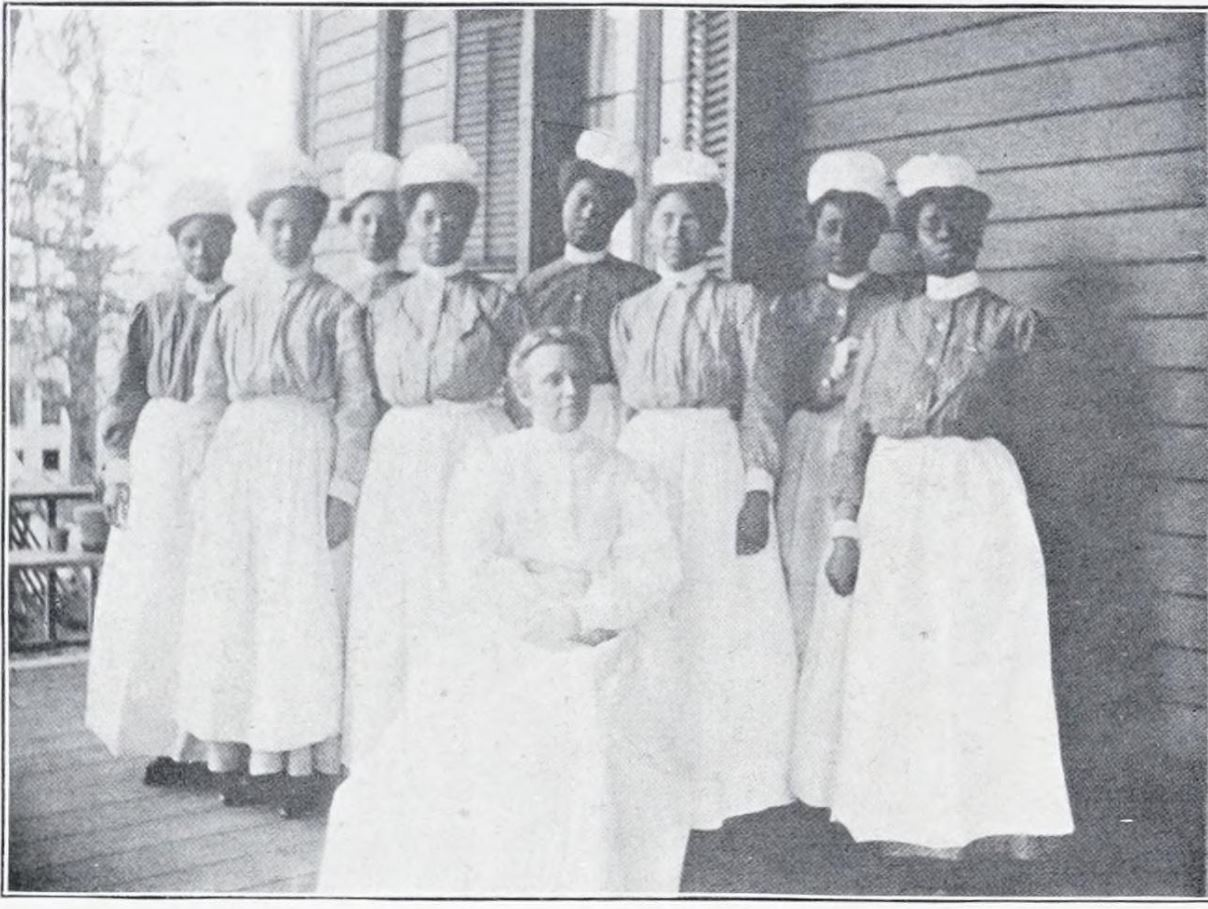
St. Agnes nurses, 1910

Two white doctors, Hubert Royster and Catherine Hayden, assumed leadership of St. Agnes at the turn of the century. In 1903, the hospital was expanded to include an additional operating room, sterilization room, kitchen, and two bathrooms. A fire in 1904 led to the decision to build a new hospital building. Most of the construction labor was provided by St. Augustine's students, who quarried the stone for the new, four-story structure, which cost approximately $15,000. Construction began in 1905. On February 1, 1909, the third story of the original hospital building caught fire due to a defective stove, causing an estimated $1,000 worth in damage. The Raleigh Fire Department suppressed the blaze while the hospital staff evacuated their 20 patients to temporary quarters.

The new hospital building opened in June 1909. Equipped with electricity and running water, it housed 75 beds and the nursing school. The nurses' quarters remained in the old building until 1930, when brick housing for them was constructed, and the original building became office space. Upon the new building's opening, Rex Hospital ceased treating black patients. In 1916 Shaw University closed Leonard Hospital, leaving St. Agnes the only hospital in Raleigh which would serve black patients. During the 1918 influenza pandemic, St. Agnes' nurses operated an emergency hospital to treat influenza patients. Several members of the hospital's training staff helped staff the McCauley Private Hospital when it opened in 1923. On December 17, 1926, the St. Agnes Hospital building was heavily damaged by a fire. Rendered uninhabitable, patients were relocated to McCauley Private Hospital while a fundraising campaign was conducted to restore the building. By 1941 St. Agnes hosted 100 beds. During World War II the nursing school participated in the Cadet Nurse Corps, and as a result the federal government funded improvements to the hospital. Up to this time, St. Agnes had been managed by St. Augustine's College. On January 1, 1942, a board of managers appointed by the Episcopal Diocese of North Carolina took charge of the hospital administration; on June 1, St. Agnes was officially incorporated, establishing its independence from the college.

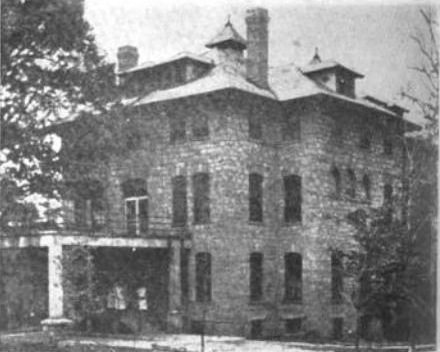
St. Agnes Hospital, 1923

The hospital struggled with acquiring funding for its operations throughout much of its history, especially due to the high frequency of charity patients. The Great Depression led donations and enrollments at the nursing school to decline, and patients who could not pay their own medical fees increased. Increased traffic from charity patients led the hospital to run a $27,000 deficit in 1947. In 1949 the city of Raleigh agreed to reimburse the hospital $4.50 per day for each charity patient it tended to. Aside from contributions from the city, the hospital also received philanthropic donations from the Duke Endowment, the Episcopal Church, the American Church Institute for Negroes, the Rosenwald Fund, and federal Hill–Burton grants. The institution was backed by Raleigh's white community; during one 1922 funding drive, it received contributions from the local rotary club, newspaper publisher Josephus Daniels, and members of a Ku Klux Klan chapter, who entered a fundraising committee meeting in their robes to hand over their donation.

Senior medical students from Shaw attended to cases at St. Agnes Hospital during its early years. Between 1932 and 1954, approximately 80 physicians were trained at the hospital. The institution received accreditation from the American Medical Association and the American College of Surgeons for training residents in medicine, surgery, obstetrics, and gynecology. Nursing students took required chemistry, sociology, and psychology courses at St. Augustine's in addition to their regular nursing curriculum and, by 1950, were sent on clinical rotations to Willard Parker Hospital in New York City and the Veterans Administration Hospital in Tuskegee, Alabama. For its high standards, the nursing school regularly received an "A" grade from the North Carolina Board of Nurse Examiners. The school closed in 1959, having trained an estimated 500 nurses during its existence.

In 1956, St. Agnes tended to an average of 80 patients per day. By that point, the hospital was struggling to fund itself in the face of advances in medical care and stricter accreditation standards. Donors could not supply the necessary funds to update the facilities, and only half of the patients could reimburse the hospital for their care themselves. In 1955 Wake County voters approved a bond referendum to fund the creation of the county's first public hospital, which would have segregated wings to treat both white and black patients. The same year, an inspection committee condemned the St. Agnes Hospital building, unanimously ruling it "a disgrace to the people of Raleigh and of Wake County [...] in considerably worse condition than any place ever inspected by the present grand jury". In 1959 a hired consultant determined "under no conception can it be imagined that this hospital can be renovated or expanded, using the basic structure that now exists". St. Agnes Hospital closed on April 27, 1961, as Wake Memorial Hospital opened to full operations, and all remaining patients were transferred.

== Fate of building ==
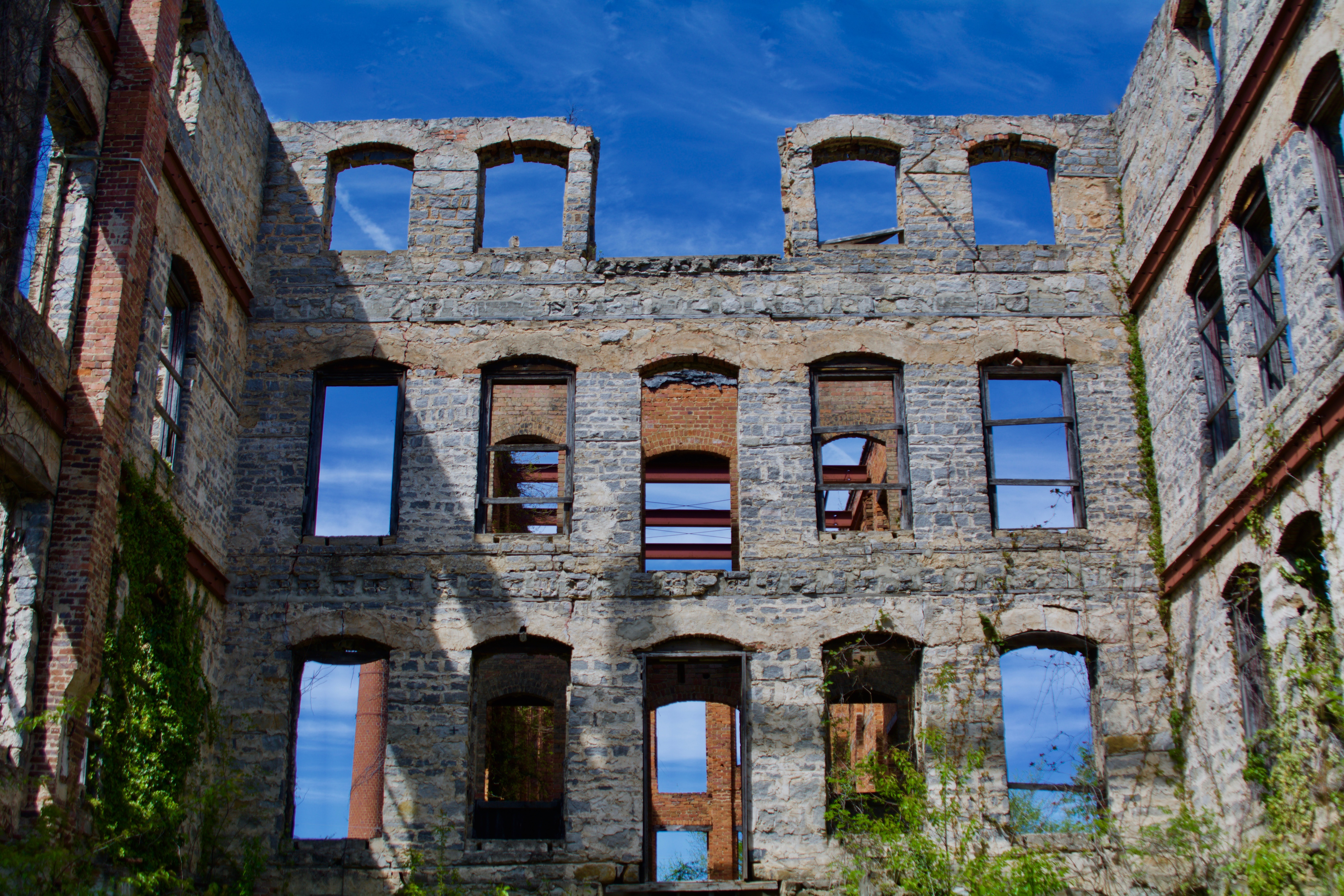
Interior ruins of St. Agnes Hospital, with steel beams visible

Upon the hospital's closure, its eight-acre site and four buildings were transferred to St. Augustine's College, which began using one nurse dormitory as housing for women students. In 1971 the main building housed the headquarters of Wake Opportunity's Senior Citizens Program. In 1979 it was designated a Raleigh Historic Landmark. The building was also included as a contributing property to the St. Augustine's College Campus historic district, listed on the National Register of Historic Places in 1980. By 1991 the building housed St. Augustine's security department and was used for storage by campus groundskeepers. A project to renovate the building and turn it into office and gallery space using grants was suspended in May 2001—by which point it had its internal features removed—after university officials decided to reconsider for what they wanted to use the building. Though they pledged to restart the project, the plan was suspended indefinitely as renovation costs grew and the school dealt with a lawsuit from one of the contractors on the project. Several efforts in the 21st century to consider repurposing the building led St. Augustine's to install steel beams to stabilize the building's stone façade. In 2022 a feasibility study was funded to determine whether the ruins could be preserved or renovated.

== Works cited ==
- de Miranda, Cynthia (July 2010), Leonard Medical Hospital (PDF), Raleigh Historic Landmark Designation Application, Raleigh: Raleigh Department of City Planning
- Johnson, K. Todd (2009). Historic Wake County (illustrated ed.). HPN Books. ISBN 9781935377108.
- Kenney, John A. (April 1919). "Some Facts Concerning Negro Nurse Training Schools and Their Graduates". Journal of the National Medical Association. 11 (2): 53–68. PMC 2622087. PMID 20891720.
- Pollitt, Phoebe Ann (2017). African American Hospitals in North Carolina: 39 Institutional Histories, 1880-1967. McFarland. ISBN 9781476630847.
- Pollitt, Phoebe Ann; Reese, Camille N. (February 2000). "St. Agnes School of Nursing: A legacy of Hope". ABNF Journal. 11 (1). Association of Black Nursing Faculty: 3–6. PMID 10876465. ProQuest 218874747
- Rice, Mitchell F.; Jones, Woodrow (1994). Public Policy and the Black Hospital: From Slavery to Segregation to Integration. Greenwood. ISBN 9780313263095.
- Thomas, Karen Kruse (2011). Deluxe Jim Crow: Civil Rights and American Health Policy, 1935-1954. University of Georgia Press. ISBN 9780820340449.
- Tucker, A. W. (1943). "Convention Reports". Report of St. Agnes Hospital. Journal of the One Hundred and Twenty-Seventh Annual Convention of the Protestant Episcopal Church in the Diocese of North Carolina (Report). Orange Printshop. pp. 117–119.
