= Having Our Say: The Delany Sisters' First 100 Years =

1993 book by Amy Hill Hearth

- Author: A. Elizabeth Delany; Sarah L. Delany; Amy Hill Hearth
- Language: English
- Subject: Biography/Oral History
- Publisher: Kodansha America
- Publication date: September 19, 1993
- Media type: Book/Audio
- Pages: 210
- ISBN: 978-1-56836-010-2
- OCLC: 28221947
- Dewey Decimal: 921–928
- Followed by: The Delany Sisters Book of Everyday Wisdom

Having Our Say: The Delany Sisters' First 100 Years is a 1993 New York Times bestselling book that was compiled by Amy Hill Hearth and contains the oral history of Sarah "Sadie" L. Delany and A. Elizabeth "Bessie" Delany, two civil rights pioneers who were born in the late 19th century to a former slave. Their stories were largely unknown until The New York Times reporter Amy Hill Hearth interviewed them for a feature story in 1991, and the popular story was expanded into book form.

Published by Kodansha America in New York in September 1993, the book was on the New York Times bestseller lists for 105 weeks. In all editions combined, the book has sold more than five million copies, according to Hearth. The book went on to inspire a Broadway play in 1995 and a CBS television film in 1999.

The book has been translated into six languages. In 1995, the book was recognized as one of the "Best Books of 1994" by the American Library Association. The book was also presented with the Christopher Award for Literature and an American Booksellers Book of the Year (ABBY) Honor Award.

== Creation ==
=== New York Times article ===
On September 22, 1991, an article written by Amy Hill Hearth ("Two 'Maiden Ladies' With Century-Old Stories to Tell"), was published in The New York Times, introducing the then-unknown Delany sisters to a large audience. Sarah "Sadie" L. Delany and A. Elizabeth "Bessie" Delany were two civil rights pioneers who were born to a former slave, and had many stories to share about their lives and experiences.

Among those who read Hearth's story was a New York book publisher who asked her to write a full-length book on the sisters. Hearth and the sisters agreed to collaborate, working closely for two years to create the book.

=== Book ===
Having Our Say: The Delany Sisters' First 100 Years was published by Kodansha America in New York in September 1993, and was on the New York Times bestseller lists for 105 weeks. The book documented the oral history of the Delany sisters and was compiled by the same New York Times reporter that created the original article, Amy Hill Hearth.

== Book synopsis ==
Having Our Say presents an historically accurate, nonfiction account of the trials and tribulations the Delany sisters faced during their century of life. The book offers positive images and details of African-American (they preferred "colored") life in the 1890s.

The book chronicles the story of their well-lived lives with wit and wisdom. It begins with an idyllic childhood in North Carolina. The sisters had a unique and privileged upbringing. They were raised on the campus of St. Augustine's School (now St. Augustine's University) in Raleigh, North Carolina. Their father, the Rev. Henry B. Delany, was the Vice-Principal of the school. He was born into slavery, but eventually became the first African-American Episcopal Bishop elected in the United States. Their mother, Nanny Logan, was a teacher and an administrator. Her parents were a free African American woman and a white Virginia farmer.

The legislation of Jim Crow laws eventually prompted the Delany sisters move to Harlem. Sadie arrived in New York in 1916, while Bessie relocated two years later.

The sisters were successful career women and civil rights pioneers in their own right. They survived encounters with racism and sexism in different ways, with the support of each other and their family. The sisters set their sights high, with both earning advanced college degrees at a time when this was very rare for women, especially women of color. Both were successful in their professions from the 1920s until retirement.

Sadie attended Pratt Institute, then transferred to Columbia University where she earned a bachelor's degree in education in 1920, followed by a master's in education in 1925. She was the first African-American permitted to teach Domestic Science at the high school level in the New York City public school system. She retired in 1960.

Bessie was a 1923 graduate of Columbia University's School of Dental and Oral Surgery. She was the second black woman licensed to practice dentistry in the state of New York. She retired in 1956.

The Delany sisters lived together in Harlem, New York, for many years, eventually moved to the Bronx while it was still rural, and finally moved to Mt. Vernon, New York, where they bought a house with a garden on a quiet street. Neither ever married, and the two lived together all of their lives.

The reason we've lived this long is because we never married. We never had husbands to worry us to death!

—Bessie Delany in Having Our Say

== Legacy ==
In all editions combined, the book has sold more than five million copies, according to Hearth. The book went on to inspire several plays, including a Broadway play in 1995 and a CBS television film in 1999.

The book has been translated into six languages. In 1995, the book was recognized as one of the "Best Books of 1994" by the American Library Association. The book was also presented with the Christopher Award for Literature and an American Booksellers Book of the Year (ABBY) Honor Award.

=== Follow-up books ===
After the publication of the book, the Delany sisters received numerous letters from people seeking advice, life direction, and encouragement. Raised with Southern charm, the sisters believed they should answer each and every letter. Etiquette gave way to practicality and the sisters, again with Hearth, wrote The Delany Sisters' Book of Everyday Wisdom. Published in 1994, the book offered recipes, as well as photos of the sisters doing yoga.

After Bessie's death in 1995 (aged 104), Sadie and Hearth wrote a third book, called On My Own At 107: Reflections on Life Without Bessie. The book follows Sadie through the first year after Bessie's death. It includes watercolor illustrations, by Brian M. Kotzky, of Bessie's favorite flowers from her garden. The book was a national bestseller.

In 2003, Hearth wrote The Delany Sisters Reach High, an illustrated children's biography of the Delany sisters, focusing on their childhood. Published by Abingdon Press, the book is illustrated by the award-winning artist, Tim Ladwig. It is part of the educational curriculum target for the first through third grade-reading classes.

=== Broadway play ===
In 1995, Emily Mann, artistic director of the McCarter Theatre in Princeton, New Jersey, adapted Hearth's book for the stage. The play adaptation, Having Our Say, debuted on April 6, 1995, at the Booth Theatre on Broadway in New York City. It later toured the United States.

=== Delany novella ===
In 1995, the Delany Sisters' nephew, novelist and critic Samuel R. Delany, published a novella, "Atlantis: Model 1924" (in Atlantis: Three Tales), which includes characters based on the two sisters, "Corey" and "Elsie." Samuel Delany did not interview his aunts about their histories, making them fictionalized family stories based on what he had heard, and those histories were not included in Having Our Say.

=== CBS telefilm ===
In 1999, Emily Mann, who had previously adapted the book to the Broadway stage, wrote a screenplay for CBS television. The executive producers included Camille O. Cosby, Jeffrey S. Grant, and Judith R. James. The telefilm starred Ruby Dee as Bessie Delany, Diahann Carroll as Sadie Delany, and Amy Madigan as Amy Hill Hearth. The film first aired on CBS on April 18, 1999, just three months after Sadie died at the age of 109. In 2000, the film was honored with the Peabody Award for Excellence in Television and the Christopher Award for Outstanding TV and Cable Programming.

== Awards and nominations ==
=== Original Broadway production ===
Year	Award	Category	Nominee	Result
1995	Tony Award	Best Play		Nominated
1995	Tony Award	Best Actress in a Play	Mary Alice	Nominated
1995	Tony Award	Best Direction of a Play	Emily Mann	Nominated
1995	Drama Desk Award	Outstanding Actress in a Play	Mary Alice	Nominated
1995	Drama Desk Award	Outstanding Direction of a Play	Emily Mann	Nominated
