= Sarah Louise Delany =

African-American educator and civil rights activist

- Born: September 19, 1889; Lynch's Station, Campbell County, Virginia, U.S.
- Died: January 25, 1999 (aged 109); Mount Vernon, New York, U.S.
- Other name: Sadie Delany
- Education: St. Augustine's College; Pratt Institute, A.A. Columbia University, B.A., M.A.
- Occupations: Educator, author, activist
- Parents: Henry Beard Delany (father); Nanny Logan Delany (mother)
- Family: Bessie Delany (sister); Samuel R. Delany (nephew)

Sarah Louise "Sadie" Delany (September 19, 1889 – January 25, 1999) was an American educator and civil rights pioneer. She was the subject, along with her younger sister Bessie, of the oral history biography, Having Our Say: The Delany Sisters' First 100 Years (1993), by journalist Amy Hill Hearth. Sadie was the first African American to teach domestic science at the high-school level in the New York public schools. With the publication of the book about the sisters, she became famous at the age of 103.

== Biography ==
Sarah Louise Delany was born on September 19, 1889, in Lynch's Station, Virginia. She was the second eldest of ten children born to the Rev. Henry Beard Delany (1858–1928), the first black person elected Bishop of the Episcopal Church in the United States, and Nanny Logan Delany (1861–1956), an educator. Rev. Delany was born into slavery in St. Mary's, Georgia. Nanny Logan Delany was born in a community then known as Yak, Virginia, seven miles from Danville.

Sadie Delany was born at the Lynch Station home of her mother's sister, Eliza Logan. She was raised on the campus of St. Augustine's School (now University) in Raleigh, North Carolina, where her father was the vice principal and her mother a teacher and administrator. Delany was a 1910 graduate of the school. In 1916, she moved to New York City, where she attended Pratt Institute in Brooklyn, then transferred to Columbia University, earning a bachelor's degree in education in 1920 and a master's of education in 1925. She was a New York City schoolteacher until her retirement in 1960. She was the first black person permitted to teach domestic science on the high-school level in New York City.

Delany died at the age of 109 in Mount Vernon, New York, where she resided in the final decades of her life. She is interred at Mount Hope Cemetery in Raleigh, North Carolina.

== The Delany Sisters ==
In 1991, Delany and her sister Bessie were interviewed by journalist Amy Hearth, who wrote a feature story about them for The New York Times ("Two 'Maiden Ladies' With Century-Old Stories to Tell"). A New York book publisher read Hearth's newspaper story and asked her to write a full-length book on the sisters. Hearth and the sisters worked closely for two years to create the book, an oral history titled Having Our Say: The Delany Sisters' First 100 Years, which dealt with the trials and tribulations the sisters had faced during their century of life. The book was on The New York Times bestseller lists for 105 weeks. It spawned a Broadway play in 1995 and a television film in 1999. Both the play and film adaptations were produced by Judith R. James and Dr. Camille O. Cosby.

In 1994, the sisters and Hearth published The Delany Sisters' Book of Everyday Wisdom, a follow-up to Having Our Say. After Bessie's death in 1995 at age 104, Sadie Delany and Hearth created a third book, On My Own At 107: Reflections on Life Without Bessie.

Her siblings were:

- Lemuel Thackara Delany (1887–1956)
- Annie Elizabeth ("Bessie") Delany (1891–1995)
- Julia Emery Delany (1893–1974)
- Henry Delany, Jr. (1895–1991)
- Lucius Delany (1897–1969)
- William Manross Delany (1899–1955)
- Hubert Thomas Delany (1901–1990)
- Laura Edith Delany (1903–1993)
- Samuel Ray Delany (1906–1965)

Delany was the aunt of science fiction writer Samuel R. Delany Jr., the son of her youngest brother.

== Sources ==
- Delany, Sarah L.; Delany, A. Elizabeth; Hearth, Amy Hill (1993). Having Our Say: The Delany Sisters' First 100 Years. New York: Kodansha America. ISBN 978-1-56836-010-2.
- Delany, Sarah L.; Delany, A. Elizabeth; Hearth, Amy Hill (1994). The Delany Sisters' Book of Everyday Wisdom. New York: Kodansha America. ISBN 978-1-56836-042-3.
- Delany, Sarah L.; Delany, A. Elizabeth; Hearth, Amy Hill (1997). On My Own at 107: Reflections on Life Without Bessie. San Francisco: Harper. ISBN 978-0-06-251485-1.
- "Sarah Louise "Sadie" Delany". Columbia250. Columbia University. 2008.
