= Amy Hill Hearth =

American journalist and author (born 1958)

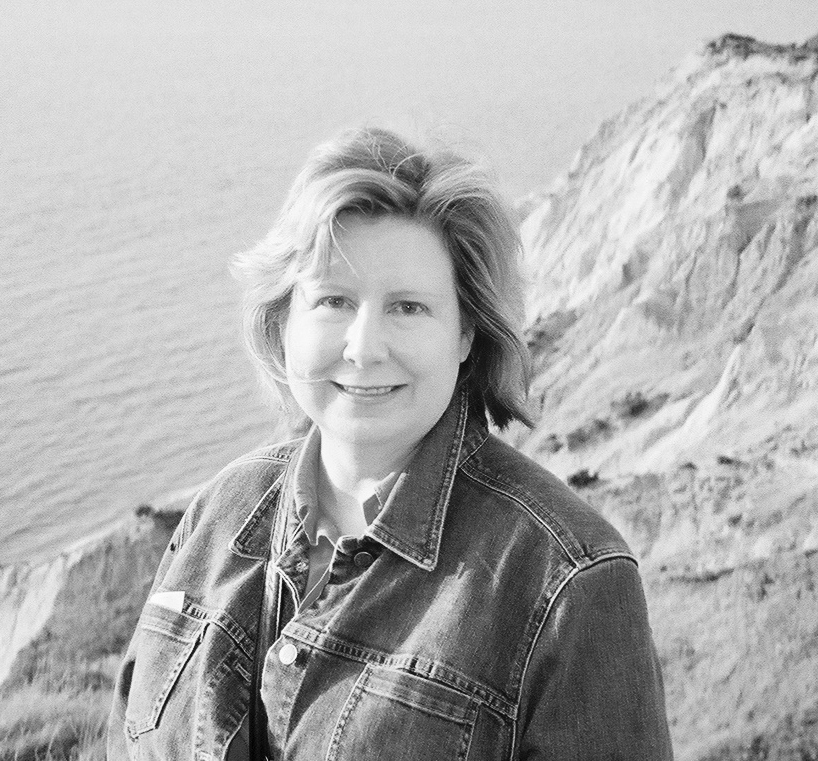
- Hearth in 2012
- Born: April 10, 1958 (age 68); Pittsfield, Massachusetts, U.S.
- Education: University of Massachusetts Amherst; University of Tampa (BA)
- Occupations: Author; journalist
- Writing career
- Notable work: Having Our Say: The Delany Sisters' First 100 Years (1993)

Amy Hill Hearth (pronounced "Harth", born April 10, 1958) is an American journalist and author who focuses on uniquely American stories and perspectives from the past. She is the author or co-author of eleven books, beginning in 1993 with the oral history Having Our Say: The Delany Sisters' First 100 Years, a New York Times bestseller for 117 weeks, according to its archives. The book was adapted for Broadway in 1995 and for a film in 1999.

Hearth has published both fiction and nonfiction, and books for adults as well as children. What her books all have in common is a fascination with American history. "Wherever Amy Hill Hearth turns her attention, history comes alive," author Peter Golden has said of Hearth.

Departing from her non-fiction work, Hearth wrote her first novel, Miss Dreamsville and the Collier County Women's Literary Society, in 2011. It was published on October 2, 2012, followed by a sequel, Miss Dreamsville and the Lost Heiress of Collier County, published September 8, 2015.

Hearth's tenth book, published January 2, 2018, is Streetcar to Justice: How Elizabeth Jennings Won the Right to Ride in New York. Written for middle-grade to adult readers, and published by HarperCollins/Greenwillow Books, the book is the first biography of civil rights pioneer Elizabeth Jennings Graham.

Hearth's most recent work is her first historical thriller, Silent Came the Monster: A Novel of the 1916 Jersey Shore Shark Attacks, published May 16, 2023.

== Life and career ==
Amy Hill Hearth was born in Pittsfield, Massachusetts, on April 10, 1958. Her family relocated several times during her childhood. She spent her formative years in Columbia, South Carolina, and her young adult years in Florida. She has lived, also, in Niskayuna, Hartsdale, and Ossining, N.Y.

She is a thirteenth-generation American whose ancestors fought for independence in the Revolutionary War. She has some Native American (Lenni-Lenape) ancestry as well, and was given the Native name "Smiling Songbird Woman" by the Nanticoke Lenni-Lenape Indians in a tribal ceremony in 2010 in honor of her oral history about their tribal matriarch, Strong Medicine Speaks: A Native American Elder Has Her Say.

She attended the University of Massachusetts at Amherst, majoring in Sociology, then transferred to the University of Tampa, Florida editing the college newspaper and earning a B.A. in Writing. Her first newspaper job was assistant arts and entertainment editor at The Berkshire Eagle in Pittsfield, Massachusetts, and her first full-time reporting job was at the Daytona Beach News-Journal in Florida. She met her future husband, a native of Naples, Florida, when she interviewed him for a story. Hearth relocated to the New York area, and subsequently wrote eighty-eight bylined news and feature stories for The New York Times. This included her article on the Delany Sisters, "Two Maiden Ladies with Stories to Tell".

Hearth is a college lecturer. In January 2012, for example, she was a visiting author at the University of Tampa, her alma mater. She and author Michael Connelly appeared together at what was billed by the university as its "Official Opening Reading" of the university's newly launched Master of Fine Arts in Creative Writing program.

She and her husband have lived in New Jersey since 1996.

== Having Our Say ==
Among Hearth's New York Times stories was a September 22, 1991, feature on a then-unknown pair of centenarian sisters, Sadie Delany and Bessie Delany, with the headline, "Two 'Maiden Ladies' With Century-Old Stories to Tell".

In an interview in the October–November 2007 issue of Book Women magazine, Hearth said that her interest in telling people's stories was the reason she tracked down the reclusive Delany sisters and asked for an interview. When she finally met them, they were reluctant to be interviewed. In a New York Times story published on April 2, 1995, she recalled:

They didn't think they were important enough. I had to convince them and gave this little impromptu speech - that I thought it was very important that people from their generation be represented, especially black women who hadn't had much opportunity. I guess my enthusiasm rubbed off.

Following the article's publication, Hearth was asked by Kodansha America, a book publisher, to expand it into a full-length biography. She decided, instead, to create an oral history and worked with the Delany sisters for almost two years to gather material for the book. The book was published in 1993. It became a New York Times Bestseller for 117 weeks and was also on the bestseller lists of The Washington Post, The Los Angeles Times, USA Today and Publishers Weekly.

Reflecting on her early career as a journalist, she said: "I did the hard stuff. I've been in a police car going 130 miles per hour chasing someone...but I always loved finding a feature where I could really get into someone's life story."

The Dallas Morning News, in its review of Having Our Say, wrote that Hearth: "worked carefully to preserve the speech patterns and personalities of each sister in the text so the stories unfold as complementary harmonies of the same melody.

With Hearth's contributions—she was credited as an advisor and production consultant—the books were adapted to the Broadway stage in 1995 and for film in 1999. The film version features the actress Amy Madigan playing the role of Hearth. For her work on the film, Hearth received a George Foster Peabody Award for Excellence in Broadcasting.

Hearth was one of two authors whose work was the subject of extensive analysis in the academic book Women Co-Authors. Author Holly A. Larid notes that the tone of Having Our Say is set when "Hearth writes in her preface, 'Their story, as the Delany sisters like to say, is not meant as "black" history or "women's" history but American history.'"

== Other works ==
In the 2009 Contemporary Authors feature on Hearth's career, she explained her writing process:

To me, the first step in the creation of an oral history is developing a relationship of trust with my subject. Then it is a matter of complete immersion in my subject's world, listening with an almost otherworldly intensity, asking the perfect questions, and being extremely sensitive to the nuances of what the person is telling me. While it goes without saying that I do scrupulous research and fact-checking for each project, what makes my books special, I think, is that I have an ear for capturing the authentic voice of my subject.

It was also noted in this feature that: "she had produced a number of other books and projects as a result of Having Our Say, but she has not limited herself to one story." Among her other works is 'Strong Medicine' Speaks : A Native American Elder Has Her Say: An Oral History, in which "Hearth delves into a different cultural experience".

A review of ′Strong Medicine′ Speaks by Publishers Weekly on January 31, 2008, described the way in which she crafts oral history: "Hearth works almost invisibly to craft a graceful, sustained look into the quiet struggles of contemporary Native Americans."

However, Hearth's oral history books also feature passages written in her own voice that are intended to provide historical and cultural context. A Kirkus Reviews review on December 15, 2007, of ′Strong Medicine′ Speaks referred specifically to these contextual passages written by Hearth: "As Hearth describes it, life [among the Native Americans] in Bridgeton, N.J., seems reminiscent of the rural idyll Thornton Wilder painted in Our Town."

An essay by Hearth on the Delany Sisters was commissioned for inclusion in the anthology, North Carolina Women: Their Lives and Times (Fall 2012, University of Georgia Press).

Her first work of fiction, Miss Dreamsville and the Collier County Women's Literary Society, was published by Atria Books/Simon & Schuster, in October 2012. Its sequel, Miss Dreamsville and the Lost Heiress of Collier County followed in September 2015. The books are loosely based on Hearth's late mother-in-law and her difficulties fitting in and adapting to Naples, Fla., then a sleepy Southern backwater, when the family moved from Boston in 1962. Both novels were translated into multiple languages.

In 2018, Hearth returned to nonfiction with her book, Streetcar to Justice: How Elizabeth Jennings Won the Right to Ride in New York. Written for middle-grade to adult readers, and published by HarperCollins/Greenwillow Books, the book is the first biography of civil rights pioneer Elizabeth Jennings Graham. The book received a Notable Book citation from the American Library Association, and a Junior Library Guild Gold Selection Award in spring 2018. In 2019, the book won the inaugural Septima Clark Award from the National Council for the Social Studies.

Hearth's first historical thriller, Silent Came the Monster: A novel of the 1916 Jersey Shore Shark Attacks, was published in May 2023. Historical Novel Society gave the novel high praise: "Well drawn and believable…this combination of historical events and thrilling suspense makes for a taut, compelling read."

== Awards and honors ==
Hearth, along with the producers, won a Peabody Award for "Significant and Meritorious Achievement in Broadcasting and Cable" for Having Our Say, the film adaptation of her book. Hearth, who was the consultant and advisor for historical accuracy on the film, received an individualized Peabody Award with her name and year.

Two of Hearth's books have been selected as "Notable Books" by the American Library Association: Having Our Say (adult category) and Streetcar to Justice (children's category). Having Our Say was selected as a 1994 Notable Book. Streetcar to Justice was selected as a 2019 Notable Children's Book.

In 1993, Having Our Say received an NAACP Image Award Nomination for Literature.

Hearth won the Inaugural Septima Clark "Women in Literature" Award in 2019 from the National Council for the Social Studies for her book, Streetcar to Justice. The annual award recognizes a "notable, high-quality trade book that centers on the challenges and accomplishments of women, both in the United States and internationally."

Having Our Say was selected for "One Book, One City" celebrations (citywide book reads) in numerous cities, including Washington, D.C., New Rochelle, N.Y., Columbia, South Carolina and Lawrence, Kansas. Strong Medicine Speaks: A Native American Elder Has Her Say was selected for a Cumberland County, New Jersey group read.

Four of Hearth's books have been selected by New York Public Library's "Best Books for the Teen Age." They are Having Our Say, The Delany Sisters' Book of Everyday Wisdom, On My Own, and In a World Gone Mad.

For Having Our Say, Hearth and the Delany Sisters won an "ABBY" Honor Book Award from the American Booksellers Association in 1994.

For the Broadway adaptation of Having Our Say, Hearth was part of the production team that was nominated for three Tony Awards, including Best Play, in 1995. The adaptation was written by Emily Mann. Hearth was a consultant and advisor whose role was to ensure the historical accuracy of the production.

Hearth and the Delany Sisters won a Christopher Award for Literature (1993) for Having Our Say. Six years later, the movie adaptation of the book won a Christopher Award for Film (1999). Hearth was a consultant and advisor on the film production.

Hearth received a Junior Library Guild Gold Standard Selection Award in 2018 for her book, Streetcar to Justice.

In 1993, Hearth received the Gwen and C. Dale White Award "for introducing the Delany Sisters to a world audience" from the New York Chapter of the Methodist Federation for Social Action.

== Bibliography ==
- Delany, Sarah L.; Delany, A. Elizabeth; Hearth, Amy Hill (1993). Having Our Say: The Delany Sisters' First 100 Years. New York: Kodansha America. ISBN 978-1-56836-010-2.
- Delany, Sarah L.; Delany, A. Elizabeth; Hearth, Amy Hill (1994). The Delany Sisters' Book of Everyday Wisdom. New York: Kodansha America. ISBN 978-1-56836-042-3.
- Delany, Sarah L.; Delany, A. Elizabeth; Hearth, Amy Hill (1997). On My Own at 107: Reflections on Life Without Bessie. San Francisco: Harper. ISBN 978-0-06-251485-1.
- Hearth, Amy Hill (2001). In a World Gone Mad: A Heroic Story of Love, Faith and Survival. Nashville: Abingdon Press. ISBN 0-687-09610-3.
- Hearth, Amy Hill (2003). The Delany Sisters Reach High. Abingdon Press. ISBN 978-0-687-03074-3.
- Hearth, Amy Hill (2008). 'Strong Medicine' Speaks: A Native American Elder Has Her Say: an Oral History. New York: Atria Books/Simon & Schuster. ISBN 978-1-4767-8633-9.
- Hearth, Amy Hill (2012). Miss Dreamsville and the Collier County Women's Literary Society. New York: Atria Books/Simon & Schuster. ISBN 978-1-4516-7523-8.
- Hearth, Amy Hill (2015). Miss Dreamsville and the Lost Heiress of Collier County. New York: Atria Books/Simon & Schuster. ISBN 978-1-4767-6574-7.
- Hearth, Amy Hill (2018). Streetcar to Justice: How Elizabeth Jennings Won the Right to Ride in New York. HarperCollins/Greenwillow Books. ISBN 978-0-06-267360-2.
- Hearth, Amy Hill (2023). Silent Came the Monster: A Novel of the 1916 Jersey Shore Shark Attacks. Blackstone Publishing. ISBN 979-8-200-74915-7.
- Pelosi, Nancy; Hearth, Amy Hill (2008). Know Your Power: A Message to America's Daughters. New York: Doubleday. ISBN 978-0-7679-2944-8.
