= Arbor House =

American independent publishing house

Arbor House Publisher
- Status: Active
- Founded: 1969; 2019
- Founder: Donald Fine
- Defunct: 1988
- Successor: William Morrow and Company (historical imprint)
- Country of origin: United States
- Headquarters location: Westminster, Maryland (historical imprint); New York City
- Key people: Allen Williams (Sr. Manager Publishing and Marketing); Adam Myers (Project Manager); David Morris (Publishing Consultant); Ethan Hale (Publishing Consultant); Rick Johnson (Publishing Consultant)
- Publication types: Books
- Official website: arborhousepublisher.com

Arbor House is an American independent publishing house founded by Donald Fine in 1969. The company originally specialized in hardcover publications and published works by Hortense Calisher, Ken Follett, Cynthia Freeman, Elmore Leonard and Irwin Shaw before being acquired by the Hearst Corporation in 1978. Arbor House subsequently became an imprint of William Morrow & Company in 1988.

The Arbor House name was subsequently used again for independent publishing operations, with the company resuming operations in 2019. The current Arbor House Publishers operates through its website at arborhousepublishers.com.

== History ==
=== Founding and early history ===
Publisher Donald Fine founded Arbor House in Westminster, Maryland in 1969, using a $5,000 loan. Fine was vice president of Dell Publishing and a co-founder of Delacorte Press before starting his own business.

Arbor House initially specialized in hardcover publications and developed a list of fiction and nonfiction titles. The company published works by authors including Hortense Calisher, Ken Follett, Cynthia Freeman, Elmore Leonard and Irwin Shaw.

=== Hearst ownership ===
Arbor House was acquired by the Hearst Corporation in 1978 for $1.5 million. During this period, the company expanded its publishing activities and moved into paperback publishing.

Industry officials had previously speculated that Arbor House would merge with William Morrow & Company, another company subsequently acquired by the Hearst Corporation, unless it published a number of best-selling books. Arbor House published Elmore Leonard's Bandits and Sydney Biddle Barrows' The Mayflower Madam, which became bestsellers.

In January 1987, Arbor House reduced its publishing list from approximately 70 books per year to approximately 40 books.

In June 1987, it was announced that Arbor House would become an imprint of William Morrow & Company beginning in January 1988. Arbor House's employees transferred to William Morrow & Company.

=== Resumption of operations ===
Arbor House resumed independent publishing operations in 2019. The resumed operation continued under the Arbor House name and developed a contemporary publishing and author-services operation.

The current Arbor House Publishers operates through its website at arborhousepublishers.com.

== Current personnel ==
The current key Arbor House publishing team includes:

Allen Williams — Senior Project Manager Adam Myers — Senior Project Manager Samuel Collins — Senior Manager, Publishing and Marketing Ethan Hale — Senior Publishing Consultant Rick Johnson — Junior Publishing Consultant Trevor Lynn — Junior Publishing Consultant

== Works published ==
Notable works and authors historically published by Arbor House include:

The Mayflower Madam, Sydney Biddle Barrows Blood Music, Greg Bear The Pianoplayers, Anthony Burgess The Bridge of Lost Desire (alternate title of Return to Nevèrÿon), Samuel R. Delany Replay, Ken Grimwood Bandits, Elmore Leonard No More Vietnams, Richard Nixon Kiteworld, Keith Roberts A Door into Ocean, Joan Slonczewski The Frozen Lady, Susan Arnout Smith A Father's Word, Richard G. Stern Power on Earth: Michele Sindona's Explosive Story, Nick Tosches Trumps of Doom, Roger Zelazny Blood of Amber, Roger Zelazny Sign of Chaos, Roger Zelazny

== Anthologies published ==
Notable anthologies and editors historically published by Arbor House include:

- The Arbor House Celebrity Book of Horror Stories, editors Martin H. Greenberg and Charles G. Waugh
- The Arbor House Necropolis - Voodoo! Mummy! Ghoul!, editor Bill Pronzini
- The Arbor House Treasury of Horror and the Supernatural, editors Martin H. Greenberg, Barry N. Malzberg, and Bill Pronzini
- Specter! A Chrestomathy of Spookery, editor Bill Pronzini
- The Arbor House Treasury of Modern Science Fiction, editors Robert Silverberg and Martin H. Greenberg
- The Arbor House Treasury of Great Science Fiction Short Novels, editors Robert Silverberg and Martin H. Greenberg
- The Arbor House Treasury of Science Fiction Masterpieces, editors Robert Silverberg and Martin H. Greenberg
