= Return to Nevèrÿon =

1987 story collection by Samuel R. Delany

- Dust-jacket from the 1987 Arbor House first edition.
- Author: Samuel R. Delany
- Original title: The Bridge of Lost Desire
- Cover artist: Ned Dameron
- Language: English
- Series: Return to Nevèrÿon
- Genre: Sword and Sorcery
- Publisher: Arbor House
- Publication date: 1987
- Publication place: United States
- Media type: Print (hardback & paperback)
- ISBN: 0-87795-931-5
- OCLC: 15591618
- Dewey Decimal: 813/.54 19
- LC Class: PS3554.E437 B75 1987
- Preceded by: Flight from Nevèrÿon

Return to Nevèrÿon is a collection of three sword and sorcery stories by American writer Samuel R. Delany: "The Game of Time and Pain", "The Tale of Rumor and Desire", and "The Tale of Gorgik", and "Appendix: Closures and Openings". It is the last of the four-volume Return to Nevèrÿon series. The collection was first published under the title The Bridge of Lost Desire.

== Contents ==
Cover of the 1988 St. Martin's Press first paperback edition with cover art by Blas Gallego.

=== 1987 edition as The Bridge of Lost Desire (Arbor House) ===
- "The Game of Time and Pain"
- "The Tale of Rumor and Desire"
- "The Tale of Gorgik"
- “Return...” A Preface by K. Leslie Steiner (Delany)

=== 1988 edition as The Bridge of Lost Desire (St. Martin's Press) ===
The first paperback edition was identical in content to the 1988 edition, but with cover art by fantasy and comics artist Blas Gallego in the style of previous first editions of the series. The cover was the first in the series to represent the main character as dark-skinned; previous covers in the series had substituted white characters for the people of color described in the books.

=== 1989 edition as Return to Nevèrÿon (Grafton) ===
- "The Game of Time and Pain"
- "The Tale of Rumor and Desire"
- "The Tale of Gorgik"
- "Closures and Openings"
- "Buffon’s Needle" by Robert Wentworth & Samuel R. Delany

=== 1994 edition as Return to Nevèrÿon (Wesleyan University Press) ===
Identical to the 1989 edition, but omits "Buffon's Needle".

== "The Game of Time and Pain" ==
In the tenth and chronologically final tale in the series, “The Game of Time and Pain” (1985), Gorgik has been successful in his political campaign to end slavery officially throughout the land of Nevèrÿon. The political question is how the nation should deal intelligently with this sudden population of freed slaves. This Gorgik narrates to one of his young sexual partners, a barbarian boy named Udrog, when the two find themselves together in an abandoned castle for the night, just before the passing of a funeral procession of one of Gorgik's major political adversaries. Other than the first tale, this is the only one in which Gorgik is on stage for the majority of the action.

== "The Tale of Rumor and Desire" ==
The last of the tales, “The Tale of Rumor and Desire” (1987) goes back in time to gives portrait of a character called Clodon, whom we have seen before (in “The Tale of Fog and Granite”), but who has been fairly minor till now. During the outlaw days of Gorgik the Liberator, when his rebellion was at its most violent, while Gorgik was a hero to many, he was a villain to many others. In an age and a nation where there is no media, numerous people have taken to pretending they are Gorgik the Liberator, some for good and some for evil, for their own ends. In “Fog and Granite” Clodon does exactly this. “Rumor and Desire” shows a set of mosaic pieces from Clodon's life before he decided to take on the Liberator's identity in order to be a more effective highway bandit. As Delany writes in the voice of "K. Leslie Steiner", in the introduction to the entire project (“Return... a preface”, in Tales of Nevèrÿon), the eleventh and final written story, “The Tale of Rumor and Desire”:

... was one Delany wrote when a two-volume collection of all the shorter Nevèrÿon stories and novellas had been planned. That last written story was crafted to make a transition between “The Tale of Dragons and Dreamers” and “The Tale of Fog and Granite” for readers who would not be able to take the journey through the full-length novel, Neveryóna, or: The Tale of Signs and Cities, which, while it naturally falls out as tale number six, was too long to be included in that bipartite omnibus.

== "The Tale of Gorgik" ==
While the events of “Rumor and Desire” take place during, or just after, the events of Neveryóna (whose main character is a fifteen-year-old girl, Pryn, who runs away from her village to start traveling around Nevèrÿon, and who, for the first third of the novel, falls in with Gorgik's revolutionary activities when its efforts are centered in Kolhari itself), it has always been published at the end, before a recapitulation of the very first story, "The Tale of Gorgik".
