= St. Luke's Episcopal Church (Katonah, New York) =

Historic church in New York, United States

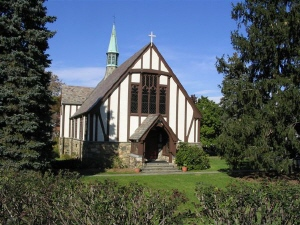
- East elevation, 2005

Religion
- Affiliation: Episcopal Church in the United States of America
- Leadership: The Rev. Dr. Kris Lewis-Theerman
- Year consecrated: 1923

Location
- Location: Katonah, NY, USA
- Interactive map of St. Luke's Episcopal Church
- Coordinates: 41°15′9″N 73°41′2″W

Architecture
- Architect: Hobart Upjohn
- Style: Tudor Revival
- Groundbreaking: 1921
- Completed: 1923

Specifications
- Direction of façade: east
- Materials: Stone, stucco, wood

U.S. National Register of Historic Places
- Added to NRHP: January 4, 2001
- NRHP Reference no.: 00001612

Website
- St. Luke's Episcopal Church, Katonah, New York

St. Luke's Episcopal Church is a historic Episcopal church located on Bedford Road in Katonah, New York, United States. It is a Tudor Revival structure dating to the early 1920s, housing a congregation restarted in the early 20th century.

The church building was designed by Hobart Upjohn, third in the family of American architects by that name. The original parish house, moved from its location along with most of Katonah in the late 19th century, has been demolished, but the church itself remains intact. In 2001 it was added to the National Register of Historic Places.

== Building ==
The church is located on a small triangular lot between Bedford Road and Katonah Avenue at the southern end of the village's downtown. It is just outside the Katonah Village Historic District. Next to the church is its parish house, not included in the Register listing.

Mature trees shade the building on the south and west, centered around a large spruce tree at the road junction that serves as Katonah's community Christmas tree each year. The building itself is a one-story structure on a stone foundation that rises to the roofline of a small gabled portico over the main entrance on the east (front) elevation. Above that it is faced in painted stucco with the exposed vertical half-timbers of the Tudor Revival architectural style. The steeply pitched gabled roof is shingled in slate. A copper steeple rises from the intersection of the nave and chancel.

A large three-part window is located above the main entrance. It is filled with original stained glass and Gothic tracery. Another stained glass window is located in the northwest corner of the nave.

Inside the church, exposed timber arches rise from the floor on the side aisles to the ceiling's exposed wooden decking. The white plaster walls have a continuous dark wooden dado at the window sill level. The simple stained wooden pews are arranged in rows with center and side aisles. A storage area is located in the loft above the sacristy, and the partial basement holds the boiler and other utility-related equipment.

== History ==
Episcopalians in Katonah were organized in 1855 as St. Mark's, under the pastoral care of St. Matthew's Church in nearby Bedford. After 1887, that congregation was disbanded. The following year John Jay II, grandson of the first Chief Justice of the United States, left $500 in his will to start another Episcopal parish.

Efforts to do so were disrupted in 1895 when the village moved from its original site to make way for the construction of Muscoot Reservoir. The congregation was finally renewed in 1916, meeting in a movie theater and later a warehouse. Five years later the members asked St. Mark's of Mount Kisco to adopt them as a mission, and raised the money to buy the land and commission a design from Upjohn.

Upjohn, the son of Richard M. Upjohn and grandson of Richard Upjohn, both designers of well-known churches in their careers, produced an exemplary Tudor Revival church. It is atypical of most of his other work, except for the English Gothic-style Mead Memorial Chapel in nearby Waccabuc. The exposed timber arches on the interior complement the half-timbers on the outside, and minimal decoration augments the heavy wood.

The cornerstone was laid in October 1921. Roughly two years later, the first services were held. It was formally dedicated shortly before Christmas 1923.

The church remained under the care of St. Mark's until 1944, when it became an organized mission of the Episcopal Diocese of New York. Fourteen years later, in 1958, it became self-supporting. The next year it bought the current parish house, two doors down Katonah Avenue, from a neighbor, and then demolished the former Parish House, which had been brought to the current village from the former site, in 1961. There have been no alterations to the church property since.

== The church today ==
The church holds regular Sunday services and major holy days, as well as providing Christian education for children and adults. The choir is led by noted choral conductor Harold Rosenbaum. On Mother's Day weekend each year, the church holds a plant sale to raise money, 10% of which is donated to outreach

== See also ==
- National Register of Historic Places listings in northern Westchester County, New York
