= The Children Star =

1998 novel by Joan Slonczewski

- Author: Joan Slonczewski
- Publisher: Tor Books
- Publication date: 1998
- ISBN: 0-312-86716-6

The Children Star is a 1998 science fiction novel by Joan Slonczewski, published by Tor Books. It is the third book in her Elysium Cycle. The novel references elements from the world of Slonczewski’s A Door into Ocean (which is the first book in the Elysium Cycle and which won the 1987 John W. Campbell Memorial Award for Best Science Fiction Novel).

== Plot ==
The futuristic novel is set mostly upon Prokaryon (“The Children Star”), a world with highly different biological foundations than ours.

In the beginning of the novel, the orphaned toddler ’jum G’hana (‘pig urine’) is rescued from pandemic-ravaged Reyo on the world L'li by Brother Rod, who takes her first to a satellite, the Fold Council Station for Xenobiotic Research and Engineering. The central question of the novel is whether or not Prokaryon will be terraformed, as Valedon has previously been. Terraforming and mining for rare-earth elements with lanthanide extractors is illegal in the Fold, unless scientists have established the existence on a planet of no intelligent life forms that can lay prior claim.

On the satellite, ’jum is cared for by Reverend Mother Artemis, an electronic being who has won her freedom as a “sentient”–– she has a screen for a face, nanoplastic hands, multiple breasts, and skirts which display holographic bears, lions, and flying fish from the Elysian ocean. On the station, Mother Artemis discovers that ’jum is a prodigy at mathematics and geometry.

The group move to their Spirit Caller colony on Prokaryon, a world with triple-stranded DNA and a thin ozone layer, and colonists share rumors of “hidden masters”, unknown beings which direct the vegetation and animals to behave in odd ways. Indigenous life on the planet consists of zoöids, wheelgrass, helicoids (which fly in flocks), hoopsnakes, ring fungus, singing trees, tumblerounds (tire-shaped tumbleweeds), etc. The colony, which raises orphans, supports itself partly through mining for corundum and gem-quality stones in a nearby gravel pit.

Sarai, who is a Sharer from Valedon, is conducting research on Prokaryon. She heals children of the colony, and requests help –– in specific, the child ’jum, who she has taken a liking to, and whose analytical skills she finds useful. Together Sarai and ’jum study microzoöids. Their work is threatened by Proteus Unlimited, a company which the Fold has entrusted to manage Sarai’s research facility. Sarai threatens Proteus Unlimited’s “male-freakish” representatives.

In the second half of the novel, Sarai and ’jum learn to interpret the light-emissions of the microzoöids, and they prove themselves to be an intelligent life form on Prokaryon. At the same time, however, preparations are being made to terraform Prokaryon. While debate in preparation for the terraforming takes place, the microzöids reveal themselves to be the hidden masters of Prokaryon, and they also reveal they have decided to destroy humanity, because “Intelligent worlds are too dangerous. Not worth the risk.” However, say the microzoöids, “The few left will be bred as animals.” In the end, a fragile truce is established between humans and micozoöids, who have generated so quickly, the younger generations have lost their taste for universal domination.

== Reception ==
The Children Star is discussed in Derek J. Theiss’s ”Bodies That Remember: Historical Revision and Embodied Age in Joan Slonczewski’s Children Star and Brain Plague” in Science Fiction Studies.

Kirkus Reviews said it was “Beautifully constructed and absorbingly related”, though the reviewer found the idea of sentient bacteria less believable.

In a review for SF Site, Greg L. Johnson said “The Children Star is a well-written novel that is a worthwhile addition to the future history Slonczewski began in A Door into Ocean and Daughter of Elysium.” Johnson, however, takes issue with what he calls a stereotypical drawing of the villain in the novel, Nibur Letheshon, the director of Proteus Unlimited.
