= Cynthia Freeman =

American romance novelist (1915–1988)

Beatrice Cynthia Freeman (c. 1915 – October 22, 1988), later Beatrice Feinberg, best-known under the pen name Cynthia Freeman, was an American romance novelist. She was known for multigenerational romances centered on Jewish family life and the drama of immigration and cultural assimilation.

== Early life and marriage ==
Freeman was born in New York City around 1915 to Albert C. and Sylvia Jeannette (Hack) Freeman and shortly after her birth moved to San Francisco, California. She was Jewish. She dropped out of public school out of boredom in middle school and was then privately tutored by her mother and others, and she began auditing classes at the University of California, Berkeley at the age of fifteen.

Freeman married Herman Feinberg in 1933 at the age of eighteen, becoming Beatrice Feinberg, and had two children, Sheldon and Arlene.

== Career ==
During her marriage, Freeman decided to pursue professional life outside the home and started an interior decoration business in the late 1940s which she then ran for 25 years. When poor health and five years of off-and-on hospitalization forced her to give up her business, she began to write novels; her first, A World Full of Strangers, was published in 1975 by Arbor House under the pseudonym Cynthia Freeman. Readers purchased over 20,000 hard-cover copies and over two million paperback copies, making the book a commercial success, and she went on to write nine novels over thirteen years.

Freeman specialized in romantic multi-generational stories of Jewish families, centering on a female protagonist, especially dealing with issues of immigration and assimilation. These often reviewed poorly, for instance as "Jewish soap opera," but they sold well: their sales totaled over twenty million copies during her life. Her 1981 novel No Time For Tears, "a dauntless woman leads her family from Czarist Russia to Palestine to New York's diamond center," was No.10 on the list of bestselling novels in the United States for 1981 as determined by The New York Times. Her books were translated into thirty-three languages.

== End of life ==
Freeman's husband died in May 1986 and her daughter died in a car accident in 1985.

She died of cancer in San Francisco on October 22, 1988, aged 73.

== Bibliography ==
- A World Full of Strangers (1975)
- Fairytales (1977)
- The Days of Winter (1978)
- Portraits (1979)
- Come Pour the Wine (1980)
- No Time For Tears (1981)
- Illusions of Love (1984)
- Seasons of the Heart (1986)
- The Last Princess (1988)
- Always and Forever (1990)
