= Katonah, New York =

CDP in the town of Bedford, Westchester County, in the U.S. state of New York

- CDP
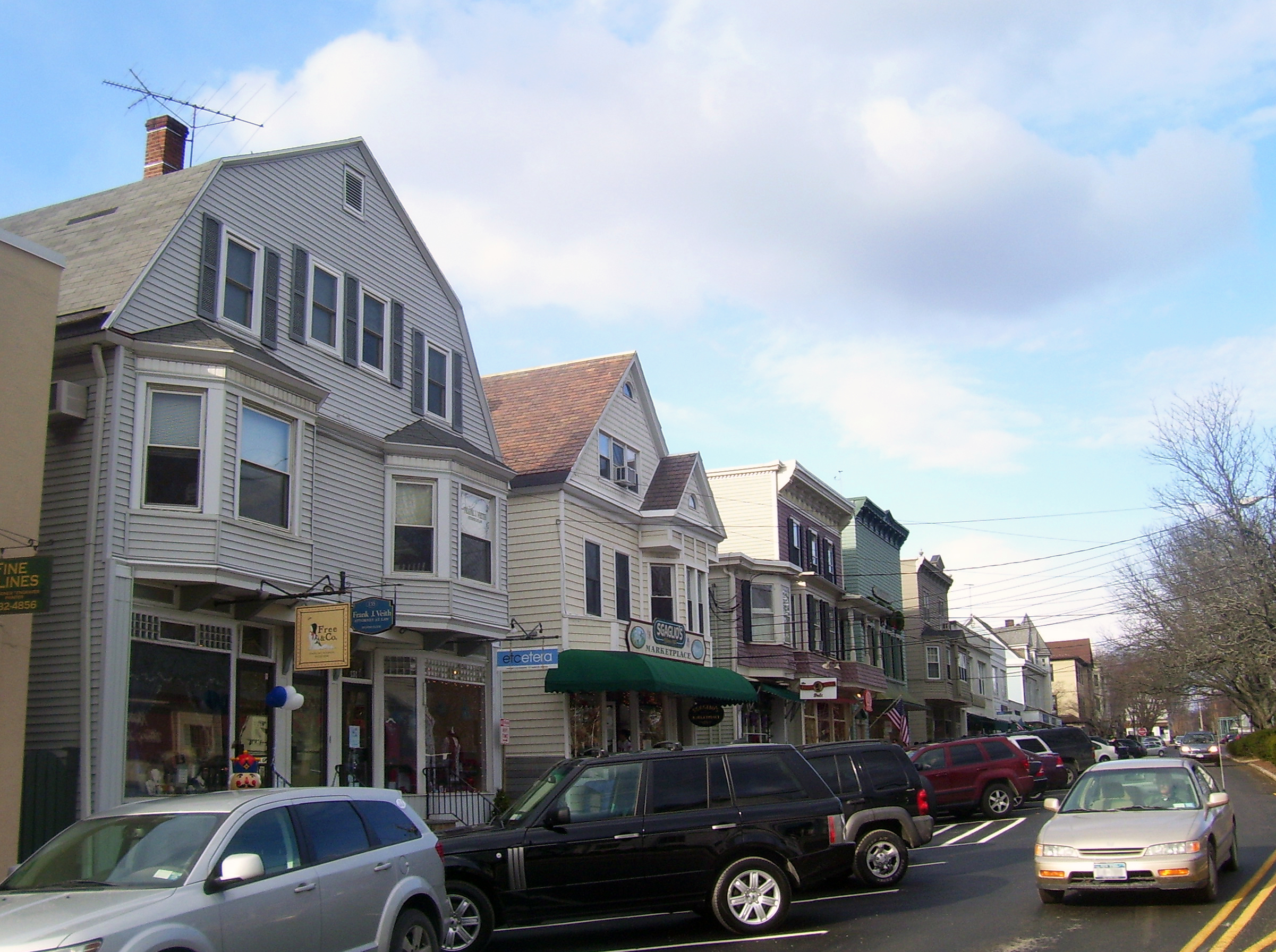
- Looking north along Katonah Avenue

- Location within the state of New York
- Coordinates: 41°15′31″N 73°41′7″W
- Country: United States
- State: New York
- County: Westchester
- Town: Bedford
- Established: 1897

Area
  - Total: 0.81 sq mi (2.11 km^{2})
  - Land: 0.73 sq mi (1.90 km^{2})
  - Water: 0.077 sq mi (0.20 km^{2})
- Elevation: 235 ft (72 m)

Population (2020)
  - Total: 1,603
  - Density: 2,183.3/sq mi (842.98/km^{2})
- Time zone: UTC-5 (Eastern (EST))
  - Summer (DST): UTC-4 (EDT)
- ZIP code: 10536
- Area code: 914
- FIPS code: 36-38946
- GNIS feature ID: 0954396

Katonah /kəˈtoʊnə/ is a hamlet and census-designated place (CDP) within the town of Bedford, Westchester County, in the U.S. state of New York. The Katonah CDP had a population of 1,603 at the 2020 census.

== History ==
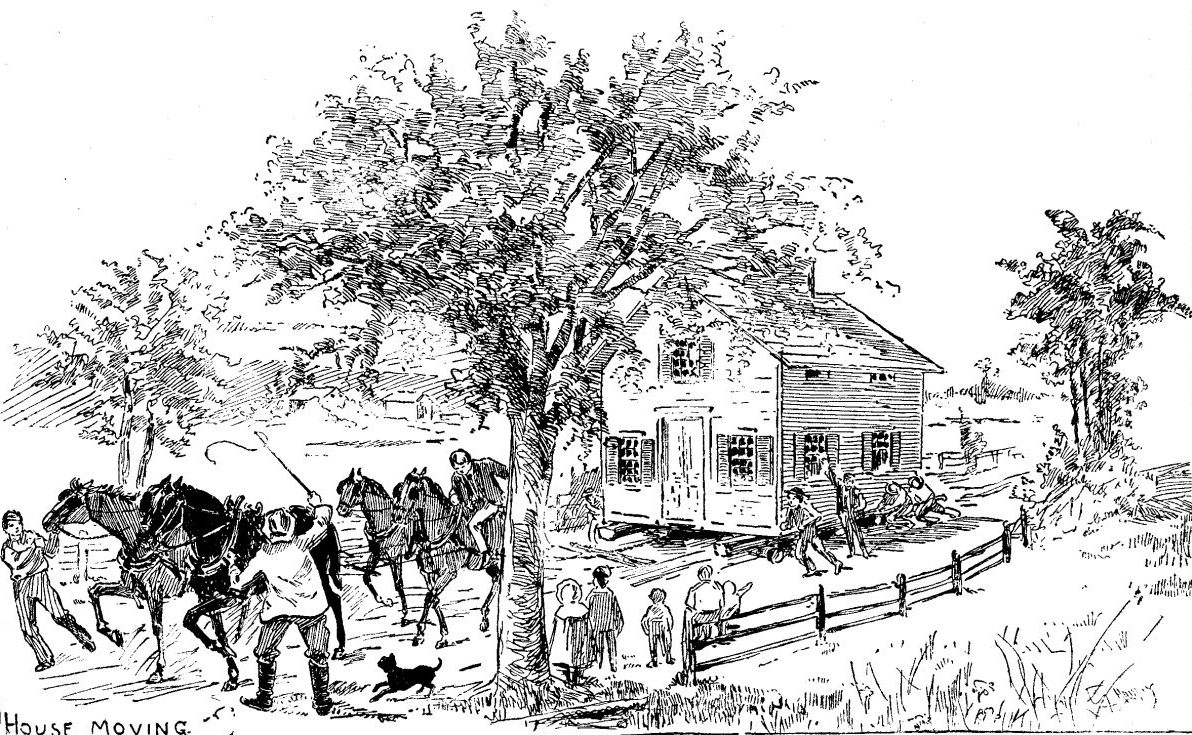
Moving from Old Katonah to New

Katonah is named for Chief Katonah, a Native American sachem from whom the land of Bedford was purchased by a group of English colonists.

During the American Revolution, most local men supported the Continental side, with some joining the New York 4th Regiment of the Line and the majority the local Militia. Though Bedford Township lay in what was called the Neutral Ground, its inhabitants were preyed on by military units and irregulars affiliated with both sides of the war. The Katonah area suffered less from such depredations than other areas in the Neutral Ground because of the proximity of the Croton River and the "Westchester Lines", a sparse string of outposts defended by units of the Continental Army.

Originally known as Whitlockville, the settlement changed its name, then moved south to its present site in 1897, when what is known by some as "Old Katonah" was flooded by the construction of the New Croton Dam. This raised the water level behind it enough to submerge the existing Muscoot Dam, the waters it empounded, and the village, under the resultantly expanded Muscoot Reservoir. More than 50 buildings were moved from the old site to "New Katonah", rolled on logs pulled by horses. The move was originally ordered to start in 1894, but litigation delayed this by almost three years. Evidently not all of the moved houses were within the affected area, leaving empty foundations where new houses would eventually be built upon.

An eleven-year-old child named B. Robertson wrote the following to a children's magazine on March 2, 1897:

The people of Katonah do not want to have it thought that New York City has made them move because they are careless about their drainage. It is because the city is going to make a new reservoir where the old village of Katonah now stands. Katonah has three churches, a public library and reading-room, a village improvement association, and a graded school, and was proud of itself.

— 11-year-old B. Robertson, in a letter to a children's magazine

Katonah was just one of a great number of settlements in northern Westchester and Putnam counties to be eradicated - variously moved, demolished, or burnt to the ground - during the creation of the Croton Watershed as part of New York City's drinking water supply.

== Trademark attempt ==
In early 2007, groups representing the hamlet came out in opposition to a trademark filed by homemaking mogul Martha Stewart for a new furniture line called the "Katonah Collection". Stewart purchased a 152-acre (0.62 km^{2}) estate in Katonah in 2000, and it is there that she spent her five months of house arrest following her prison term resulting from charges of "lying to investigators". Representatives stated that Stewart was seeking to "honor the town" and the new furniture line was "...paying homage to this beautiful region". The pending trademark was contested by the Katonah Village Improvement Society and Katonah Architectural Hardware, along with support from the Ramapough Mountain Indians who foresaw legal conflict should Stewart succeed in trademarking the name for her furniture line. The parties reached a settlement in which the representatives of Katonah would not contest a trademark "for furniture, mirrors, pillows and chair cushions" and Stewart would not seek a trademark for any additional products.

== Demographics ==
Historical population
Census	Pop.	Note	%±
2020	1,603		—
U.S. Decennial Census

Katonah is classified as a hamlet, with no legal status as an administrative jurisdiction. The Katonah post office serves portions of the towns of Bedford, Lewisboro and Somers. Katonah was identified as a census-designated place (CDP) for the first time in 2010.

According to the 2010 United States Census, the CDP of Katonah had a total population of 1,679 people, compared to 10,739 residents of the Katonah ZIP code, 10536. In 2010, half (5,391, or 50.2%) of the Katonah ZIP code's population resided in the town of Bedford, 36.9% in Somers and 12.9% in Lewisboro.

Within the Katonah CDP, there were 589 households, and 445 families residing at the 2010 census. The population density was 2,398.6 inhabitants per square mile (926.1/km^{2}). There were 619 housing units at an average density of 884.3 units per square mile (341.4 units/km^{2}). The racial makeup of the CDP was 87.1% White, 2.5% African American, 0.2% Native American, 2.6% Asian, 5.4% some other race, and 2.2% from two or more races. Hispanic or Latino of any race were 11.9% of the population.

There were 589 households, out of which 46.5% had children under the age of 18 living with them, 59.4% were headed by married couples living together, 12.2% had a female householder with no husband present, and 24.4% were non-families. 17.5% of all households were made up of individuals, and 5.1% were someone living alone who was 65 years of age or older. The average household size was 2.83, and the average family size was 3.24.

In the CDP, the population was spread out, with 29.5% under the age of 18, 5.1% from 18 to 24, 24.1% from 25 to 44, 31.7% from 45 to 64, and 9.6% who were 65 years of age or older. The median age was 40.6 years. For every 100 females, there were 88.0 males. For every 100 females age 18 and over, there were 87.5 males.

For the period 2007–11, the estimated median annual income for a household in the CDP was $166,296, and the median income for a family was $146,923. Male full-time workers had a median income of $104,250 versus $94,674 for females. The per capita income for the CDP was $60,408. About 4.7% of families and 6.7% of the population were below the poverty line, including 12.0% of those under age 18 and none of those age 65 or over.

== Community ==
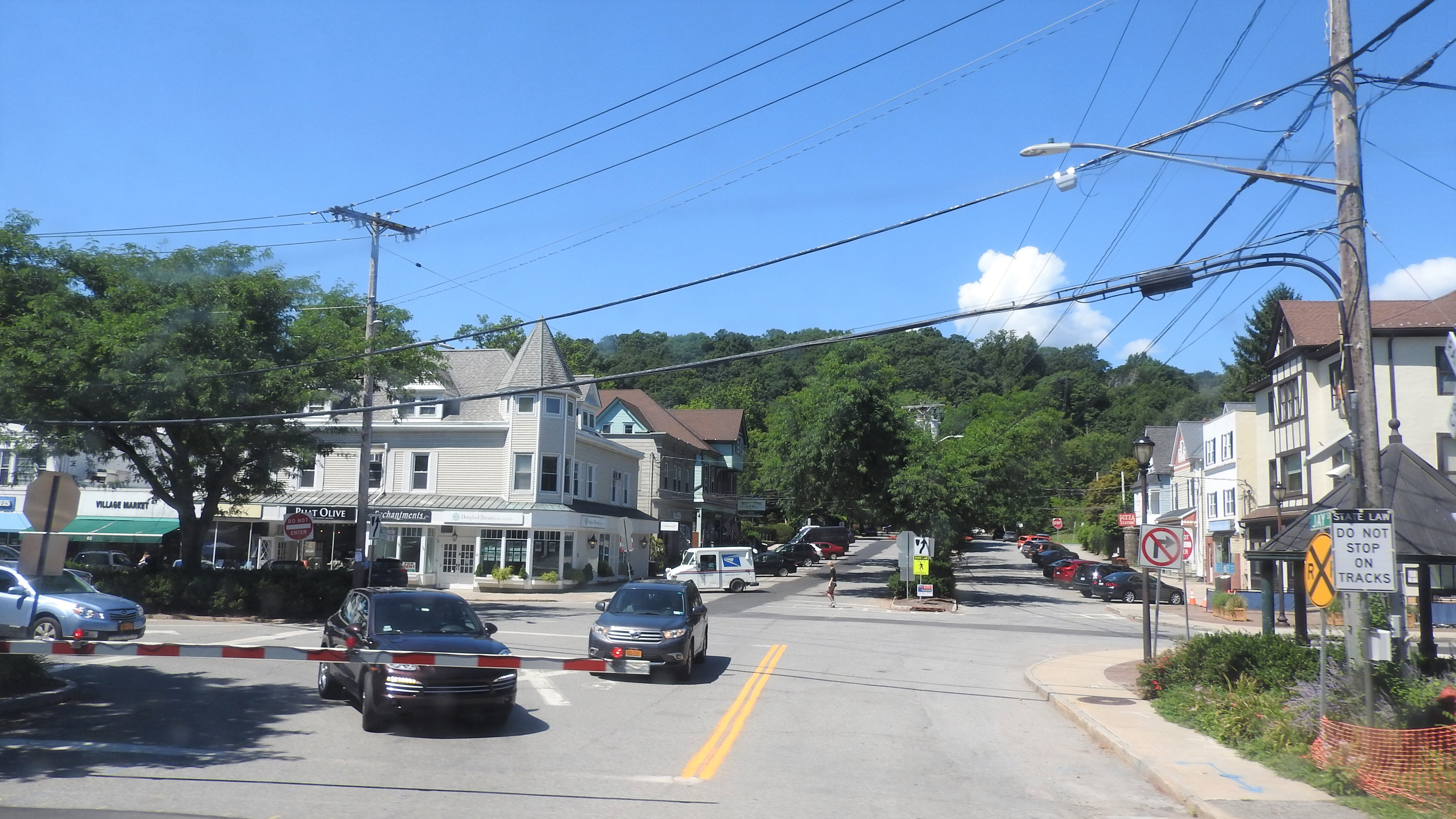
Jay Street, Katonah

The hamlet of Katonah includes two National Historic Landmarks: Stepping Stones - Historic Home of Bill & Lois Wilson, where the respective cofounders of Alcoholics Anonymous and Al-Anon Family Groups lived from 1941 until their deaths in 1971 and 1988, and the John Jay Homestead, the former home of John Jay, the first Chief Justice of the Supreme Court of the United States. Nearby is The Harvey School, a private day school founded in the 19th century which offers five-day boarding, and which counts among its alumni Doonesbury cartoonist Garry Trudeau. Bruce Willis, Ralph Lauren, and a number of other notables live in Katonah. Stanley Tucci, Blake Lively, and Ryan Reynolds live near Katonah as well.

By its residents, Katonah is often styled as a "village". The Katonah Village Improvement Society is a group that promotes community engagement, the arts, and business activity in the hamlet. The local library is called the Katonah Village Library and some other commercial functions and public works incorporate similar "village" terminology. Katonah generally has a concentration of population and businesses which may include portions of several towns. Katonah has its own Metro-North station. As a result of the hamlet's close proximity to New York City and its immediate connection to the aforementioned railroad station and the interstate, a sizable portion of the town consists of commuters. The area is part of the Katonah-Lewisboro school district.

From 1921 to 1937, Katonah was home to the Brookwood Labor College, the nation's first residential labor college.

The average house price in Katonah, as of 2006, was US$912,000.

== Notable sites ==
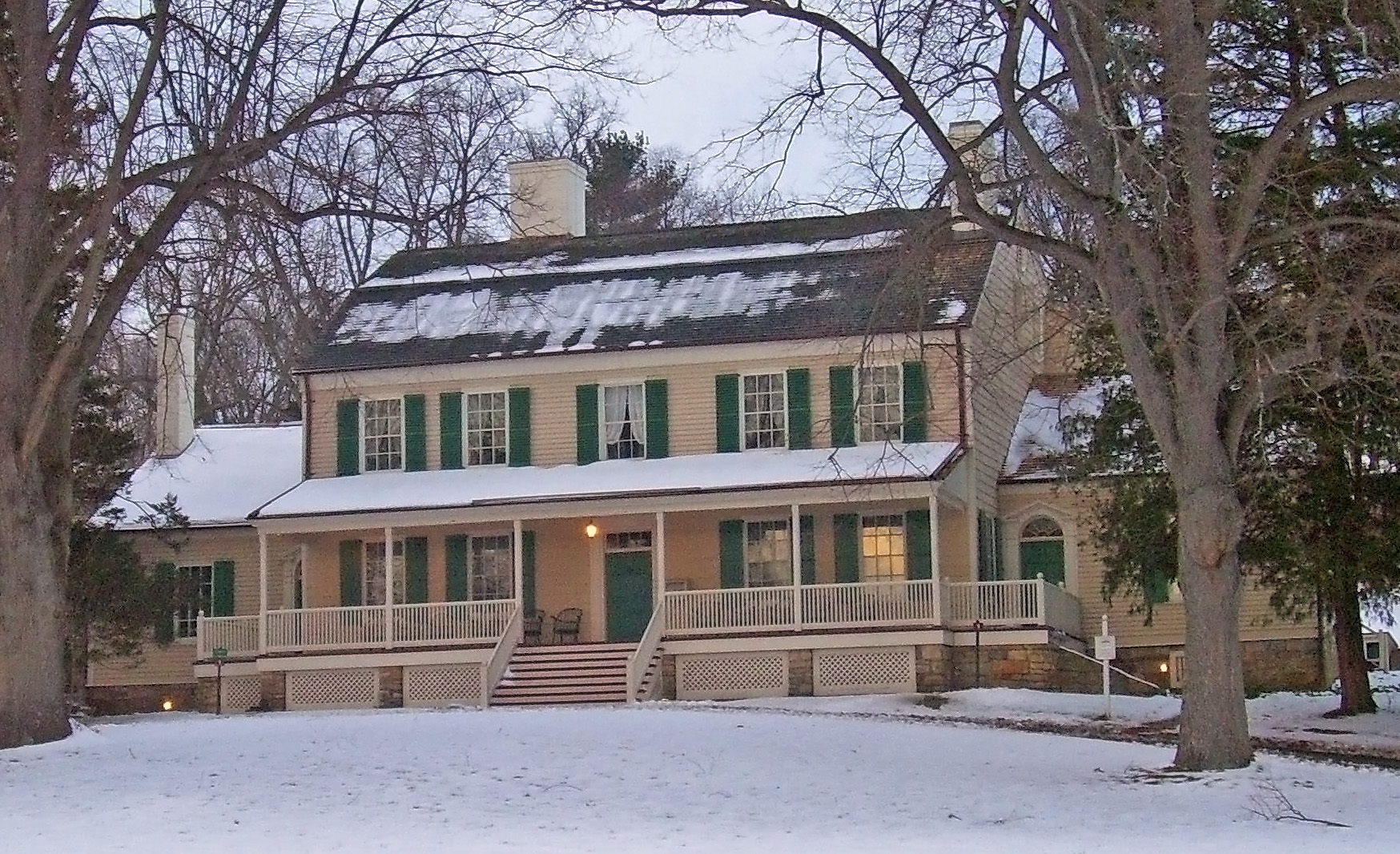
John Jay Homestead

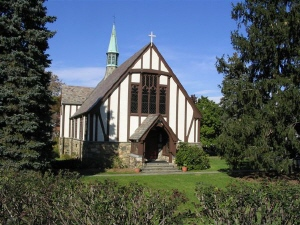
St. Luke's Episcopal Church

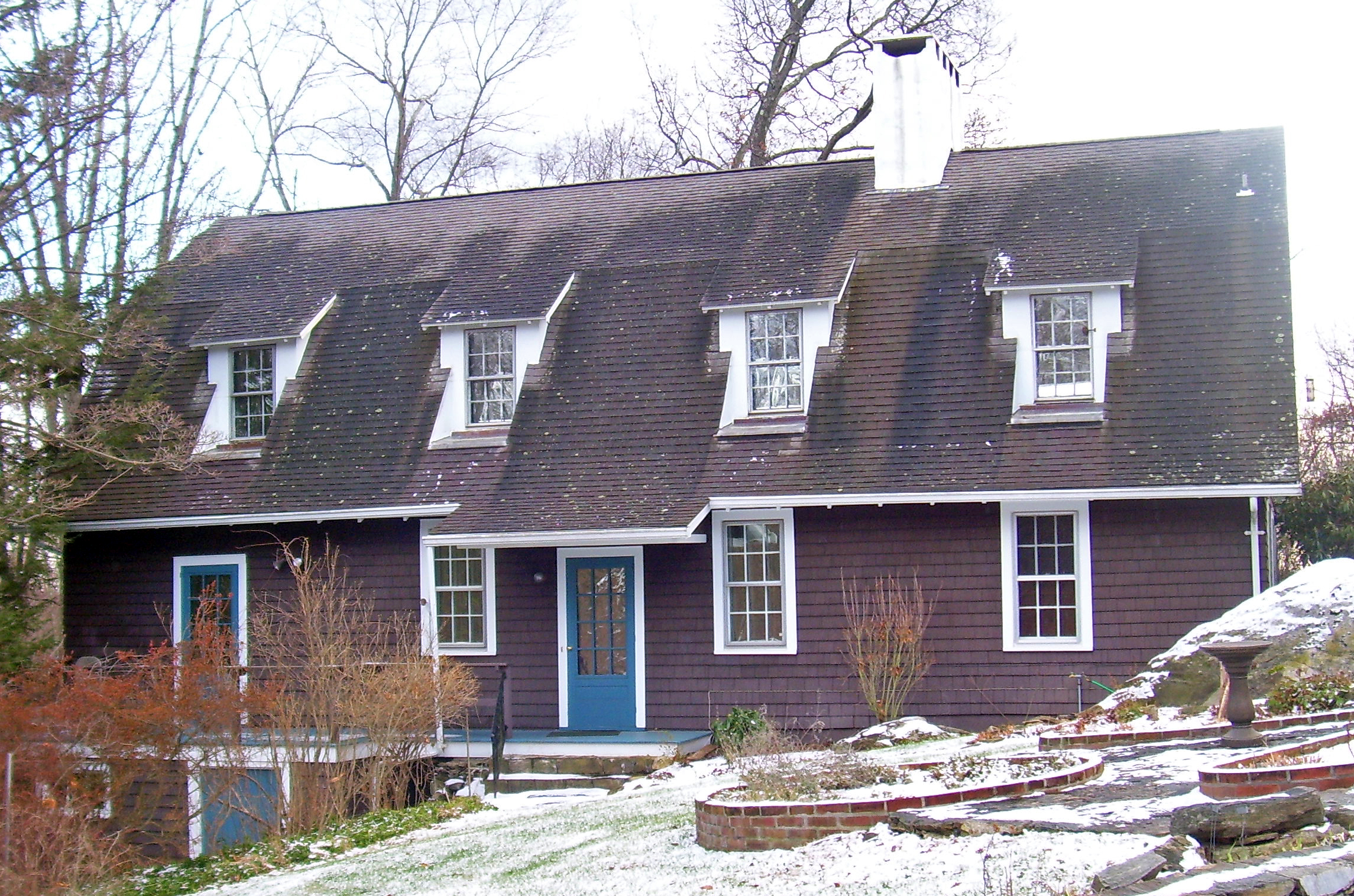
Stepping Stones

The Katonah Village Historic District, and St. Luke's Episcopal Church are listed on the National Register of Historic Places. The John Jay Homestead, the former home of US Supreme Court Chief Justice John Jay, is a New York State Historic Site and National Historic Landmark. Stepping Stones, home of Alcoholics Anonymous founders Bill and Lois Wilson, is also a National Historic Landmark.

The Katonah Museum of Art is a non-collecting institution presenting three to four visual arts exhibitions annually that examine a variety of disciplines, cultures, and historical periods. The Caramoor International Music Festival, which hosts the Orchestra of St. Luke's, is held annually at Caramoor, 2 miles (3 km) east of the hamlet. John Jay High School holds its annual commencement ceremony at Caramoor as well. The Katonah Poetry Series led by former US Poet Laureate Billy Collins holds readings at Katonah Village Library. Katonah Historical Museum opened in 1984 and is in the lower level of the library. Another attraction is Muscoot Farm. During the 1920s-1930s farming activity there was peaking, the farmland coming from the Hopkin's family has been taken care of by Westchester County thus far since 1967 due to high labor costs. The farm has many animals, camps, workshops for youth and adults, hayrides, opportunities for field trips, and even birthday events. Another attraction is the Katonah Art Center, which has two large painting studios, a children's studio, a pottery studio, a multi-arts studio, a darkroom, and a Mac computer lab. They also offer pottery, photography, painting and drawing classes, and summer camps.

Katonah was home to the Brookwood Labor College, the first labor college in the United States, providing adult education and training in social justice and activism. It was located on Cedar Road from 1919 until its closure in 1937.

== Schools and emergency services ==
Katonah is a part of the Katonah-Lewisboro School District. It contains Katonah Elementary School, although some students attend Increase Miller Elementary School in neighboring Goldens Bridge. Some students in Katonah also attended Lewisboro Elementary School until its closure in 2014, which was highly controversial. All middle and high school students in the Katonah-Lewisboro School District attend John Jay Middle School and John Jay High School. Katonah is also home to the private co-educational, college preparatory school The Harvey School, and formerly The Montfort Academy, a private, Roman Catholic high school that recently moved to Mount Vernon, New York.

The hamlet is served by the Katonah Volunteer Fire Department, which also hosts the annual Katonah carnival, parade, and "chili night". Emergency medical services are provided by the Katonah-Bedford Hills Volunteer Ambulance Corps. The Bedford police department provides police and traffic enforcement to the town of Bedford, including Katonah, Bedford Hills and Bedford Village.

== Local media ==
- The Record-Review, a weekly newspaper covering Katonah, Bedford, Bedford Hills, and Pound Ridge. The newspaper began publishing in 1995.
- The Lewisboro Ledger, which includes local news
- The Bedford-Katonah Patch, a blog and news website
- The Journal News (lohud), news coverage of both Westchester and Rockland County
- Katonah-Lewisboro Times, local newspaper by Halston Media

== Notable people ==
- George Randolph Barse Jr. (1861–1938), artist
- Bold, hardcore punk band
- Christian Camargo (born 1971), actor and director
- Michel Camilo (born 1954), pianist and composer
- Douglas Durst (born 1944), real estate developer
- Richard L. Feigen (1930–2021), gallery owner
- Noah Galvin (born 1994), actor
- Kyle Gordon (born 1992), musician, writer, comedian
- Andy Milonakis (born 1976), actor and comedian
- Mollie Parnis (1899–1992), fashion designer
- Sam Register (born 1969), President of Warner Brothers Animation and Cartoon Network Studios
- Mitchell Robinson (born 1998), center for the New York Knicks
- Joan Slonczewski (born 1956), microbiologist and science fiction writer
- George Soros (born 1930), investor
- Martha Stewart (born 1941), television personality
- Stanley Tucci (born 1960), actor
- William Griffith Wilson (aka Bill W. or Bill Wilson) (1895–1971), cofounder of Alcoholics Anonymous and writer
- Andrew Yang, (born 1975) entrepreneur, philanthropist, founder of Venture for America (VFA) and former candidate in the 2020 Democratic Party presidential primaries

== Gallery ==
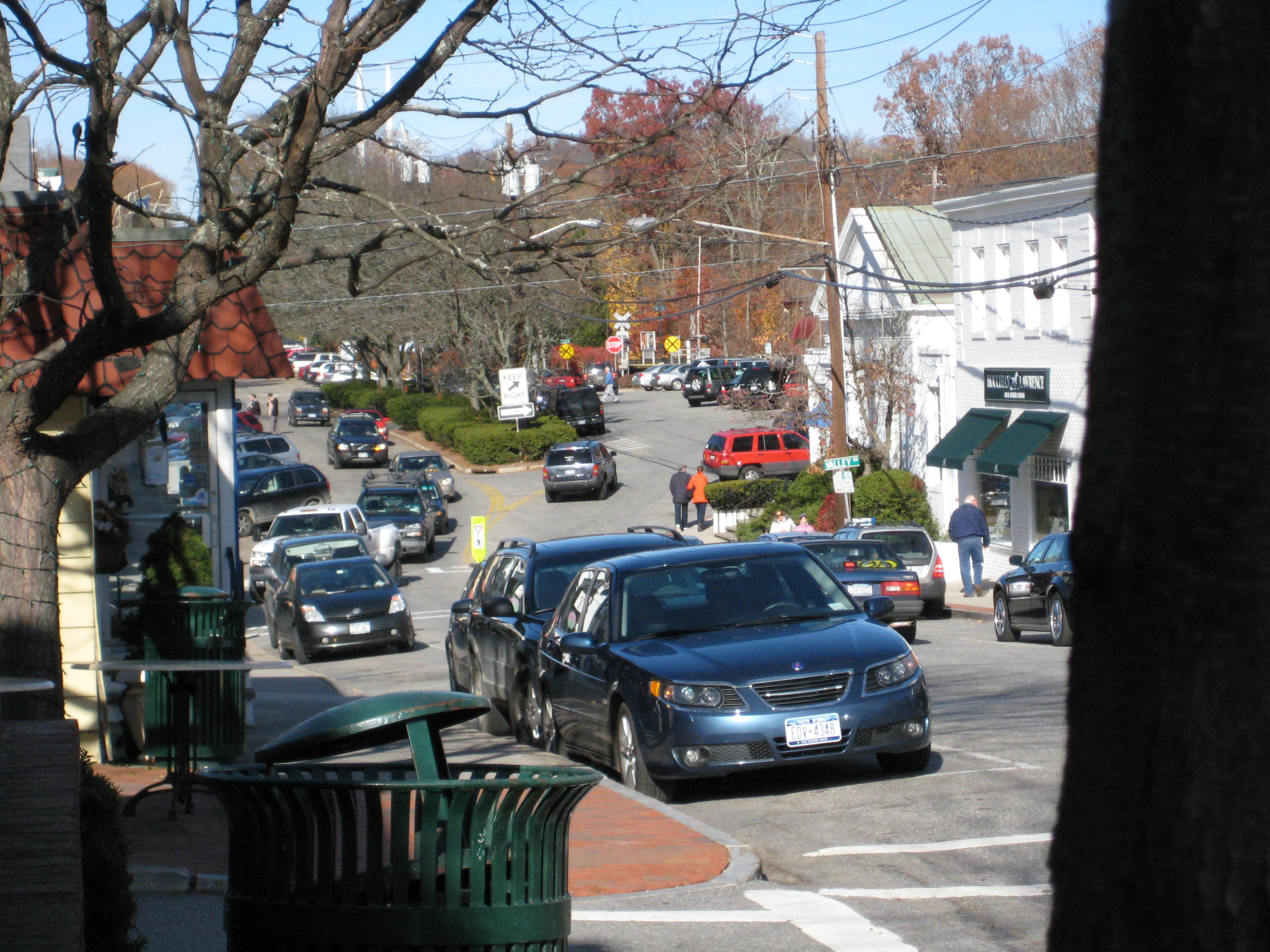
Downtown Katonah near The Blue Dolphin

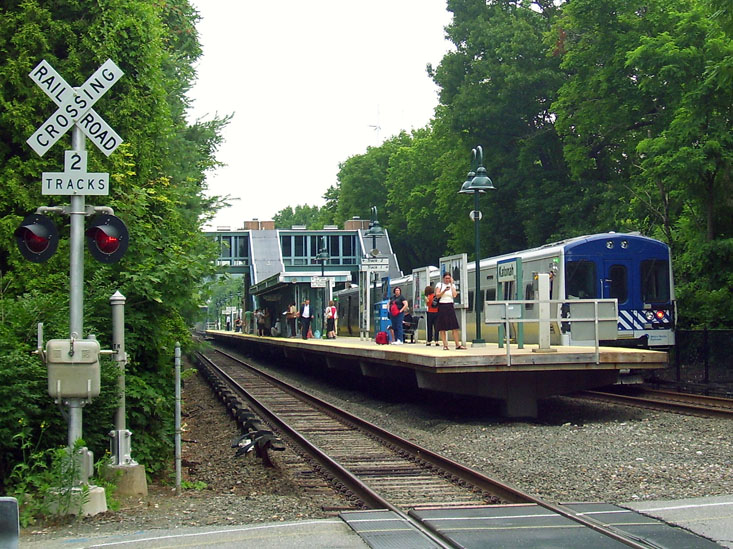
Katonah Metro-North station

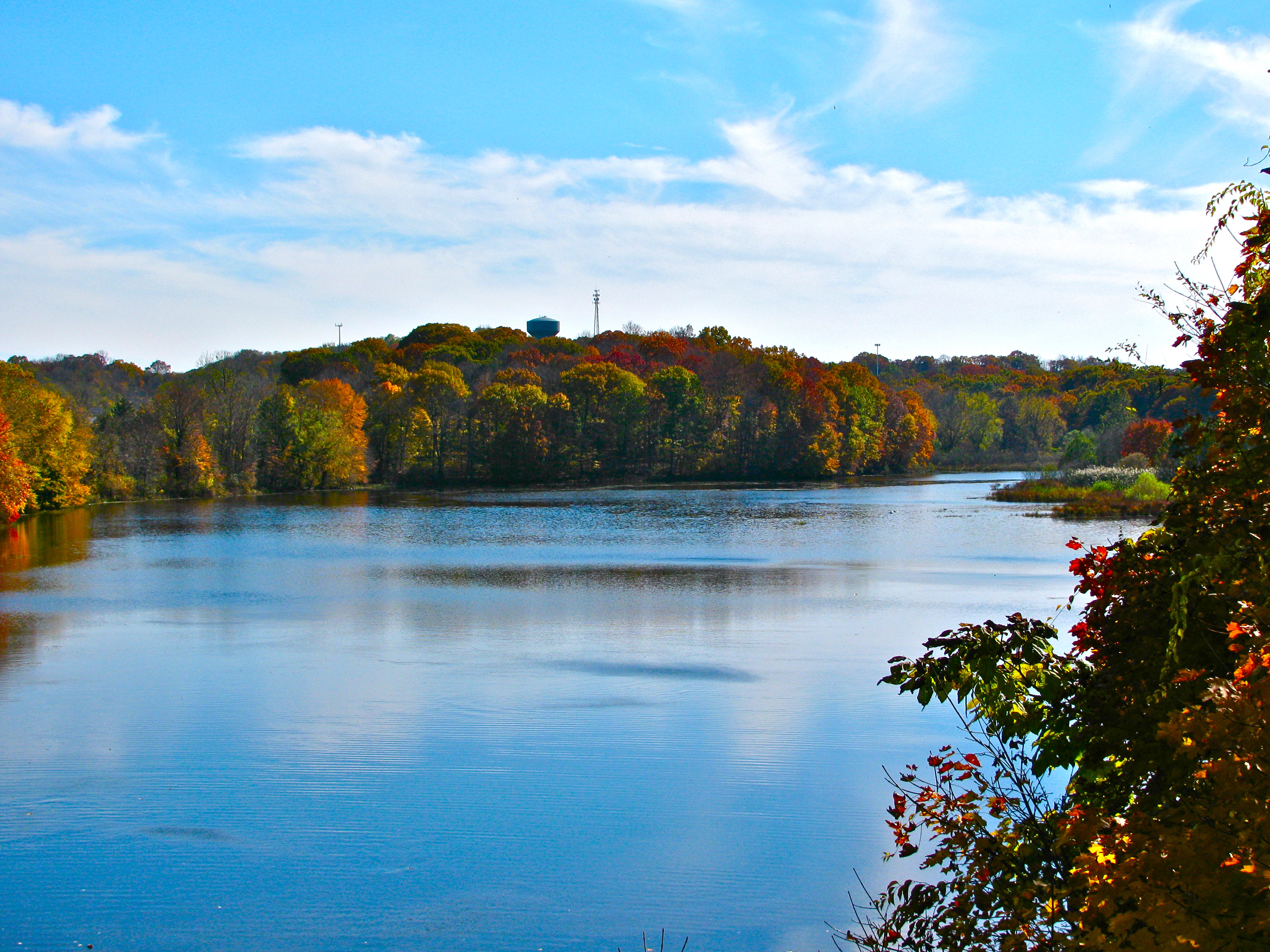
Muscoot Reservoir

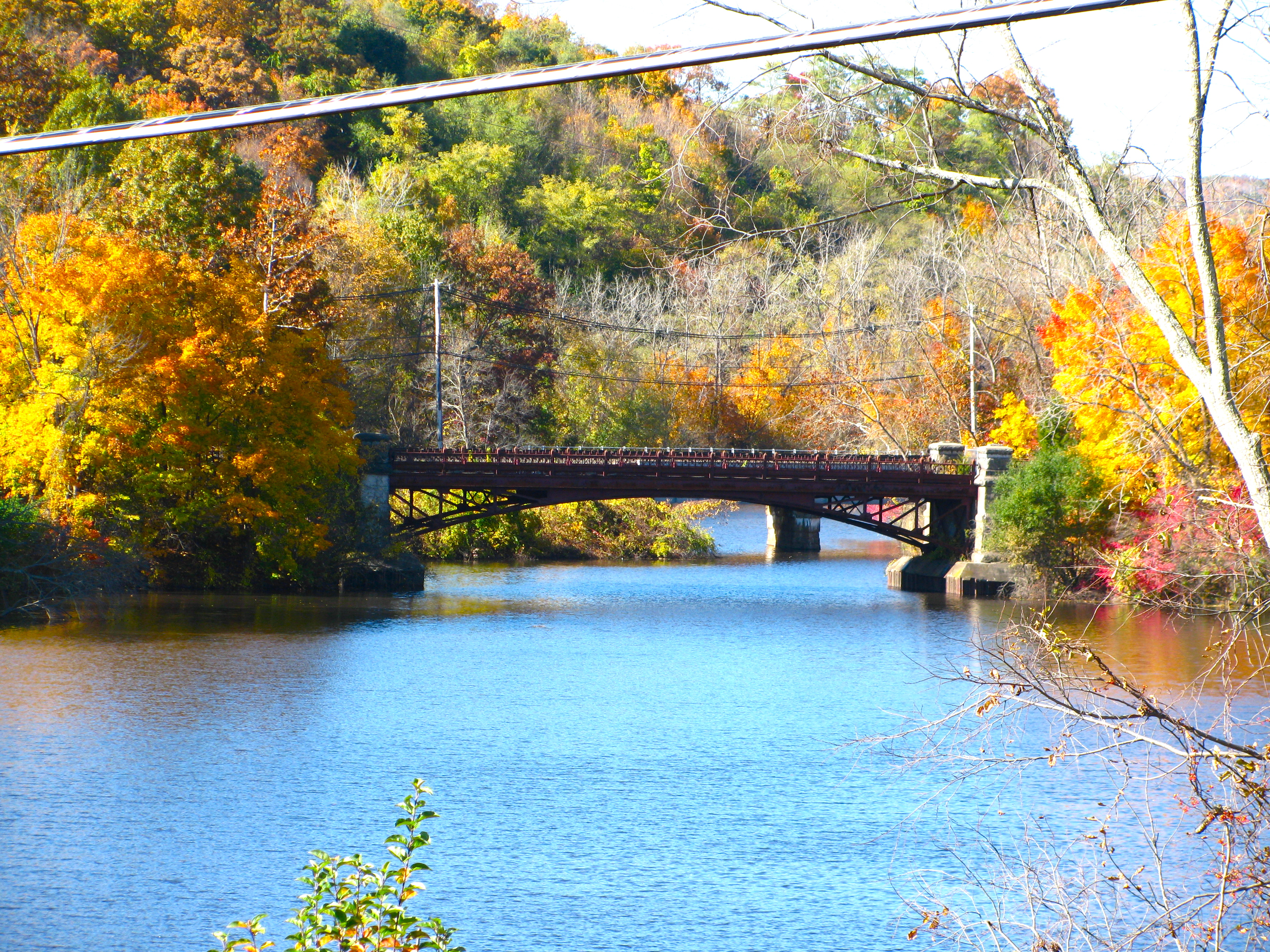
Bridge over Muscoot Reservoir

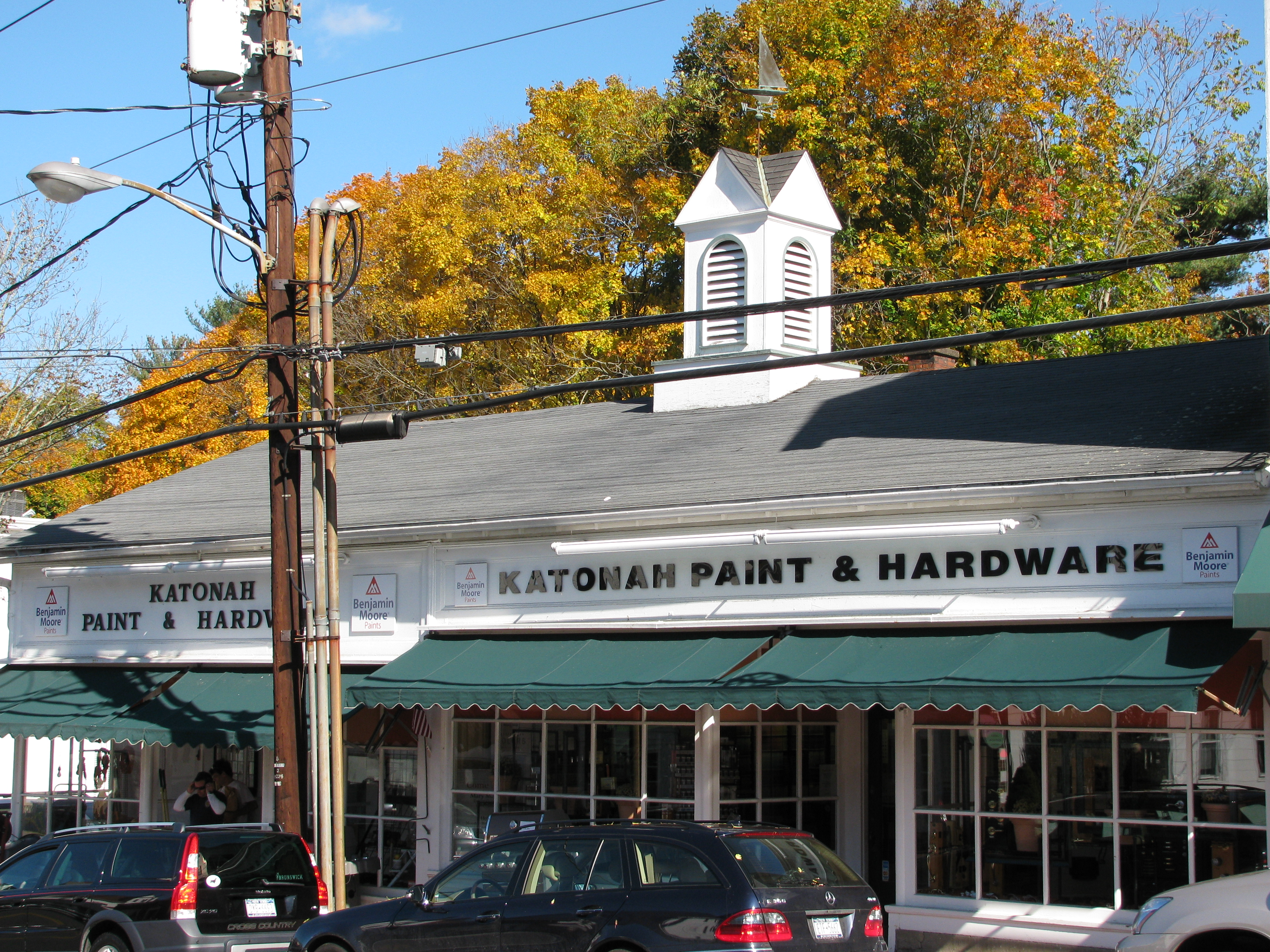
Katonah Hardware

== See also ==
- Brookwood Labor College
