= Return to Nevèrÿon (series) =

Book series by Samuel Delany

Return to Nevèrÿon book covers

Return to Nevèrÿon is a series of eleven sword and sorcery stories by Samuel R. Delany, originally published in four volumes during the years 1979–1987. Those volumes are:

- Tales of Nevèrÿon
- Neveryóna, or: The Tale of Signs and Cities
- Flight from Nevèrÿon
- Return to Nevèrÿon

The eleven tales are discussed in the articles devoted to the individual volumes mentioned above. The rest of this article is dedicated to the series as a whole.

== Overview ==
The eleven tales that make up Return to Nevèrÿon are set before the dawn of history. Nevèrÿon (pronounced "Ne-VER-y-on" according to the preface to Tales of Nevèrÿon) is the fictional land the stories are set in, a name derived from the aristocratic neighborhood of Neveryóna (pronounced "Ne-ver-y-O-na") in the capital city Kolhari. The men and women of the reigning civilization have brown to black skin. Barbarian tribes live to the south: a people with pale skin, yellow hair, and light eyes. By the time the stories start, clearly some amount of racial mixing has occurred. But the barbarians were for many years the slaves of the dominant brown-skinned culture, especially for mining and agriculture (as we learn in both “The Tale of Gorgik” and Neveryóna) – and in many places still are.

Many of the stories have different protagonists and, indeed, different sets of foreground characters. But all take a greater or lesser part in recounting an overall story running through the whole series, the history of a man called Gorgik the Liberator.

The eleven stories are collected in four volumes, put out by Wesleyan University Press. At the end of the fourth book, Return to Nevèrÿon (1996), the first tale is reprinted, not so much to emphasize the cyclic nature of the series but to highlight how different a second reading makes the story seem once one has read the intervening tales.

The stories themselves are discussed in the articles devoted to each individual volume.

== Structure and genre ==
A number of the Nevèrÿon stories are novella (or short-novel) length, including the seventh tale, "The Tale of Fog and Granite" (1984); the ninth tale and the first novel-length treatment of AIDS from a major U.S. publisher, "The Tale of Plagues and Carnivals” (1984); the tenth tale, "The Game of Time and Pain" (1985); and the eleventh, "The Tale of Rumor and Desire" (1987). The sixth story, Neveryóna, or: The Tale of Signs and Cities (1981), is a full-length 380 page novel. As well, a set of appendices and an over-all introduction are fixed to the project, all of which have elements that make them part of the fiction. The introduction to the first volume of stories, Tales of Nevèrÿon, is presumably written by a young black woman academic, "K. Leslie Steiner", for example, who turns out to be a character in the ninth tale, "The Tale of Plagues and Carnivals". The first appendix to the novel Neveryóna is an exchange of letters between a fictive character, S. L. Kermit (who also appears in "Plagues and Carnivals" and is the "author" of the appendix to the first volume, Tales of Nevèrÿon) and one Charles Hoequist, Jr., who, unlike the fictitious Steiner and Kermit, is an actual person—a graduate student in linguistics at Yale University during the early eighties when Delany was first writing the stories.

Science fiction and the fantasy subgenre "sword and sorcery" (the term was coined by science fiction writer Fritz Leiber, author of the sword-and-sorcery series, Fafhrd and the Gray Mouser) both have a history of “series” stories—sets of tales with continuing characters and/or continuing locations. In his “Introduction” to Joanna Russ's series, The Adventures of Alyx, first written for the Gregg Press Science Fiction Library series publication of the single volume collection of Russ's stories in 1977, Delany makes several statements that throw light on his own sword-and-sorcery series, which he began the following year. In that Introduction he wrote:

For sword and sorcery to be at its best, one needs a landscape that is ‘on the brink of civilization’ in an almost scientifically ideal way. It is only here that one can truly play the game.

As well, in discussing the relation between sword and sorcery and science fiction, Delany notes: “sword and sorcery represents what can still be imagined about the transition between a barter economy and a money economy,” while “science fiction represents what can be most safely imagined about the transition from a money economy to a credit economy”. He goes on to redescribe this relationship in terms of a mathematical theory, put forward by G. Spencer-Brown, having to do with content, image, and reflection, which basically holds that when one moves from a content to an image to a reflection, one reverses the form of the content. This is a complicated idea, but it is also a central trope of the series and is dramatized and redramatized throughout the Nevèrÿon tales in many different forms, perhaps most clearly in the second story in the first volume of tales, “The Tale of Old Venn". Hardly a tale in the cycle of eleven fails to appeal to this concept in some form.

When he was actually in the midst of writing the series, in a discussion of the formal way the stories in a series differ from the chapters in a novel, in a later interview Delany wrote that in the series: "Put simply, the first story poses a problem and finally offers some solution. But in the next story what was the solution of the first story is now the problem. In general the solution for story N becomes the problem of story N + 1. This allows the writer to go back and critique his own ideas as they develop over time. Often of course the progression isn’t all that linear. Sometimes a whole new problem will insert itself into the writer’s concern—another kind of critique of past concerns. Sometimes you’ll rethink things in stories more than one back. But the basic factor is the idea of a continuous, open-ended, self-critical dialogue." Delany goes on to say: "The series is very flexible. Here’s a short story. Next’s a bulky novel. That can be followed by a novella, or another novel, or another short story... (One good form of criticism comes from asking the question, ‘What, historically, might have caused people to act in a particular way that, when I wrote the last story, I just assumed was unquestioned human nature?’)". Delany wanted something that was coherent but supple and self-critical. In the same interview he says that the story series is, in many ways, closer to the continuous modernist “longpoem,” such as Ezra Pound’s Cantos or Robert Duncan’s “Structure of Ryme” or “Passages,” Anne Waldman’s Jovis, or Rachel Blau Du Plessis’s Drafts.

Other important influences are the work of the French psychiatrist Jacques Lacan (discussed in parts of the appendix, "Closures and Openings", in the final volume, Return to Nevèrÿon), as well as critical theory in general. Each of the stories begins with an epigraph from a theoretical thinker.

Other literary sources that Delany himself has cited are the tales of the English language Danish writer Isak Dinesen and the French writer Marguerite Yourcenar.

== "Some Informal Remarks Toward the Modular Calculus" ==
Through the course of Return to Nevèrÿon, Delany connects it to a larger project, "Some Informal Remarks Toward the Modular Calculus". The first part of this work is his science fiction novel Trouble on Triton (1976), which functions as a prologue to the Nevèrÿon tales. The second part of "The Informal Remarks" is the second appendix to that novel, "Ashima Slade and the Harbin-Y Lectures". Apparently the first five stories of Return to Nevèrÿon, the fiction proper in Tales of Nevèrÿon, manage to slip outside the overall project. Part Three of the "Informal Remarks" is the first appendix to that volume, by "S. L. Kermit". This is the discussion of the supposed source of all the Nevèrÿon tales in an ancient manuscript known as the "Culhar' Fragment" or the "Missolongi Codex", an ancient text of some nine hundred words, which exists in "numerous" translations in many ancient languages. It is presumed to be a translation of humanity's first ancient attempt at writing. But because of the many ancient translations, no one is really sure which actually came first. Kermit's discussion even takes in a theory by an actual archaeologist who did her work in the early eighties, Denise Schmandt-Besserat, which proposes an earlier "token" writing using sculpted beads for words and ideas; according to Schmandt-Besserat, the earliest cuneiform writing that we have today is a matter of these "tokens" first pressed into clay to leave an imprint. Later the same marks were drawn on soft clay with a sharp stick, which eventually led to writing. Apparently, according to the essay, a fragment of the "Culhar’ Fragment" even exists in a "token writing" version.

Part Four of "Some Informal Remarks" is the novel Neveryóna, and Part Five is the AIDS novella, "The Tale of Plagues and Carnivals". Starting with Trouble of Triton, the “Informal Remarks” are constituted by the sections in which the doubling (discussed earlier in this article) has most to do with writing. In "Closures and Openings” (in Return to Nevèrÿon), section 15 discusses the Modular Calculus directly, for those who need a helping hand or who have not carefully pursued the notion for themselves through all the "Informal Remarks". As Delany puts it in another interview, "The Second Science Fiction Studies Interview", he quotes from "The Informal Remarks, Part II" (the second appendix to Trouble on Triton), "How can one relational system model another? . . . What must pass from system-A to System-B for us (system-C) to be able to say that system-B now contains some model of system-A? . . . Granted the proper passage, what must be the internal structure of system-B for us (or it) to say it contains any model of system-A?”. In the interview Delany goes on to answer his own question: “The question encompasses the semiotic situation, since the answer to the second part of the question ("What must pass from system-A to System-B...") is some form of the answer ‘signs’; and the answer to the third part ("...what must be the internal structure of system-B for us (or it) to say it contains any model of system-A?”) is: "Clearly it must be of an internal structure that allows it to interpret signs—i.e., its internal structure must be one that allows it to perform some sort of semiosis." To the extent that Return to Nevèrÿon deals with narrativity and writing, this would explain one of Delany's comments about this major project, that Return to Nevèrÿon was conceived as "a child’s garden of semiotics."

== Publication data ==
- Delany, Samuel R. (1979). Tales of Nevèrÿon. Bantam Books. ISBN 0-553-12333-5.
- Delany, Samuel R. (1983). Neveryóna. Bantam Books. ISBN 0-553-01434-X.
- Delany, Samuel R. (1985). Flight from Nevèrÿon. Bantam Books. ISBN 0-553-24856-1.
- Delany, Samuel R. (1994). Return to Nevèrÿon. Wesleyan University Press. ISBN 0-8195-6278-5.

== Sources ==
- Delany, Samuel R. (1977). "Alyx" (an introduction to Joanna Russ' The Adventures of Alyx) in The Jewel-Hinged Jaw. New York: Berkeley Books.
- Delany, Samuel R. (1989). The Straits of Messina. Seattle: Serconia Press. ISBN 0-934933-04-9
- Delany, Samuel R. (1994). "The Semiology of Silence," in Silent Interviews. Hanover and London: Wesleyan University Press. ISBN 0-8195-6280-7
- Delany, Samuel R. (2000). “Neither the First Word nor the Last on Deconstruction, Structuralism, and Poststructuralism,” in Shorter Views. Wesleyan University Press. ISBN 0-8195-6369-2
- James, Kenneth R. (1996). “Subverted Equations: G. Spencer Brown's Laws of Form and Samuel R. Delany's Analytics of Attention” in Ash of Stars; On the Writings of Samuel R. Delany, edited by James Sallis. Jackson: University of Mississippi Press. ISBN 978-0-87805-852-5
- Spencer, Kathleen (1996). "Nevèrÿon Deconstructed: Samuel R. Delany's Tales of Nevèrÿon and the 'Modular Calculus'" in Ash of Stars; On the Writings of Samuel R. Delany, edited by James Sallis. Jackson: University of Mississippi Press. ISBN 978-0-87805-852-5
- Tucker, Jeffrey Allen (2004). A Sense of Wonder: Samuel R. Delany, Race, Identity, and Difference. Wesleyan University Press. ISBN 978-0-8195-6689-8
