= The Wall Around Eden =

1989 science fiction novel by Joan Slonczewski

- First edition cover
- Author: Joan Slonczewski
- Cover artist: Nicholas Jainschigg
- Language: English
- Genre: Science fiction; post-apocalyptic fiction
- Publisher: William Morrow
- Publication date: September 1989
- Publication place: United States
- Media type: Hardback
- Pages: 288
- ISBN: 978-1-55710-030-6

The Wall Around Eden is a 1989 post-apocalyptic science fiction novel by American microbiologist and science fiction writer Joan Slonczewski. It was first published in the United States in September 1989 by William Morrow and Company, and in the United Kingdom by The Women's Press in March 1991. It was translated into Italian and published by Editrice Nord as Le mura dell'Eden in May 1991.

The entry for Slonczewski in The Encyclopedia of Science Fiction states that The Wall Around Eden includes alien keeps and hive minds, but central to the story is an "unassuming but deeply felt concern with Ecology as interwoven with human Religion".^{[capitals in the source]}

== Plot introduction ==
A global nuclear war has left Earth uninhabitable, except for a handful of settlements around the planet. These communities have been protected from the nuclear fallout by airwalls erected by aliens using force fields. Within each enclave stands a Pylon, a six-sided pyramid from which small floating spheres observe the inhabitants. A small airwall also surrounds the Pylon for protection.

Isabel is a teenager living in Gwynwood, Pennsylvania, one of the few walled settlements across the world. Its inhabitants are mostly Quakers who accept the aliens as saviors, and call the mysterious floating eyes, "angelbees". But Isabel questions the visitors' motives and is determined to investigate further. She learns that the angelbees see in infrared, and after acquiring a scale one of the angelbees had shed, Isabel discovers that by placing it over her eyes, she can also see in infrared and becomes paired with this angelbee. Using her angelbee, Isabel is able to penetrate the Pylon's force field and finds herself in a hypersphere with forests full of birds and animals, many long extinct on Earth. There, Isabel learns that in addition to angelbees, there are also goatsnakes and keepers, all of which are part of an alien hive mind in orbit around Earth.

== Critical reception ==
In a review of The Wall Around Eden in Vector, the journal of the British Science Fiction Association, Nik Morton called the novel "an interesting work". He said the characters are "realistically drawn, with human failings … and [n]o spectacular heroics", while the aliens are not without their own flaws. Morton described the story as "[b]enign, mysterious, but not evil", and added that "[t]here is a world of understanding here, which would repay a second reading." American science fiction author and critic Baird Searles called The Wall Around Eden "a nice little novel" and "[h]ow many … are there around these days?" In a review in Isaac Asimov's Science Fiction Magazine Searles wrote, "It's a relief to get a post-holocaust, occupied-Earth story that isn't all violence and anarchy."

Jackie Cassada recommended the book for science fiction fans. She wrote in Library Journal that Slonczewski "juxtaposes the horrors of nuclear aftermath and the persistence of human hope with rare skill and grace." A reviewer at Publishers Weekly described The Wall Around Eden as "a thoughtful and unusual after-the-holocaust novel". They said the story's pace is "slow but careful" and the characters are "beautifully developed". British science fiction author Ian Sales wrote in Locus magazine that The Wall Around Eden has a "well-drawn cast" with a "smart, engaging heroine". He said "it's a masterclass in sf writing", and deserves a new edition.

Reviewing the novel in The Washington Post, American science fiction author Richard Grant stated that The Wall Around Eden "reads like a post-holocaust bedtime story for young scientists". He said Slonczewski has used her background as a biologist to create "the most fascinating race of bug-eyed monsters since Michael Shea's Polyphemus. But Grant was more critical of the human characters, calling them "less plausible". He felt that Isabel and her friends are too "squeaky clean", and do not react as one would expect to having their lives upended by aliens.

British science fiction author Gill Alderman was more critical of the book. In a review in Foundation, journal of the Science Fiction Foundation, she described The Wall Around Eden as "very uneven". She found it "sad and vexing" that Slonczewski "has reduced her promising material to the level of a solemn and passionless parable by choosing to tell the story … by weaving into it the rough and clumsy skein of extra-terrestrial intervention and control." Alderman cited several "failures of author sensibility", including how her Pylon, that "strange and other-worldly device" with "respectable mythic and classical antecedents", performs Earthly tasks like delivering the Sydney Herald from Australia to Gwynwood, Pennsylvania. She noted that the book's publisher called it "a novel based on the cutting-edge of science and startling biological speculation", yet it contains several scientific inaccuracies. One example is that there is no greenhouse effect after the book's nuclear winter, which would have melted the polar ice caps and flooded Sydney. Alderman stated that, for her, the book's only memorable scene was the stacks of bones from people and animals drawn to the warmth of the Gwynwood eden, but were unable to penetrate the wall surrounding it.
