= The Harvey School =

Location
- 260 Jay Street; Katonah, New York 10536; United States; 41.254837°N 73.666779°W

Information
- Type: Private, Boarding, Preparatory School
- Established: 1916; 110 years ago
- Founder: Dr. Herbert Carter
- Head of school: Dr. Paul Adler
- Grades: 6–12
- Colors: Maroon and Blue
- Mascot: Cavalier
- Accreditation: NYSAIS
- Website: www.harveyschool.org

The Harvey School is a co-educational, college preparatory school near Katonah, New York, for students in grades 6 through 12. It is located on a wooded, 125-acre campus and has an annual tuition (2024) of $52,680.

== History ==
The Harvey School was founded in 1916 in Hawthorne, New York by Dr. Herbert Carter as a residential school for boys, enrolling students through the secondary grades. Dr. Carter, a New York City pediatrician, built the school on his farm with the intention of providing a country environment and an educational program for his physically handicapped son, Herbert Swift Carter, Jr. He named the school for Sir William Harvey (1578–1657), personal physician of King Charles I who is considered one of the fathers of modern medical science. In 1959, the school lost its Hawthorne campus due to construction of a cloverleaf highway interchange on the Taconic and Sprain Parkways, and moved to its current 100-acre (40 ha) campus on the former Sylvan Weil Estate in Katonah.

== Student Demographics ==
The Harvey School's Upper School enrolls approximately 294 students, including 76 in the Class of 2025. About 32% of students receive need-based financial aid, and 34% identify as racially or ethnically diverse. Students come from a wide geographic area, including New York City, Westchester, Putnam, Dutchess, and Orange counties, as well as Connecticut, New Jersey, and international locations. Twelve percent of students participate in the school’s boarding program, with 5% representing international backgrounds. The international student population includes individuals from countries such as Germany, Mexico, New Zealand, Spain, Poland, China, South Korea, and Austria. The school offers a 5-day boarding program that combines weekday dormitory living with weekend homestays. Harvey emphasizes a diverse student body within a traditional and structured educational environment.

== Athletic teams ==
The Harvey School's athletic teams are known as the Cavaliers, and their colors are maroon and blue. The following competitive sports are offered at The Harvey School.

- Cross Country (co-ed)
- Football (boys)
- Soccer (boys and girls)
- Volleyball (girls)
- Track & Field (co-ed)
- Basketball (boys and girls)
- Ice Hockey (boys)
- Skiing (co-ed)
- Baseball (boys)
- Lacrosse (boys and girls)
- Golf (co-ed)
- Rugby (boys and girls)
- Tennis (boys and girls)

The Harvey School is a part of the Housatonic Valley Athletic League (HVAL) and the New England Preparatory School Athletic Council (NEPSAC).

== Arts Program ==
The Harvey School offers a comprehensive arts program that encompasses both visual and performing arts. Students have access to studios dedicated to art, dance, media production, ceramics, graphic design, and photography. The school's arts faculty are professionally trained artists who lead a wide range of classes and private instrumental lessons offered on campus. Harvey produces ten annual theater productions, which are staged in the school’s 250-seat black box theater. Students also have opportunities to exhibit their work in local art museums and community venues. The Visiting Artists Series invites professional painters, potters, photographers, illustrators, and dancers to campus, where they engage directly with students through workshops and classroom visits.

== Robotics Program ==
The Harvey School's robotics program offers students opportunities to compete at local, regional, national, and international levels. Supported by a dedicated robotics lab and a curriculum that includes introductory, advanced, and competition-level courses, the program emphasizes hands-on learning and skill development. Harvey robotics teams have earned over 100 national and international awards, including 13 Excellence Awards (notably at the 2021 VEX Robotics World Championship), 31 Design Awards, and 61 Tournament Champion titles, as well as recognition for innovation, skills, and engineering.
