= A Door into Ocean =

1986 novel by Joan Slonczewski

- Author: Joan Slonczewski
- Cover artist: Ron Walotsky
- Language: English
- Series: Elysium Cycle
- Genre: Science fiction
- Published: 1986 (Arbor House) (New York)
- Publication place: United States
- Media type: Print (hardback & paperback)
- ISBN: 0-87795-763-0
- OCLC: 12103029
- Dewey Decimal: 813/.54 19
- LC Class: PS3569.L65 D6 1986
- Followed by: Daughter of Elysium

A Door into Ocean is a 1986 feminist science fiction novel by Joan Slonczewski. It is the first book in Slonczewski's Elysium Cycle. The novel's themes include ecofeminism and nonviolent revolution, as well as Slonczewski's own knowledge in the field of biology.

== Plot ==
The novel is set in the future, on the fictional planets of Shora and Valedon. Shora is a moon of Valedon, covered by water. The inhabitants of this planet, known as Sharers, are all female. Sharers use genetic engineering to control the ecology of their planet. They are peaceful beings who "share"—that is, they have a spiritual and linguistic union with each other and treat everyone equally. Valedon, by contrast, is one of many planets ruled by a transhuman figure called "The Patriarch."

At the beginning of the novel, the Sharers encounter a non-Sharer community from another planet, which threatens them. The Sharer Merwen the Impatient realizes that they must find out whether other kinds of "people" can share their life or not. Merwen goes to Valedon, to recruit a young Valan, Spinel, to return to Shora and attempt to learn their ways. This venture leads to disagreement within the Sharer community, despite the fact that a Valan noblewoman, Lady Berenice, who takes the Sharer name, Nisi the Deceiver, has lived amongst the Sharers before. Berenice, daughter of the first traders to settle on Shora, spent her childhood among the Sharers and returned to Valedon to spend time with her fiancé, Realgar, a Sardish Valan general.

To Spinel's initial distress, after some time on Shora, his skin takes on a purple hue as his body becomes acclimated to the breathmicrobes that allow Sharers to stay longer underwater. He gradually learns the Sharer way, as a man and is finally accepted by Merwen's daughter, Lystra, who risks her life to save him from a Shockwraith, a deadly underwater creature. Lystra's former 'lovesharer', Rilwen, is "stonesick", meaning that she has developed an addictive fascination with the stones and gems the Valan traders bring to Shora. After Rilwen's death, Lystra and Spinel become lovesharers.

Realgar and Malachite, an envoy of the Patriarch, visit Shora to place it under Patriarchal rule. After this visit, Realgar, Berenice, and Spinel return to Valedon. Berenice eventually realizes Realgar has no intention of letting her return to Shora and that the Patriarch has arranged for Shora to come under patriarchal rule rather than exist self-governed. She fakes her death and sneaks away to Shora, despite the fact that travel has become forbidden. Meanwhile, Spinel returns to his family, who are living under Dolomite rule after the siege of their city. He helps the citizens stage a peaceful act of rebellion against the Dolomites and becomes a "spirit caller." When Spinel hears what has happened to Shora while he has been away, he returns to the capital of Valedon to try and gain passage back to Shora.

Realgar, still grieving the death of Berenice but obeying orders, returns to Shora to force the Sharers to obey Patriarchal rule and Valan law. The Sharers peacefully continue their way of life, despite the increasing military presence and escalating violence of Realgar's soldiers. Realgar has several Sharers kidnapped and probed for information, though the Sharers enter "whitetrance", a vulnerable state close to death in which their bodies turn wholly white as their minds retreat within. Some kidnapped Sharers, including Lystra, are taken to Valedon. Spinel sees Lystra and calls out to her, breaking her whitetrance. Spinel's ability to reach the Sharers causes Realgar to take him and the Sharers back to Shora, where the Sharers are tortured. Several of Realgar's soldiers become increasingly sympathetic to the Sharers. Among them is the scientist, Siderite, who is tasked with learning the Sharer's advanced science for the Patriarch and becomes apprenticed to Usha, a "lifesharer" who practices advanced medicine.

After finding out Berenice still lives, Realgar publicly executes several Sharers, and almost executes Merwen before taking her back to the military compound. Merwen attempts to "share" with Realgar to cure him of what the Sharers consider the Valan's sickness, the fear that causes them to "hasten death" (kill). The Sharers continue to protest through non-violence, though this results in many Sharer deaths. They discover a cure for the microbes the Valans have released to keep away the dangerous seaswallowers and counteract it to allow the seaswallowers to return and bring the planet back into harmony. The return of the seaswallowers nearly destroys the Valan military compounds, forcing the Valan troops to withdraw. Travel between the two planets becomes banned. Berenice remains on Shora, while Spinel almost returns to Valedon to spread nonviolent resistance against the Patriarch. However, when Lystra decides not to follow, Spinel decides to stay as well.

== Major themes ==
=== Ecofeminism ===
Slonczewski's Sharers are committed to environmental sustainability. They restrict their own reproduction to sustainable levels and view all species on their world as interconnected, including seaswallowers, a dangerous species that often destroy the rafts on which Sharers live and whose natural actions result in the deaths of Sharers. The Sharer worldview extends to their environment, their surrounding ecosystem. They cannot act upon their plants and animals without being acted upon in return. So, for example, because Sharers consume plants and animals as food, they accept the fact that they in turn will become food for other life forms; that predators will ultimately consume them.

Slonczewski's premise associates the exploitative and patriarchal practices of Valedon as males and ecological wisdom as female. Eric C. Otto argues that Slonczewski subverts this essentialism by depicting women, not as more in tune with ecology than men, but as allies with the non-human natural due to their shared subordinate status under patriarchy and their subjection to capitalist practices. The Sharers are not depicted as "noble savages" nor are they aligned with nature because they lack technology; rather, the Sharers are revealed to be extremely technologically knowledgeable and use their advanced scientific techniques for ecological purposes.

=== Language ===
A unique expression of the Sharer way is their language, in which subject and object are interchangeable. The Sharers know by context what subject and object are—but their language is bidirectional and does not make a distinction. As a result, they always know that what one person "forces" upon another can always go the other way. Their language impedes anyone from "giving orders" to dominate others. For example, if a stranger says, "You must obey me," the Sharer hears, "I must obey you," or (the closest translation), "We must share agreement." Their language reinforces the Sharers' inability to accept any situation in which one individual dominates another by force.

Even the language's verbs enforce the Sharer's beliefs. All verbs "embed the notion of reciprocity in every action" says Vint, who gives the verb examples, “learnsharing, worksharing, lovesharing” (37). The verb "hitsharing" is also an example because the verb is described as hitting a rock, which will hit back in turn, because of the vibrations one feels on their arms. In this way, the Sharers' language attributes agency beyond the human, with even non-living matter having the capacity to act.

=== Non-violence ===
Sharers do not engage in physical violence as, in the Sharer language, to hurt is to be hurt. However, Slonczewski is also careful not to clearly assign violence and non-violence strictly along Sharer/Valan or male/female lines. Some Sharers are willing to attempt violence, while some Valans, both male and female, embrace the Sharer lifestyle and ideals.

The Sharers take egalitarianism for granted because they share and they lack the concept of "power-over", making their society one in which conflicts are settled without violence. When they are being threatened by an outside power, they resist nonviolently because they refuse to believe in power. Thus, the Sharers can never be subdued by force. The Sharer way of nonviolence is more than spiritual. It is based on historical realities of nonviolent resistance. The author based the events of their novel on much historical research, particularly the writings of peace historian Gene Sharp. The novel includes much biological research into the evolution of innate capacities for nonviolence. For example, the participation of children in nonviolent resistance draws on deep instinctual responses found in humans and related mammals.

=== LGBT themes ===
The novel has been described as depicting a "lesbian feminist eco-utopia" and lesbian separatism. The women of Shora love and reproduce with each other, while homosexuality is illegal on Valedon and referred to as "immoral cohabitation." Slonczewski has stated that "The ocean women of A Door into Ocean are pansexual – they love regardless of gender".

Jane L. Donawerth argues that A Door Into Ocean complicates the conventions of science fiction lesbian separatist utopias through the incorporation of a young male into the Sharers of Shora. She writes that Spinel "is asked to become a truly female man, a lesbian man" in entering a sexual relationship with Lystra, a Sharer, without penetration.

=== Quakerism ===
The Sharers' nonviolence is a reflection of Slonczewski's Quaker ethos. Slonczewski has said that, "Sharers have a lot in common with Quakers, particularly in the dynamic of their "meetings.""

== Development history ==
Slonczewski described her motiviations to write A Door Into Ocean, saying "I really wanted to write about how the countries of Eastern Europe could free themselves from Soviet domination." The book was rejected by Del Rey Books, which had published Slonczewski's earlier novel, Still Forms on Foxfield, as well as several other publishers. In an interview, Slonczewski explained that these rejections by saying, "This was before the collapse of the Soviet Union, and there was an absolute dogma that peace never works. Nobody wanted to look at a book that said otherwise."

A Door Into Ocean is the first book in the Elysium series, and is followed by Daughter of Elysium (1993), The Children Star (1998), and Brain Plague (2000).

== Publication history ==
- 1986, USA, Arbor House, ISBN 978-0-87795-763-8, February 1986, Hardcover
- 1987, USA, Avon Books, ISBN 978-0-380-70150-6, February 1987, Paperback
- 1987, UK, Women's Press, ISBN 978-0-7043-4069-5, June 1987, Paperback
- 2000, USA, Orb Books, ISBN 978-0-312-87652-4, October 2000, Paperback

== Literary significance and reception ==
The 1985 Library Journal review highly recommended this novel, saying "Slonczewski creates an all-female nonviolent culture that reaches beyond feminism to a new definition of human nature".

=== In other culture ===
New York artist, Ziemba, released a "sonic fragrance mist" in 2017 named "A Door Into Ocean", after Slonczewski's novel.

== Awards and nominations ==
- A Door into Ocean won the 1987 John W. Campbell Memorial Award for Best Science Fiction Novel – first time this award was won by a woman
- It was a nominee for the 1987 Prometheus Award for Best Novel
