= John Jay Homestead State Historic Site =

- John Jay Homestead
- U.S. National Register of Historic Places
- U.S. National Historic Landmark
- New York State Register of Historic Places
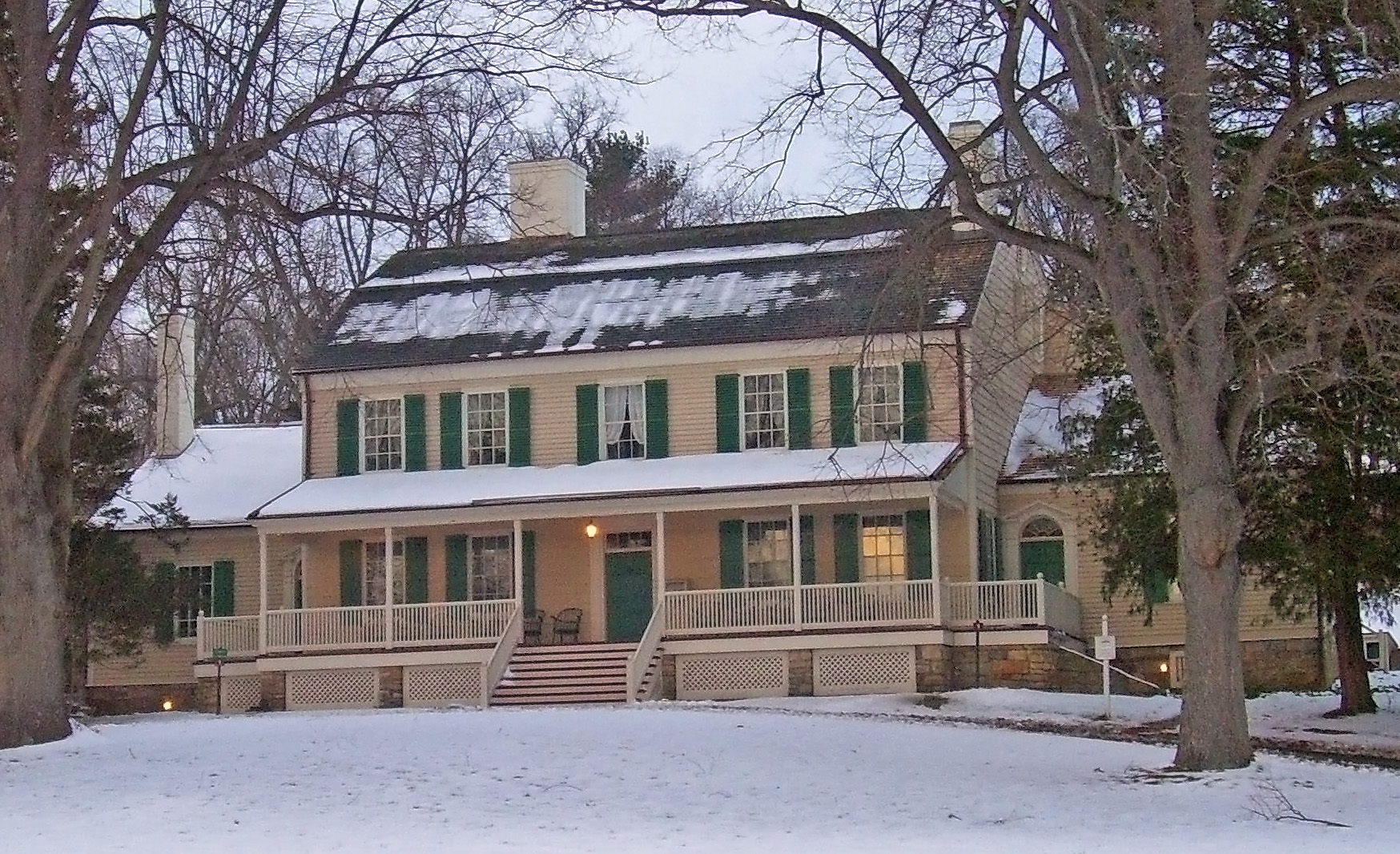
- In 2007

- Location within New York Location within the United States
- Location: 400 Jay St., Katonah, NY
- Coordinates: 41°15′1″N 73°39′31″W
- Area: 58.9 acres (23.8 ha)
- Built: 1787–1790
- Architects: John Cooley and Moses Winian
- Architectural style: Georgian
- Website: www.JohnJayHomestead.org
- NRHP reference No.: 72000918
- NYSRHP No.: 11901.000020

Significant dates
- Added to NRHP: July 24, 1972
- Designated NHL: May 29, 1981
- Designated NYSRHP: June 23, 1980

The John Jay Homestead State Historic Site is located at 400 Jay Street in Katonah, New York. The site preserves the 1787 home of Founding Father and statesman John Jay (1745–1829), one of the three authors of The Federalist Papers and the first Chief Justice of the United States. The property was designated a National Historic Landmark in 1981 for its association with Jay. The house has been closed since 2020 for restoration.

== Description and history ==
The John Jay Homestead is located in a rural setting east of the village of Katonah, on the north side of Jay Street (New York State Route 22). It is a 2 1/2-story gambrel-roofed brick building, with single-story gable-roofed wings to either side. The main facade is five bays wide, with sash windows arranged symmetrically around the centered entrance. The center bay is slightly wider than the others, and the entrance is topped by a four-light transom window. A shed-roof porch shelters the entire span of the first floor, wrapping around in open sections to secondary entrances in the side wings.

The home was constructed in two major phases, on 600 acres (240 ha) of land that was part of a larger 5,200-acre (2,100 ha) parcel that John Jay's maternal grandfather Jacobus Van Cortlandt purchased from Chief Katonah around 1700. Jay made arrangements in February 1787 with brickmakers and carpenters for the first phase of construction, which was completed in 1790. The second phase, executed in 1800–01, included the extension of the main block to five bays and the addition of the wings (one replacing the first kitchen wing). Jay, whose long and illustrious career included the Continental Congress, drafting of New York's first state constitution, Governor of New York, and Chief Justice of both New York's Supreme Court and the United States Supreme Court, spent his retirement years on this property.

The house remained in the Jay family until 1959, when it was given to Westchester County, which turned it over to New York State. The state undertook the reversal of some alterations made after Jay's ownership, and opened it as a historic site. In 1977, the non-profit Friends of John Jay Homestead was founded to increase public awareness of the site. It raises funds and provides volunteer assistance for the Homestead's preservation, restoration and interpretation.

The house was declared a National Historic Landmark in 1981.

== 1926 Fire ==
On November 27th, 1926 a fire, believed to have been started by a painter's torch, damaged a large portion of the house. The roof was destroyed as were portions of the third story and the northeastern section of the second floor. The owners, with help from neighbors and fire fighters, were able to save paintings and antiques. Smoke and water from the rescue damaged interiors and the first and second floors. The owners, Mr. and Mrs. Iselin rebuilt sections of the house. The reconstruction took one and a half years and the structure was somewhat returned to its early 19th century appearance with the removal of a gable and the addition of 4 new dormers to match old images.

== Enslaved persons' burial ground ==
The existence of a burial ground for enslaved people on the Jay farm in Bedford was noted in the 1950s. The graves were marked with local stones and dicovered by a local resident.

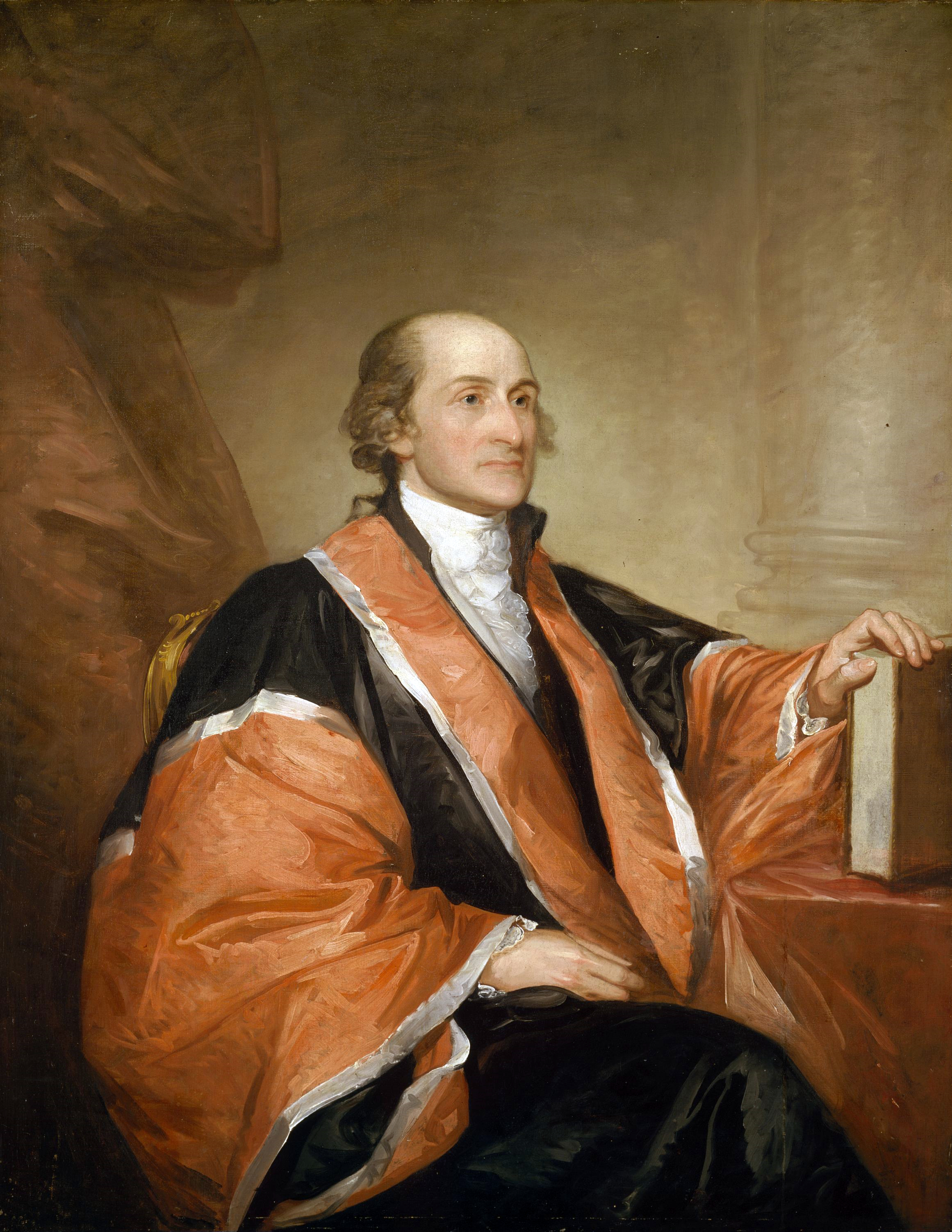
Portrait of John Jay by Gilbert Stuart, 1794

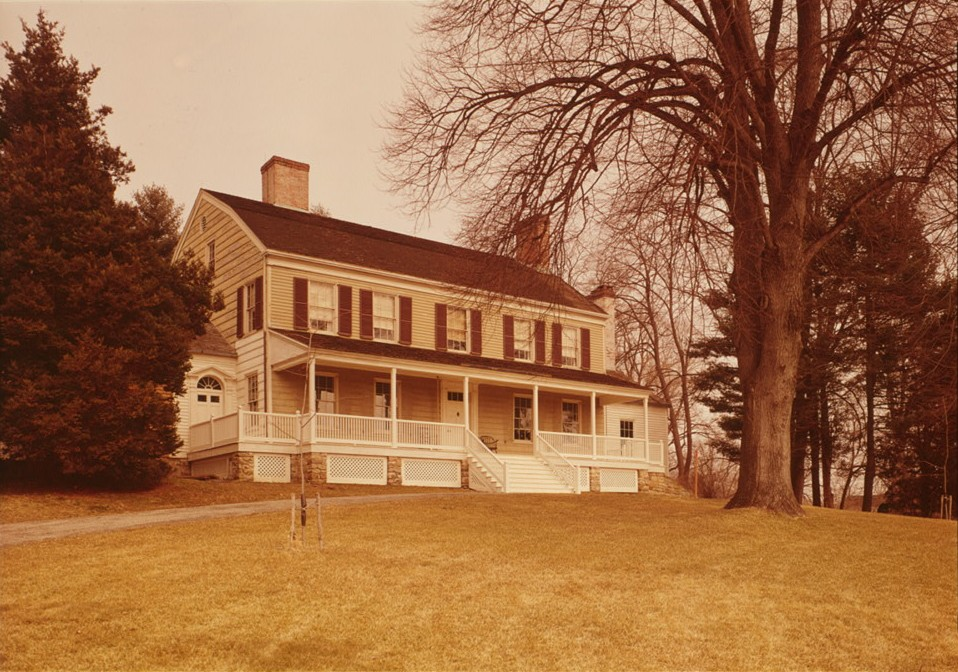
South perspective view in 1961 (HABS)

== Legacy ==
In 2004, the landmark, known as Bedford House, was added to the African American Heritage Trail of Westchester County, a group of 16 sites which include the Rye African-American Cemetery, Saint Paul's Church National Historic Site and the Jay Estate in Rye.

== See also ==
- List of National Historic Landmarks in New York
- List of New York State Historic Sites
- National Register of Historic Places listings in northern Westchester County, New York
