= Flight from Nevèrÿon =

1985 story collection by Samuel R. Delany

- Cover from the first edition
- Author: Samuel R. Delany
- Cover artist: Rowena Morrill
- Language: English
- Series: Return to Nevèrÿon
- Genre: Sword and Sorcery
- Publisher: Bantam Books
- Publication date: 1985
- Publication place: United States
- Media type: Print (paperback)
- Pages: 385 pp
- ISBN: 0-553-24856-1
- OCLC: 12043382
- Preceded by: Neveryóna
- Followed by: Return to Nevèrÿon

Flight from Nevèrÿon is a collection of sword and sorcery stories by Samuel R. Delany. It is the third of the four-volume Return to Nevèrÿon series. The volume contains three stories and two appendices.

== Contents ==
The following table of contents is from the most recent Wesleyan University Press edition:

- "The Tale of Fog and Granite"
- "The Mummer’s Tale"
- "The Tale of Plagues and Carnivals, or, Some Informal Remarks toward the Modular Calculus, Part Five"
- Appendix A: Postscript
- Appendix B: Buffon's Needle

In earlier editions, the novel The Tale of Plagues and Carnivals was listed as an appendix; the "Postscript", which brings the story of "Joey" (presumably based on a real person), one of the characters in Plagues and Carnivals, up to date, was not yet included; nor was the discussion with a reader, Robert Wentworth, of "Buffon's Needle," a mathematical reference to something that occurs in tale number six, the full-length novel Neveryóna.

== The Tale of Fog and Granite ==
The first story in the book (and the seventh overall tale in the Return to Nevèrÿon series), “The Tale of Fog and Granite,” is a short novel that basically tells of the many people trying to counterfeit Gorgik the Liberator throughout Nevèrÿon and to use a semblance of his project for their own ends. It dramatizes the problems this makes for a nameless young smuggler who has become fascinated by Gorgik and, though he has never met or seen him, is actively trying to find out anything and everything he can about him — rather like a fan pursuing all information available about a favorite rock singer.

In this same story, we learn how much Gorgik is trying to utilize the confusion these counterfeits cause. (The story contains an extraordinarily sympathetic critique of S&M practices, and how their meaning differs when they occur across different social power boundaries.)

When, indeed, after some harrowing adventures brought about by the pursuit of his obsession with Gorgik, the young smuggler (rescued by Raven) finally gets to meet his hero almost by chance, he cannot even be sure that he has met the true Gorgik — so that he and, moreover, the reader must begin to wonder if there can even be, in such a political hall of mirrors, any such “truth” — or at least a truly effective force for liberation. Is political success perhaps, as Gorgik himself seems to feel, a matter of learning how to organize the mirrors around the hall?

== The Mummer's Tale ==
The next story (the eighth), “The Mummer’s Tale,” abandons Gorgik almost entirely, to tell of the young smuggler's youth as an adolescent hustler on the Bridge of Lost Desire in Kolhari — and his relationship, over a twenty-year period that takes him from sixteen to thirty-six, with an actor in a traveling mummer's troupe. Here the doubling that works through all the tales is with a silent auditor to the mummer's story, a man whom we learn is a teacher, a philosopher, a lover and supporter of the arts (a democratic minded prince, who has given up his title to pursue his intellectual work), and who has known the narrator over the same period, and has been his friend over the same twenty years — but has never met with or known till now the mummer's petty criminal friend.

As the mummer recounts to this “Master” the young thief's bout with madness and his subsequent descent into crime, the parallels that the mummer, however inadvertently, suggests between the two (philosopher and criminal), by the story's end, would seem to have distressed the Master greatly — perhaps in the way that they reveal the extent of — and complexity to — the ways in which desire propels even the most high-minded and intellectual pursuits. This story functions as the ars poetica of the series.

== The Tale of Plagues and Carnivals ==
In the ninth tale of the series (a novel in itself), a fatal sexually related disease breaks out in Nevèrÿon — one that is particularly prevalent among homosexuals. In this story (“The Tale of Plagues and Carnivals” [1984]), the parallels between the way Nevèrÿon handles its situation and the way current day New York City in the second year of the AIDS epidemic handled it become explicit, and the full flexibility of the story series is exploited: Many of the scenes take place in the modern streets of New York City, with reports about actual homeless folk, drug addicts, and hustlers that Delany knew at the time.

The story moves back and forth between the prehistoric and the modern landscape for some extraordinary effects. In the last third of this tale, in an attempt to co-opt Gorgik the Liberator and bring him to heel as well as to distract the people from the “plague” that moves among them, the government invites Gorgik to join the ruling council as a minister — so that he must learn to conclude his battle as a politician rather than as an armed rebel.

A high point of the story is the Master's attempt, as a young man, to travel throughout Nevèrÿon and collect material for a biography of the Barbarian genius Belham, dead a generation before, whose name is connected with many of the land's architectural wonders. A second high point involves the return of the Mummer, from “The Mummer’s Tale,” who offers a devastating critique of the Master's current set of philosophical dialogues, which is set up to suggest a similar order of critique which Socrates might easily have made of Plato, the older philosopher's presumably sympathetic and accurate amanuensis. The Tale of Plagues and Carnivals was the first novel-length treatment of AIDS to appear from a major U.S. publisher (Bantam Books).
