= Joan Slonczewski =

American writer

Joan Lyn Slonczewski
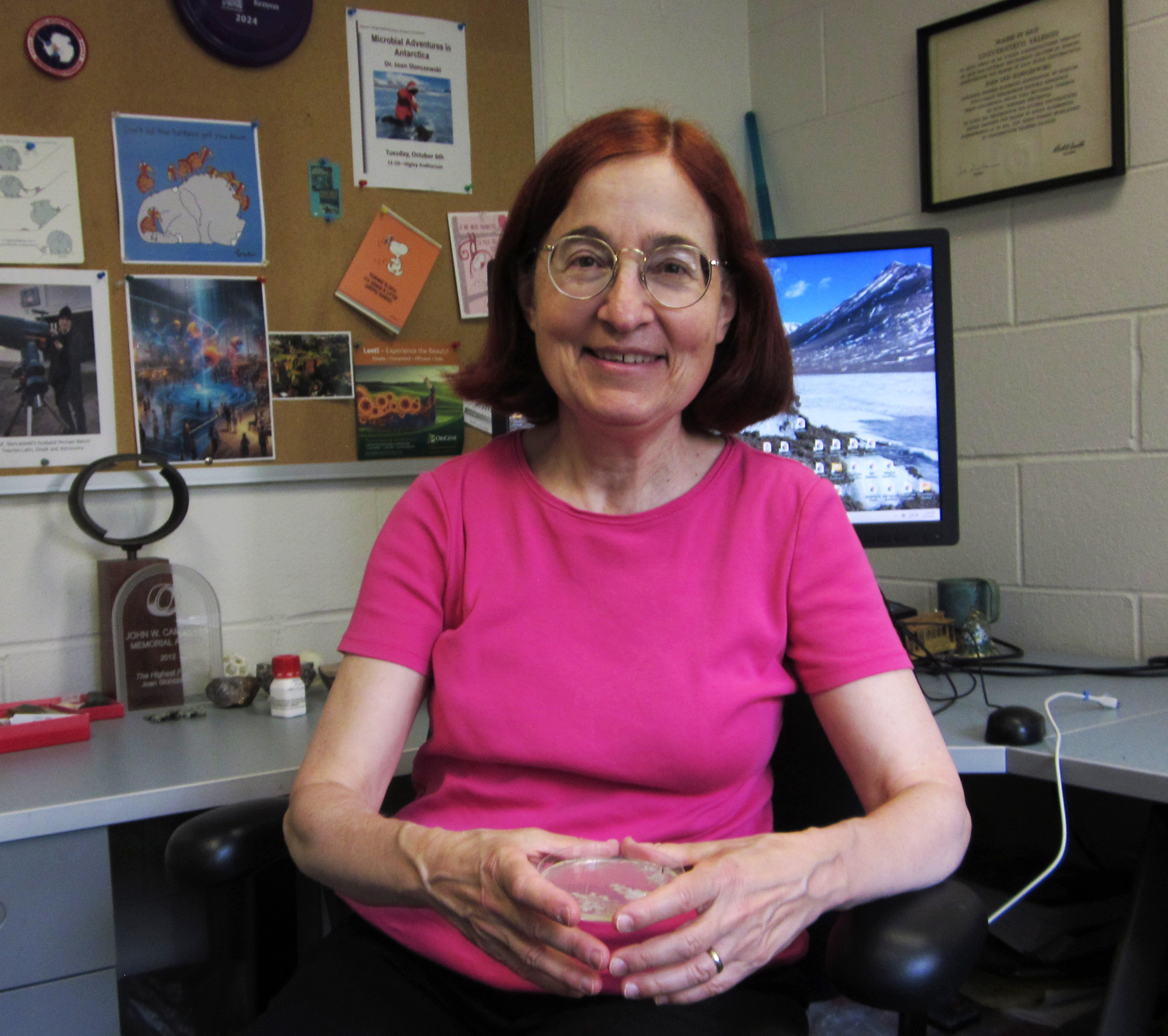
- Slonczewski in 2022
- Born: August 14, 1956 (age 69); Hyde Park, New York, U.S.
- Education: Bryn Mawr College (AB); Yale University (PhD); University of Pennsylvania
- Occupations: Microbiology professor Science fiction author
- Employer: Kenyon College
- Known for: A Door into Ocean
- Website: Homepage

Joan Lyn Slonczewski (born August 14, 1956) is an American microbiologist at Kenyon College and a science fiction writer who explores biology and space travel. Their books have twice earned the John W. Campbell Memorial Award for Best Science Fiction Novel: A Door into Ocean (1987) and The Highest Frontier (2011). With John W. Foster and Erik Zinser, they coauthor the textbook, Microbiology: An Evolving Science (W. W. Norton) now in its fifth edition.

== Biography ==
Slonczewski was born in August 14, 1956 at Hyde Park, New York and raised in Katonah, New York.

They earned an A.B. in biology, magna cum laude, from Bryn Mawr College in 1977. Slonczewski completed a PhD in Molecular Biophysics and Biochemistry from Yale University in 1982 and post-doctoral work at the University of Pennsylvania studying calcium flux in leukocyte chemotaxis. Since 1984 they have taught at Kenyon College, taking sabbatical leaves at Princeton University and the University of Maryland, Baltimore. Slonczewski's research focuses on the pH (environmental) stress response in Escherichia coli and Bacillus subtilis using genetic techniques.

Slonczewski teaches both biology and science fiction courses. From 1996 through 2008, they have been awarded Howard Hughes Medical Institute funding for undergraduate biological sciences education, which they have used to improve science instruction and to foster summer science fellowships for minority and first-generation students.

Dr. Slonczewski was the Hal Clement Science Speaker in February 2011 at the Boskone 48 convention.

Slonczewski is also a member of the Quakers and Quakerism is featured in many of their novels.

== Fiction ==
Slonczewski's 1986 Campbell Award-winning novel A Door into Ocean shows their command of genetics and ecological science, as well as commitment to pacifism and feminism. It depicts the ecosystem of a planet covered entirely by water, inhabited by an exclusively female race of genetic engineers. Daughters of Elysium (1993), The Children Star (1998), and Brain Plague (2000) are loose sequels.

A serialization of Slonczewski's The Children Star (1998) appeared in Analog Science Fiction and Fact, a magazine known for hard science fiction.

Brain Plague (2000) depicts a world where intelligent microbes inhabit human brains. The microbial aliens have potential for great good as well as great evil. They evolve in the same way as pathogens such as HIV or as symbionts such as our digestive bacteria, which help keep humans healthy. Brain Plague tells of a future in which genetic engineering, combined with nanotechnology, can do everything from shaping our bodies to growing enormous buildings for us. In an interview on their writing, Slonczewski related: "One time in class, my students were discussing my book Brain Plague. I asked the class, 'Is this book liberal or conservative?' A student said, 'It's conservative, because all the characters are married.' Another student jumped up, 'It is not conservative!' Half the book's marriages are gay – with a few robots included."

The Highest Frontier (2011) is a coming of age story about the first year in college of Jennifer Ramos Kennedy, a member of the ongoing Kennedy political dynasty. The year is 2108 and Jenny is attending Frontera College, which is located in a space habitation. The earth is being destroyed by human-made ecological catastrophes blamed on the "ultraphytes," UV-photosynthetic plant-animals from outer space. Some political factions are promoting space habitats as a solution, but the spacehabs can only accommodate a tiny percentage of the human population. The political system is grid locked. The Highest Frontier addresses political, social, and environmental issues.

== Awards ==
- Robert Tomsich Award, for outstanding achievement in research in science, Kenyon College, 2001.
- Silver Medalist, National Professor of the Year program, Council for the Advancement and Support of Education, Washington DC, 1989.
- John W. Campbell Memorial Award for Best Science Fiction Novel, A Door into Ocean, 1987.
- John W. Campbell Memorial Award for Best Science Fiction Novel, The Highest Frontier, 2012.

== Bibliography ==
=== Standalone Novels ===
- —— (1980). Still Forms on Foxfield. Tor Books. ISBN 9780380753284.
- —— (1989). The Wall Around Eden. Tor Books. ISBN 9781557100306.
- —— (2011). The Highest Frontier. Tor Books. ISBN 9780765329561.

=== The Elysium Cycle ===
- —— (1986). A Door into Ocean. Tor Books. ISBN 9780877957638.
- —— (1993). Daughter of Elysium. Tor Books. ISBN 9780380972227.
- —— (1998). The Children Star. Tor Books. ISBN 9780312867164.
- —— (2000). Brain Plague. Tor Books. ISBN 9780312867188.
- —— (2025). Minds in Transit. CAEZIK SF & Fantasy. ISBN 9781647101732.

=== Science publications ===
- J. L. Slonczewski, John W. Foster and Erik Zinser, 2020, Microbiology: An Evolving Science 5E, a core microbiology textbook for undergraduate science majors, W. W. Norton & Co., New York. ISBN 0-393-97857-5
