= Tales of Nevèrÿon =

1978 short story collection by Samuel R. Delany

- Cover of the 1979 Bantam Books first edition.
- Author: Samuel R. Delany
- Cover artist: Louis S. Glanzman
- Language: English
- Series: Return to Nevèrÿon
- Genre: Sword and Sorcery novellas
- Publisher: Bantam Books
- Publication date: 1979
- Publication place: United States
- Media type: Print (paperback)
- Pages: 264 pp
- ISBN: 0-553-12333-5
- OCLC: 5464386
- Followed by: Neveryóna

Tales of Nevèrÿon is a collection of five sword and sorcery stories by Samuel R. Delany published in 1978. It is the first of the four-volume Return to Nevèrÿon series and contains the stories "The Tale of Gorgik," "The Tale of Old Venn," "The Tale of Small Sarg," "The Tale of Potters and Dragons," and "The Tale of Dragons and Dreamers."

== Contents ==
The following table of contents is from the most recent Wesleyan University Press edition:

- "Return . . . a preface by K. Leslie Steiner"
- "The Tale of Gorgik"
- "The Tale of Old Venn"
- "The Tale of Small Sarg"
- "The Tale of Potters and Dragons"
- "The Tale of Dragons and Dreamers"
- "Appendix: Some Informal Remarks Toward the Modular Calculus, Part Three by S. L. Kermit"

The 3rd printing of the Wesleyan edition of Tales of Nevèrÿon is currently the most accurate and corrects some errors from previous editions that might actually have confused some particularly careful readers of Delany's series.

== The Tale of Gorgik ==
In his youth Gorgik is one of the “brown, respectable” people of Kolhari, the major port of Nevèrÿon. When he is sixteen, because of a radical takeover of the government, Gorgik is captured and taken as a slave to work in an obsidian mine. Not all the slaves are blond, blue-eyed barbarians, but the ones who are darker-skinned generally fare better than those who are not. Soon Gorgik is a mine foreman. When he is twenty-one, Gorgik is purchased by the Vizerine Myrgot as her lover and is taken to live in the castle of the Child Empress Ynelgo, back in Kolhari, where he gets his first taste of the advantages (and disadvantages) of life among royalty. Eventually the Vizerine frees him and secures him a commission in the army. Upon completion of his commission, Gorgik becomes a smuggler.

In later Nevèrÿon stories, Gorgik becomes an outlaw, for a while even working as a guard for a slave pen. But he is so disgusted by what he sees there that he goes back to being an outlaw, working to free all the slaves of Nevèrÿon, no matter their color. To this end, he makes use of some of the friendships he made while living at the court.

== Themes and criticism ==
Greg Costikyan reviewed Tales of Neveryon in Ares Magazine #1. Costikyan commented that "In Tales of Neveryon [Delany] shows not only that he has not completely succumbed to the modern penchant for meaningless pretension, but that he is still capable of writing a dynamite story."

Bernard W. Bell points out that Tales of Nevèrÿon is thematically concerned with "the reversal of conventional hierarchical, oppositional relationships." Larry McCaffery states that Delany "thoroughly expands, deepens, questions, and undercuts the premises of [the sword-and-sorcery] genre".

== Awards ==
In 1980, Tales of Nevèrÿon was both a Locus Award nominee and a finalist for the National Book Award for Science Fiction.
