= Susan Arnout Smith =

American writer

Susan Arnout Smith (born in Anchorage, Alaska), is a novelist, television scriptwriter, playwright, and essayist.

== Writing career ==
Smith's writing deals primarily with the theme of redemption: coming back from a dark place into light and trying to find a way home.

Her first novel, The Frozen Lady, is a historical novel dealing with the birth of Alaska, tracing the intertwining lives of an Eskimo man and a white woman.

Her magazine work includes a 1987 interview with James Michener and his family, and a 1987 interview with Susan Butcher, famed champion of the Alaskan Iditarod dog sled race.

Her first play, BEAST, won the 1990 Stanley Drama Award and the 1991 Albert and Mildred Panowski/Shiras Institute playwriting award, where Dr. James Panowski called it “easily the best play writing award winner we’ve selected since the contest began back in 1974.” BEAST’s first professional production was Tampa Players, in 1993. A second play, Killing Mother, was produced in 1992.

Smith's first essay, “From the Heart,” done as a surprise anniversary present for her husband, Fred, aired on National Public Radio, which was the start of a 10-year career at NPR writing essays for "Weekend Edition-Sunday."

Her 1992 teleplay, Different, was accepted at the National Playwrights Conference, Eugene O’Neill Theater Center in Waterford, CN. Different was later a finalist for a Pen Center USA West award, a nominee for a Hollywood Media Access Award, and was broadcast in 1999 in a Lifetime Television production starring Lynn Redgrave and Annabeth Gish.

Smith has written three other teleplays, all of which have been produced and have aired: Dying to be Perfect: the Ellen Hart Pena Story, on ABC, starring Crystal Bernard and Esai Morales); Another Woman’s Husband, also by Lifetime Television, starring Lisa Rinna and Gail O'Grady; and Love Lessons, on CBS, starring Patty Duke.

Her first thriller, The Timer Game, was published in 2008 and has been translated into several languages and is available in 12 countries. Along with co-creator and director Kai Soremekun, in 2007 she produced a series of twenty-two webisodes—dramas about a minute in length—that introduce The Timer Game five years before the book opens. The last webisode ends in a cliff-hanger that's paid off in the novel.

Her second thriller in the series, Out at Night, dealing with the issue of terrorism and genetically modified crops, was published in the US in March, 2009 by St. Martin's Minotaur and in the UK in May, 2009 by Harper Perennial. Out at Night is also available in other languages. Smith is at work on the next Grace Descanso thriller.

Her play Separation Rapid was commissioned by Chenango River Theatre in Greene, New York, Bill Lelbach, directing, and produced in 2012, with Kate Hamill in the role of Bessie Hyde.

== Personal life ==
Susan is married. She lives and works in Southern California.

== Facebook incident ==
In February 2011, Smith published an article on Salon.com, detailing her distress over a fraudulent and libelous Facebook page created in her name as a prank, and Facebook's reported refusal to take steps to resolve the matter.

== Works ==
- The Frozen Lady, 1982
- BEAST, 1992
- Killing Mother, 1993
- Dying to be Perfect: the Ellen Hart Pena Story, 1996
- Different, 1999
- Another Woman’s Husband, 1999
- Love Lessons, 2000
- Essays, National Public Radio, Weekend Edition-Sunday, 1991–2001
- 2012 Separation Rapid, produced, Chenango River Theater, Greene, New York, Bill Lelbach, directing, Kate Hamill, lead actor
- Word/Smith by Susan Arnout Smith, a free, monthly, electronic newspaper delivered to subscribers, every issue with multiple voices focusing on a specific topic. The theme of the newsletter, which ran during Covid from January 2020 to December 2022, was always about Light. Issues included diverse in-depth perspectives on a wide-ranging subjects including: Pilgrimage, Joy, Space, Mystery, Miracles. It is still free, your information never sold or shared, and available by subscription (which gives one complete access to the three years), on www.susanarnoutsmith.com
