= Still Forms on Foxfield =

1980 novel by Joan Slonczewski

- First edition (publ. Del Rey Books); Cover art by H. R. Van Dongen
- Author: Joan Slonczewski
- Language: English
- Publication date: 1980

Still Forms on Foxfield is a 1980 science fiction novel by American writer Joan Slonczewski. It was their first novel.

== Plot summary ==
The planet Foxfield is inhabited by people who left Earth on the brink of a nuclear war. After a century on their new planet, the inhabitants are contacted by people from Earth. Foxfielders are members of the Society of Friends, or Quakers, who have kept their faith while dwelling on a rather inhospitable planet. The Foxfielders' survival was made possible only by the natives of Foxfield, the Commensals, who were initially assumed to be hostile, but whose chemical talents have made human survival on Foxfield possible. When Commensals finish their life span, they go to the jungle, to a mysterious structure known as the Dwelling, to add their body and mind to the collective consciousness, the One.

Allison Thorne, a widow with a twelve-year-old son, David, who is in charge of the main settlement's technical center, is the one contacted by the Earth dwellers, United Nations Interplanetary. The UNI, who have been observing Foxfield secretly for years, are welcomed by the Foxfielders, who learn the history of the past century — that the war occurred, but was not as bad as thought — and begin to catch up on technology.

Friction soon begins to develop between Foxfielders and the newcomers. Credometers, worn like wristwatches, are accepted by Foxfielders without realizing that doing so makes them irrevocably part of UNI. Aspects of UNI culture, such as majority voting and violent space games in which people are killed, shock the Foxfielders. The UNI representatives have difficulty understanding the Foxfielders, which is not surprising given that religion in the UNI is reduced to "preservation societies". Foxfielders fear they will soon be lost in the UNI masses—while the contact affects UNI culture as well.

Matters are brought to a head when the One announces that it intends to destroy the UNI ship, and reveals that it has already destroyed satellites. The Foxfielders mount an expedition to the Dwelling with Alison, her boyfriend, Seth Connaught, and a UNI citizen. They are able to persuade the One not to follow through on its plan.

A final chapter, set some months later, shows Foxfield slowly integrating into UNI society while insisting on maintaining its own identity.

== Reception ==
Greg Costikyan reviewed Still Forms on Foxfield in Ares Magazine #3 and commented that "Still Forms is a story of courageous men and women attempting to deal with a crisis not of their own making, and it makes for enjoyable reading."

James Nicoll, writing in 2015, noted that — aside from assumptions about the inevitability of nuclear war and the long-term historical relevance of Richard Nixon — the book "has not aged anywhere nearly as badly as it could have", particularly commending Slonczewski's depiction of "a world with ubiquitous networked communication", at which she "succeeds to a greater degree than many of her contemporaries did."

== Reviews ==
- Review by Dean R. Lambe (1980) in Science Fiction Review, August 1980
- Review by Jeff Frane (1981) in Locus, #241 February 1981
- Review by Susan Wood (1981) in Starship, Spring 1981
- Review by Tom Easton (1989) in Analog Science Fiction and Fact, September 1989
