= Katonah Village Historic District =

Historic district in New York, United States

- U.S. National Register of Historic Places
- U.S. Historic district
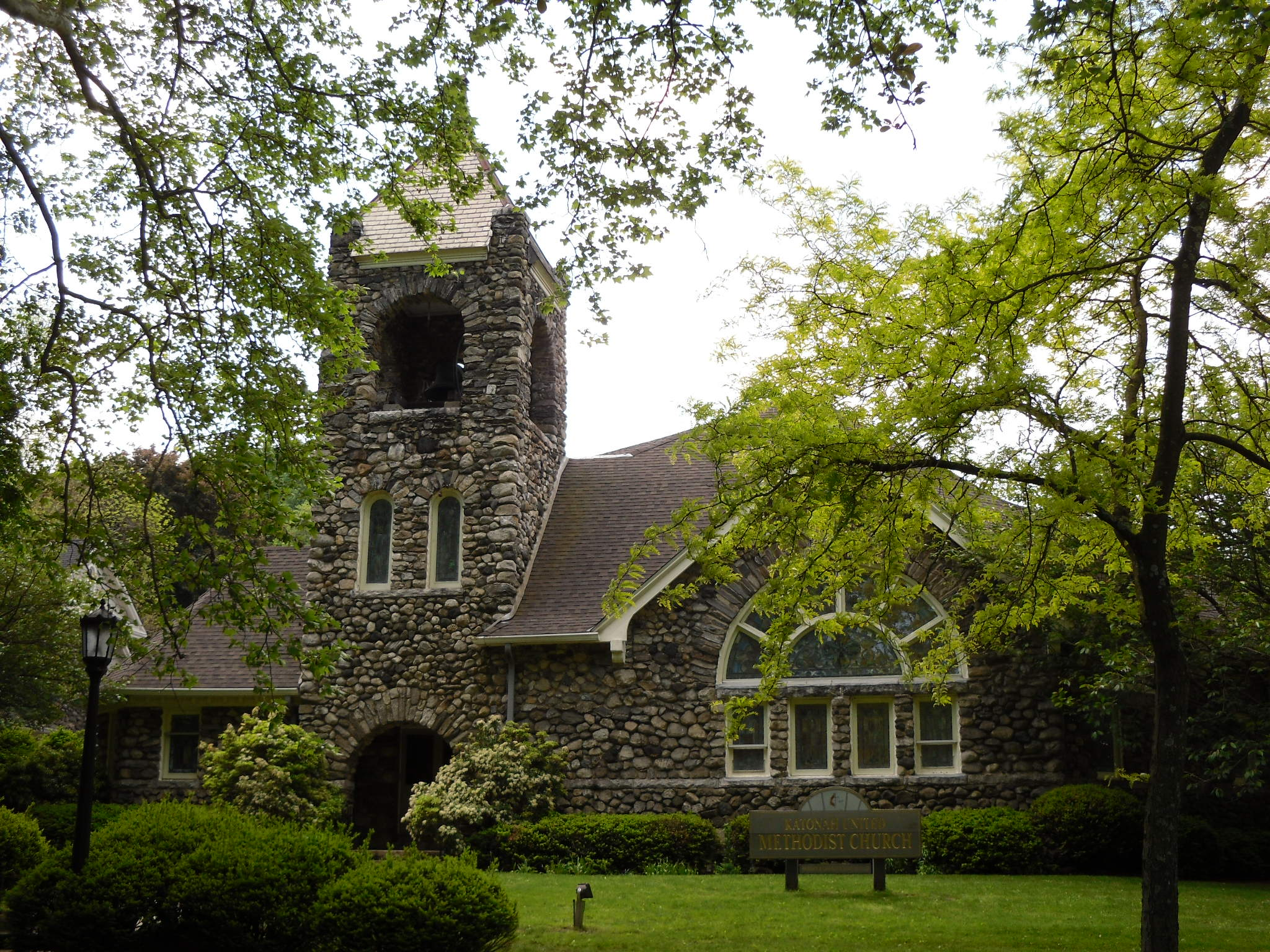
- Katonah Methodist Church in the Historic District

- Location within New York Location within the United States
- Location: Parkway, Valleyedge, Edgemont and Bedford Rds., Katonah, New York
- Coordinates: 41°15′20″N 73°41′2″W
- Area: 18 acres (7.3 ha)
- Built: 1895
- Architect: Olmsted, B.S.; Olmsted, G.S.
- Architectural style: Late Victorian, Queen Anne
- NRHP reference No.: 83001830
- Added to NRHP: September 15, 1983

Katonah Village Historic District is a national historic district located at Katonah, Westchester County, New York. The district contains 38 contributing buildings developed between 1895 and 1928 in "New Katonah." It is primarily residential, but also includes three churches and two combination residential-professional office space buildings. The street pattern was designed by the Olmsted Brothers and there are representative buildings in the Queen Anne and Late Victorian styles.

It was added to the National Register of Historic Places in 1983.

== See also ==
- National Register of Historic Places listings in northern Westchester County, New York
