= Blood!: The Life and Future Times of Jack the Ripper =

Box set by Robert Bloch and Harlan Ellison
- Released: 1977
- Genre: Spoken word
- Label: Alternate World Recordings

Blood! The Life And Future Times Of Jack The Ripper was a set of two record albums that was issued in 1977. The first record has American writer Robert Bloch reading his short stories, "Yours Truly, Jack the Ripper" and "A Toy for Juliette". The first was published in Weird Tales in 1943; the second appeared in Harlan Ellison's science fiction anthology, Dangerous Visions. On the second record is speculative fiction author Harlan Ellison reading his short story, "The Prowler in the City at the Edge of the World".

This album set was nominated for a Hugo Award for Best Dramatic Presentation in 1978. The winner in the same category was the film Star Wars.
