= Aye, and Gomorrah, and Other Stories =

Aye, and Gomorrah
- Cover from the first edition
- Author: Samuel R. Delany
- Language: English
- Genre: Science fiction, fantasy
- Publisher: Vintage
- Publication date: 2003
- Publication place: United States
- Media type: Print (paperback)
- Pages: 383
- ISBN: 0-375-70671-2
- OCLC: 51304318
- Dewey Decimal: 813/.54 21
- LC Class: PS3554.E437 A6 2003

Aye, and Gomorrah, and other stories is a collection of stories by American writer Samuel R. Delany, published by Vintage Books in 2003. The book is closely based on an earlier collection, Driftglass, which first appeared in 1971. The ten stories contained in Driftglass are all contained in Aye, and Gomorrah, along with five other stories ("Omegahelm", "Among the Blobs", "Tapestry", "Prismatica", "Ruins"). The stories consist of ten science fiction stories, in the order the writer wrote them, followed by five fantasies, also in chronological order.

When the 1971 collection was put together, Delany and his editor gave serious thought to calling it Aye, and Gomorrah, instead of Driftglass. The title story had won Delany his third Nebula Award—this one for best short story of 1967—so that using it to title his first collection would have seemed a reasonable choice. But New American Library, the initial contractors for the book (who had licensed it to the Science Fiction Book Club for a hardcover edition that would appear four months before their Signet paperback), decided they did not want a title that pushed any of the homosexual implications in the stories.

Of the Delany stories that are not included in this book, two are collaborations. One was written with Harlan Ellison: “The Power of the Nail,” contained in Ellison’s collection of collaborations Partners in Wonder. The other is a page-long prose poem, “The Dying Castles,” which appeared in a 1968 issue of the British SF magazine New Worlds (#200), as under the joint authorship of James Sallis, Samuel R. Delany, and Michael Moorcock. (Several times Delany has said that he has no memory of having written any part of it; and he has assumed the use of his name among the authors was a jape.) Another story not included here is a slightly longer piece called “The Desert of Time,” which was commissioned by Omni Magazine to accompany an illustration in the late 1980s. Also missing from this volume are the stories that are included in Delany’s four-volume Return to Nevèrÿon series, stories published after this volume was released in 2003, and several other stories.

== Contents ==
The following stories appear in the book:

- "The Star Pit"
- "Corona"
- "Aye, and Gomorrah…"
- "Driftglass"
- "We, in Some Strange Power’s Employ, Move on a Rigorous Line" (this story is written in the style of and as a homage to Roger Zelazny, who also appears in it as a character)
- "Cage of Brass"
- "High Weir"
- "Time Considered as a Helix of Semi-Precious Stones"
- "Omegahelm"
- "Among the Blobs"
- "Tapestry"
- "Prismatica"
- "Ruins"
- "Dog in a Fisherman’s Net"
- "Night and the Loves of Joe Dicostanzo"
- Afterword: Of Doubts and Dreams
