= Dollhouse (disambiguation) =

A dollhouse is a miniature replica of a house.

Dollhouse, Doll House, doll house or doll's house may also refer to:

== Media ==
=== Television ===
- Dollhouse (TV series), a series created by Joss Whedon
- The Dollhouse (Yellowjackets), an episode of the American TV series Yellowjackets
- "Dollhouse", a season 5 episode of Law & Order: Criminal Intent

=== Music ===
- "Doll House", a 1960 single by Donnie Brooks
- "Dollhouse", a song by Bruce Springsteen on the 1998 box-set Tracks
- "Dollhouse" (Priscilla Renea song), a 2009 song by Priscilla Renea
- Dollhouse (EP), 2014 Melanie Martinez EP
  - "Dollhouse" (Melanie Martinez song), title song from the EP

=== Literature ===
- A Doll's House, an 1879 play by Henrik Ibsen also known as A Dollhouse or A Doll House
- "The Doll's House" (short story), a 1922 short story by Katherine Mansfield
- The Doll's House, a 1947 children's book by Rumer Godden
- "The Doll-House", a 1967 short story by James Cross
- The Sandman: The Doll's House, the second volume of the comic book series The Sandman written by Neil Gaiman and published in 1990
- Dollhouse, a DC Comics supervillain
- Dollhouse (book), a 2011 book by Kim Kardashian, Khloe Kardashian and Kourtney Kardashian
- The Doll's House (novel), a 2013 novel by Tania Carver

=== Other ===
- "The Doll House" (episode), a dramatic reading of Dark Shadows
- Dollhouse (2012 film), a film directed by Kirsten Sheridan
- The Dollhouse, American professional wrestling stable from Total Nonstop Action Wrestling
- The Jerma985 Dollhouse, a livestreamed event

== Places ==
- The Doll House (restaurant), a former restaurant in Pasadena, California
- Benedict Doll House, a private house in Coldwater, Michigan

== See also ==
- A Doll's House (disambiguation)
