= A Doll's House (disambiguation) =

A Doll's House is a play by Henrik Ibsen.

A Doll's House, Doll's House, or The Doll's House may also refer to:

== Film and TV ==
- A Doll's House, a 1911 short silent film starring Marie Eline, William Russell and Marguerite Snow
- A Doll's House (1917 film), an adaptation directed by Joe De Grasse
- A Doll's House (1918 film), an adaptation directed by Maurice Tourneur
- A Doll's House (1922 film), an adaptation directed by Charles Bryant and starring his wife Alla Nazimova
- A Doll's House (1943 film), an adaptation directed by Ernesto Arancibia
- A Doll's House (1956 film), a Swedish film adaptation directed by Anders Henrikson
- A Doll's House (1959 film), a television film adaptation directed by George Schaefer
- A Doll's House (1973 Garland film), an adaptation directed by Patrick Garland
- A Doll's House (1973 Losey film), an adaptation directed by Joseph Losey
- A Doll's House (1992 film), a television adaptation directed by David Thacker
- Doll's House (TV series), a 2007–2009 Bangladeshi soap opera

== Literature ==
- The Doll's House and Other Stories (aka Art in Nature), a 1978 short story collection by Tove Jansson
- The Doll's House (novel), 2013, by Tania Carver
- "The Doll's House" (short story), by Katherine Mansfield
- The Doll's House, a 1947 children's book by Rumer Godden
- The Sandman: The Doll's House, the second volume of the comic book series The Sandman

== Other uses ==
- A Doll's House, working title of the 1968 Beatles album The Beatles ("the White Album")

== See also ==
- The House of Dolls, a 1955 novella by Yehiel De-Nur (as Ka-Tzetnik 135633)
- Dollhouse (disambiguation)
