= Auto-da-fé (disambiguation) =

An auto-da-fé (or auto da fé or auto de fe) is a Roman Catholic church ritual which became associated with the Spanish Inquisition.

Auto-da-fé may also refer to:

- Auto Da Fe, rock climbing route at Mount Arapiles in Victoria, Australia

== Literature ==
- Auto-da-Fé (novel), English-language title of Elias Canetti's 1935 novel Die Blendung
- Auto-da-Fé (play), 1941 play by Tennessee Williams
- "Auto-da-Fé" (short story), by Roger Zelazny, published 1967 in Dangerous Visions

== Music ==
- Auto Da Fé (band), Irish new wave musical group formed in the Netherlands
- Auto Da Fé, an album by SPK
- "Auto-da-Fé", a song from the operetta Candide

== See also ==
- Auto de Fay, a 2002 autobiography by Fay Weldon
