= Jones Parry =

Jones Parry or Jones-Parry may refer to:

- Emyr Jones Parry (born 1947), British diplomat
- Hugh Jones Parry (1916–1997), British-born American writer and sociologist
- Sir Love Jones-Parry, 1st Baronet (1832-1891), Welsh politician and a founder of Patagonia
- Love Jones-Parry (British Army officer) (1781-1853), British army officer and High Sheriff of Anglesey
- Tristram Jones-Parry, British educationalist

== See also ==
- Parry Jones
