= Hugo Award for Best Dramatic Presentation =

Annual award for science fiction or fantasy

- Awarded for: The best dramatized production devoted primarily to science fiction or fantasy
- Presented by: World Science Fiction Society
- First award: 1958
- Most recent winner: Sinners (Long Form); Murderbot: "All Systems Red" (Short Form)
- Website: thehugoawards.org

The Hugo Award for Best Dramatic Presentation is given each year for theatrical films, television episodes, or other dramatized works related to science fiction or fantasy released in the previous calendar year. Originally the award covered both works of film and of television but since 2003, it has been split into two categories: Best Dramatic Presentation (Long Form) and Best Dramatic Presentation (Short Form). The Dramatic Presentation Awards are part of the broader Hugo Awards, which are given every year by the World Science Fiction Society for the best science fiction or fantasy works and achievements of the previous year. The awards are named after Hugo Gernsback, the founder of the first science fiction magazine, Amazing Stories, and was once officially known as the Science Fiction Achievement Award. The award has been described as "a fine showcase for speculative fiction".

== History ==
The award was first presented in 1958, and with the exceptions of 1964 and 1966 was given annually through 2002 when it was retired in favor of the newly created Dramatic Presentation (Long Form) and Dramatic Presentation (Short Form) categories, which divided the category depending on whether the work was longer or shorter than 90 minutes. In the 1964 and 1966 awards there were insufficient nominations made to support the category. Prior to 1971, the category was defined as including works from "radio, television, stage or screen", and thereafter was expanded to "any medium of dramatized science fiction or fantasy", resulting in the nomination of recorded songs and other works. In addition to the regular Hugo awards, between 1996 and 2025, Retrospective Hugo Awards or "Retro-Hugos" were available for works published 50, 75, or 100 years prior. Retro-Hugos could only be awarded for years after 1939 in which no awards were originally given. Retro-Hugo awards were awarded for 1939, 1941, 1943–1946, 1951, and 1954; the 1946 and 1951 awards were for the Best Dramatic Presentation category while the 1939, 1945, and 1954 awards were for the Short Form category. There were insufficient nominations to support an award in the Long Form category for those years. The 1941 and 1944 awards were for both Long and Short Form.

Hugo Award nominees and winners are chosen by supporting or attending members of the annual World Science Fiction Convention (Worldcon) and the presentation evening constitutes its central event. The selection process is defined in the World Science Fiction Society Constitution as instant-runoff voting with six finalists, except in the case of a tie. The works on the ballot are the six most-nominated by members that year, with no limit on the number of works that can be nominated. The 1958 awards did not include any recognition of runner-up magazines, but since 1959 all six candidates were recorded. Initial nominations are made by members in January through March, while voting on the ballot of six finalists is performed roughly in April through July, subject to change depending on when that year's Worldcon is held. Prior to 2017, the final ballot was five works; it was changed that year to six, with each initial nominator limited to five nominations, and no more than two works per series allowed on the final ballot. Worldcons are generally held near the start of September, and are held in a different city around the world each year. Members are permitted to vote "no award", if they feel that none of the finalists is deserving of the award that year, and in the case that "no award" takes the majority the Hugo is not given in that category. This has happened in the Dramatic Presentation category four times, in 1959, 1963, 1971, and 1977.

The award is typically for television and film presentations, but occasionally rewards works in other formats: in 1970 it was awarded to news coverage of the Apollo 11 Moon landing, while in 1971 a concept album and a comedy album were finalists. Another comedy album was a finalist the following year, and a slideshow was a finalist in 1976. A radio play was a finalist in 1979, and all of the 1939 Retro Hugo awards were for radio plays. In 2004, an acceptance speech from the 2003 MTV Movie Awards won the award, while in 2006, a skit from the opening of the previous year's award ceremony (pretending to be for the "Victor Hugo Award") was a finalist. An audiobook was a finalist in 2009, another acceptance speech was a finalist in 2012, a concept album was a finalist in 2017, and a song was a finalist in 2018.

During the 76 nomination years, 43 awards for Best Dramatic Presentation, 26 awards each for Short Form and Long Form, and 11 Retro-Hugo awards have been given. The individual franchises with the most awards are Doctor Who/Whoniverse with 6 Short Form awards out of 40 final ballot nominations; (Note: 37 ballot nominations for the main show; plus Torchwood: "Captain Jack Harkness" in 2008; and docudrama An Adventure in Space and Time and parody spoof The Five(ish) Doctors Reboot, both in 2014. All Short Form winners came from five of the first six series of the 2005 Doctor Who revival series and the 2008–2010 specials.) Star Trek with 4 Best Dramatic Presentation awards out of 21 nominations, as well as one Short Form award out of 9 nominations, and a Long Form nomination; Star Wars with 3 Best Dramatic Presentation awards out of 3 nominations as well as 5 Long Form and 5 Short Form nominations.

Other shows or series with multiple awards or nominations include The Good Place with 4 wins out of 6 Short Form nominations, The Twilight Zone with 3 Best Dramatic Presentation awards out of 4 nominations, Game of Thrones with 3 wins out of a Long Form and 5 Short Form nominations, The Expanse with 3 wins out of 6 Short Form nominations, and Babylon 5 with 2 wins out of 4 nominations, the Marvel Cinematic Universe with 1 win out of 15 Long Form and 4 Short Form nominations, Buffy the Vampire Slayer with 1 out of 6, Battlestar Galactica (2004) with 1 of 5, and Harry Potter with no awards after 7 nominations. The members of the hip hop group Clipping are the only musical artists to have earned two nominations for their works, first for their 2016 album Splendor & Misery and then for their 2017 song "The Deep".

== Winners and finalists ==
In the following tables, the years correspond to the date of the ceremony, rather than when the work was first published. Entries with a yellow background and an asterisk (*) next to the work's name have won the award; those with a white background are the finalists on the short-list. Entries with a gray background and a plus sign (+) mark a year when "no award" was selected as the winner. In the case of television presentations, the award is generally for a particular episode rather than for a program as a whole; however, sometimes, as in the case of The Twilight Zone, it was given for the series' body of work that year rather than for any particular episode.

=== 1958–2002 ===
* Winners and joint winners
+ No winner selected

Best dramatic presentation winners and finalists
Year	Work	Creator(s)	Publisher(s)	Ref.
1958	The Incredible Shrinking Man*	Jack Arnold (director), Richard Matheson (screenplay, story)	Universal Studios	
1959	(no award)+			
1959	The 7th Voyage of Sinbad	Nathan Juran (director), Ken Kolb (screenplay), Ray Harryhausen (story)	Morningside Movies/Columbia Pictures	
1959	Dracula	Terence Fisher (director), Jimmy Sangster (screenplay), Bram Stoker (original novel)	Hammer Film Productions	
1959	The Fly	Kurt Neumann (director), James Clavell (screenplay), George Langelaan (story)	20th Century Fox	
1960	The Twilight Zone*	Rod Serling (creator, screenplay)	CBS	
1960	Men into Space	(multiple directors and writers)	CBS	
1960	Murder and the Android	Alex Segal (director), Alfred Bester (original story)	NBC	
1960	The Turn of the Screw	John Frankenheimer (director), James Costigan (screenplay), Henry James (original story)	NBC	
1960	The World, the Flesh and the Devil	Ranald MacDougall (director, screenplay), Ferdinand Reyher (story), M. P. Shiel (original novel)	HarBel/Metro-Goldwyn-Mayer	
1961	The Twilight Zone*	Rod Serling (creator, screenplay)	CBS	
1961	The Time Machine	George Pal (director), David Duncan (screenplay), H. G. Wells (original novel)	Galaxy Films/Metro-Goldwyn-Mayer	
1961	Village of the Damned	Wolf Rilla (director, screenplay), Stirling Silliphant (screenplay), Ronald Kinnoch (screenplay)	Metro-Goldwyn-Mayer	
1962	The Twilight Zone*	Rod Serling (creator, screenplay)	CBS	
1962	Thriller	(multiple directors and writers)	NBC	
1962	The United States Steel Hour: "The Two Worlds of Charlie Gordon"	James Yaffe (screenplay), Daniel Keyes (original story)	CBS	
1962	Village of the Damned	Wolf Rilla (director, screenplay), Stirling Silliphant (screenplay), Ronald Kinnoch (screenplay)	Metro-Goldwyn-Mayer	
1962	The Fabulous World of Jules Verne	Karel Zeman (director, screenplay), František Hrubín (screenplay), Jules Verne (original novel)	Warner Bros.	
1963	(no award)+			
1963	The Twilight Zone	Rod Serling (creator, screenplay)	CBS	
1963	Last Year at Marienbad	Alain Resnais (director, screenplay), Alain Robbe-Grillet (screenplay), Adolfo Bioy Casares (original novel)	Argos Films	
1963	The Day the Earth Caught Fire	Val Guest (director, screenplay), Wolf Mankowitz (screenplay)	British Lion Films/Pax	
1963	Night of the Eagle	Sidney Hayers (director), Charles Beaumont (screenplay), Richard Matheson (screenplay), George Baxt (screenplay), Fritz Leiber (original novel)	Anglo-Amalgamated/Independent Artists	
1965	Dr. Strangelove*	Stanley Kubrick (director, screenplay), Terry Southern (screenplay), Peter George (screenplay, original novel)	Hawk Films/Columbia Pictures	
1965	7 Faces of Dr. Lao	George Pal (director), Charles Beaumont (screenplay), Charles G. Finney (original novel)	Metro-Goldwyn-Mayer	
1967	Star Trek: "The Menagerie"*	Marc Daniels (director), Gene Roddenberry (screenplay)	Desilu Productions	
1967	Star Trek: "The Corbomite Maneuver"	Joseph Sargent (director), Jerry Sohl (screenplay)	Desilu Productions	
1967	Star Trek: "The Naked Time"	Marc Daniels (director), John D. F. Black (screenplay)	Desilu Productions	
1967	Fahrenheit 451	François Truffaut (director, screenplay), Jean-Louis Richard (screenplay), Helen G. Scott (screenplay), Ray Bradbury (original novel)	Anglo Enterprises/Vineyard	
1967	Fantastic Voyage	Richard Fleischer (director), Harry Kleiner (screenplay), David Duncan (screenplay), Jerome Bixby (story), Otto Klement (story)	20th Century Fox	
1968	Star Trek: "The City on the Edge of Forever"*	Joseph Pevney (director), Harlan Ellison (screenplay)	Desilu Productions	
1968	Star Trek: "Amok Time"	Joseph Pevney (director), Theodore Sturgeon (screenplay)	Desilu Productions	
1968	Star Trek: "Mirror, Mirror"	Marc Daniels (director), Jerome Bixby (screenplay)	Desilu Productions	
1968	Star Trek: "The Doomsday Machine"	Marc Daniels (director), Norman Spinrad (screenplay)	Desilu Productions	
1968	Star Trek: "The Trouble with Tribbles"	Joseph Pevney (director), David Gerrold (screenplay)	Desilu Productions	
1969	2001: A Space Odyssey*	Stanley Kubrick (director, screenplay), Arthur C. Clarke (screenplay, original story)	Metro-Goldwyn-Mayer	
1969	The Prisoner: "Fall Out"	Patrick McGoohan (director, screenplay)	Everyman/ITC Entertainment	
1969	Charly	Ralph Nelson (director), Stirling Silliphant (screenplay), Daniel Keyes (original story)	ABC Pictures/Selmer	
1969	Rosemary's Baby	Roman Polanski (director, screenplay), Ira Levin (original novel)	Paramount Pictures	
1969	Yellow Submarine	George Dunning (director), Al Brodax (screenplay), Roger McGough (screenplay), Jack Mendelsohn (screenplay), Lee Minoff (screenplay), Erich Segal (screenplay)	Apple Corps/Hearst/King Features Syndicate	
1970	News coverage of Apollo 11*	Multiple sources	Multiple publishers, NASA	
1970	The Bed Sitting Room	Richard Lester (director), John Antrobus (screenplay), Charles Wood (screenplay), John Antrobus (original play), Spike Milligan (original play)	Oscar Lewenstein Productions	
1970	The Illustrated Man	Jack Smight (director), Howard B. Kreitsek (screenplay), Ray Bradbury (original story collection)	SKM	
1970	The Immortal	Allen Baron (director), Joseph Sargent (director), Lou Morheim (screenplay), Robert Specht (screenplay), James Gunn (original novel)	Paramount Pictures	
1970	Marooned	John Sturges (director), Mayo Simon (screenplay), Martin Caidin (original novel)	Columbia Pictures	
1971	(no award)+			
1971	Blows Against the Empire	Paul Kantner (lyrics, music)	RCA Records	
1971	Colossus: The Forbin Project	Joseph Sargent (director), James Bridges (screenplay), D. F. Jones (original novel)	Universal Studios	
1971	Don't Crush That Dwarf, Hand Me the Pliers	The Firesign Theatre (screenplay, performance)	Columbia Records	
1971	Hauser's Memory	Boris Sagal (director), Adrian Spies (screenplay), Curt Siodmak (original novel)	Universal Studios	
1971	No Blade of Grass	Cornel Wilde (director), Sean Forestal (screenplay), Jefferson Pascal (screenplay), John Christopher (original novel)	Theodora/Metro-Goldwyn-Mayer	
1972	A Clockwork Orange*	Stanley Kubrick (director, screenplay), Anthony Burgess (original novel)	Hawk Films/Polaris/Warner Bros.	
1972	The Andromeda Strain	Robert Wise (director), Nelson Gidding (screenplay), Michael Crichton (original novel)	Universal Studios	
1972	I Think We're All Bozos on This Bus	The Firesign Theatre (screenplay, performance)	Columbia Records	
1972	The Name of the Game: "L.A. 2017"	Steven Spielberg (director), Philip Wylie (screenplay)	Universal Studios/NBC	
1972	THX 1138	George Lucas (director, screenplay, story), Walter Murch (screenplay)	Warner Bros./American Zoetrope	
1973	Slaughterhouse-Five*	George Roy Hill (director), Stephen Geller (screenplay), Kurt Vonnegut (original novel)	Universal Studios	
1973	Between Time and Timbuktu	Fred Barzyk (director), Kurt Vonnegut (screenplay, story)	NET Playhouse/Public Broadcasting Service	
1973	The People	John Korty (director), James M. Miller (screenplay), Zenna Henderson (original stories)	American Zoetrope/ABC	
1973	Silent Running	Douglas Trumbull (director), Deric Washburn (screenplay), Michael Cimino (screenplay), Steven Bochco (screenplay)	Universal Studios	
1974	Sleeper*	Woody Allen (director, screenplay), Marshall Brickman (screenplay)	Rollins-Joffe/Metro-Goldwyn-Mayer/United Artists	
1974	Genesis II	John Llewellyn Moxey (director), Gene Roddenberry (screenplay)	Norway/Warner Bros.	
1974	The Six Million Dollar Man	Richard Irving (director), Tom Greene (screenplay), Howard Rodman (screenplay), Martin Caidin (original novel)	Universal Studios	
1974	Soylent Green	Richard Fleischer (director), Stanley R. Greenberg (screenplay), Harry Harrison (original novel)	Metro-Goldwyn-Mayer	
1974	Westworld	Michael Crichton (director, screenplay)	Metro-Goldwyn-Mayer	
1975	Young Frankenstein*	Mel Brooks (director, screenplay, story), Gene Wilder (screenplay, story), Mary Shelley (original novel)	20th Century Fox	
1975	Flesh Gordon	Michael Benveniste (director, screenplay), Howard Ziehm (director)	Graffiti Productions	
1975	Phantom of the Paradise	Brian De Palma (director, screenplay)	Harbor/20th Century Fox	
1975	The Questor Tapes	Richard A. Colla (director), Gene L. Coon (screenplay), Gene Roddenberry (screenplay, story)	Universal Studios	
1975	Zardoz	John Boorman (director, screenplay)	20th Century Fox	
1976	A Boy and His Dog*	L. Q. Jones (director, screenplay), Wayne Cruseturner (screenplay), Harlan Ellison (original story)	LQ/JAF	
1976	Dark Star	John Carpenter (director, screenplay), Dan O'Bannon (screenplay)	USC	
1976	Monty Python and the Holy Grail	Terry Gilliam (director, screenplay), Terry Jones (director, screenplay), Graham Chapman (screenplay), John Cleese (screenplay), Eric Idle (screenplay), Michael Palin (screenplay)	Python (Monty) Pictures	
1976	Rollerball	Norman Jewison (director), William Harrison (screenplay, original story)	Algonquin/United Artists	
1976	The Capture	Robert Asprin (writer), Phil Foglio (artist)	Boojums Press	
1977	(no award)+			
1977	Carrie	Brian De Palma (director), Lawrence D. Cohen (screenplay), Stephen King (original novel)	Redbank/United Artists	
1977	Logan's Run	Michael Anderson (director), David Zelag Goodman (screenplay), William F. Nolan (original novel), George Clayton Johnson (original novel)	Metro-Goldwyn-Mayer	
1977	The Man Who Fell to Earth	Nicolas Roeg (director), Paul Mayersberg (screenplay), Walter Tevis (original novel)	British Lion Films	
1977	Futureworld	Richard T. Heffron (director), George Schenk (screenplay), Mayo Simon (screenplay)	American International Pictures	
1978	Star Wars*	George Lucas (director, screenplay)	Lucasfilm	
1978	Close Encounters of the Third Kind	Steven Spielberg (director, screenplay)	Columbia Pictures/EMI Films	
1978	Blood!: The Life and Future Times of Jack the Ripper	Shelley Torgeson (director), Robert Bloch (script), Harlan Ellison (script), Roy Torgeson (producer)	Alternate Worlds Recordings	
1978	Wizards	Ralph Bakshi (director, screenplay)	20th Century Fox	
1978	The Hobbit	Jules Bass (director), Arthur Rankin, Jr. (director), Romeo Muller (screenplay), J. R. R. Tolkien (original novel)	Rankin/Bass	
1979	Superman*	Richard Donner (director), Mario Puzo (screenplay), David Newman (screenplay), Leslie Newman (screenplay), Robert Benton (screenplay), Mario Puzo (story), Jerry Siegel (original character), Joe Shuster (original character)	Alexander Salkind	
1979	Invasion of the Body Snatchers	Philip Kaufmann (director), W. D. Richter (screenplay), Jack Finney (original novel)	Solofilm/United Artists	
1979	The Lord of the Rings	Ralph Bakshi (director), Peter S. Beagle (screenplay), Chris Conkling (screenplay), J. R. R. Tolkien (original novels)	Fantasy Films	
1979	Watership Down	Martin Rosen (director, screenplay), Richard Adams (original novel)	Nepenthe Productions	
1979	The Hitchhiker's Guide to the Galaxy	Douglas Adams (script), Geoffrey Perkins (producer)	BBC Radio 4	
1980	Alien*	Ridley Scott (director), Dan O'Bannon (screenplay, story), Ronald Shusett (story)	20th Century Fox	
1980	The Black Hole	Gary Nelson (director), Jeb Rosebrook (screenplay, story), Gerry Day (screenplay), Bob Barbash (story), Richard H. Landau (story)	The Walt Disney Company	
1980	The Muppet Movie	James Frawley (director), Jack Burns (screenplay), Jerry Juhl (screenplay)	The Jim Henson Company/ITC Entertainment	
1980	Star Trek: The Motion Picture	Robert Wise (director), Harold Livingstonn (screenplay), Alan Dean Foster (story), Gene Roddenberry (story)	Century/Paramount Pictures	
1980	Time After Time	Nicholas Meyer (director, screenplay), Karl Alexander (story, original novel), Steve Hayes (story)	Warner Bros.	
1981	The Empire Strikes Back*	Irvin Kershner (director), Leigh Brackett (screenplay), Lawrence Kasdan (screenplay), George Lucas (story)	Lucasfilm	
1981	Cosmos: A Personal Voyage	Carl Sagan (director, screenplay), Ann Druyan (director, screenplay)	KCET/Public Broadcasting Service	
1981	Flash Gordon	Mike Hodges (director), Lorenzo Semple, Jr. (screenplay), Michael Allin (adaptation), Alex Raymond (original comic strip)	20th Century Fox/De Laurentiis	
1981	The Lathe of Heaven	Fred Barzyk (director), David R. Loxton (director), Diane English (screenplay), Roger Swaybill (screenplay), Ursula K. Le Guin (original novel)	WNET/Public Broadcasting Service	
1981	The Martian Chronicles	Michael Anderson (director), Richard Matheson (screenplay), Ray Bradbury (original stories)	BBC/NBC	
1982	Raiders of the Lost Ark*	Steven Spielberg (director), Lawrence Kasdan (screenplay), George Lucas (story), Philip Kaufman (story)	Lucasfilm	
1982	Dragonslayer	Matthew Robbins (director, screenplay), Hal Barwood (screenplay)	Paramount Pictures/The Walt Disney Company	
1982	Excalibur	John Boorman (director, screenplay), Rospo Pallenberg (screenplay, adaptation), Thomas Malory (original novel)	Warner Bros.	
1982	Outland	Peter Hyams (director, screenplay)	Outland/The Ladd Company	
1982	Time Bandits	Terry Gilliam (director, screenplay), Michael Palin (screenplay)	HandMade Films	
1983	Blade Runner*	Ridley Scott (director), Hampton Fancher (screenplay), David Peoples (screenplay), Philip K. Dick (original novel)	Blade Runner Partnership	
1983	The Dark Crystal	Jim Henson (director, story), Frank Oz (director), Gary Kurtz (director), David Odell (screenplay)	The Jim Henson Company/ITC Entertainment/Universal Studios	
1983	E.T. the Extra-Terrestrial	Steven Spielberg (director), Melissa Mathison (screenplay)	Amblin Entertainment/Universal Studios	
1983	Mad Max 2: The Road Warrior	George Miller (director, screenplay), Terry Hayes (screenplay), Brian Hannant (screenplay)	Kennedy Miller/Warner Bros.	
1983	Star Trek II: The Wrath of Khan	Nicholas Meyer (director, screenplay), Jack B. Sowards (screenplay, story), Harve Bennett (story), Samuel A. Peeples (story)	Paramount Pictures	
1984	Return of the Jedi*	Richard Marquand (director), Lawrence Kasdan (screenplay), George Lucas (screenplay, story)	Lucasfilm	
1984	Brainstorm	Douglas Trumbull (director), Philip Frank Messina (screenplay), Robert Stitzel (screenplay), Bruce Joel Rubin (story)	Metro-Goldwyn-Mayer	
1984	The Right Stuff	Philip Kaufmann (director, screenplay), Tom Wolfe (original novel)	The Ladd Company	
1984	Something Wicked This Way Comes	Jack Clayton (director), Ray Bradbury (screenplay, original novel)	The Bryna Company/The Walt Disney Company	
1984	WarGames	John Badham (director), Lawrence Lasker (screenplay), Walter F. Parkes (screenplay)	Metro-Goldwyn-Mayer	
1985	2010*	Peter Hyams (director, screenplay), Arthur C. Clarke (original novel)	Metro-Goldwyn-Mayer	
1985	Dune	David Lynch (director, screenplay), Frank Herbert (original novel)	De Laurentiis/Universal Studios	
1985	Ghostbusters	Ivan Reitman (director), Dan Aykroyd (screenplay), Harold Ramis (screenplay)	Black Rhino/Columbia Pictures	
1985	The Last Starfighter	Nick Castle (director), Jonathan R. Betuel (screenplay)	Lorimar Productions/Universal Studios	
1985	Star Trek III: The Search for Spock	Leonard Nimoy (director), Harve Bennett (screenplay)	Cinema Group/Paramount Pictures	
1986	Back to the Future*	Robert Zemeckis (director, screenplay), Bob Gale (screenplay)	Amblin Entertainment/Universal Studios	
1986	Brazil	Terry Gilliam (director, screenplay), Charles McKeown (screenplay), Tom Stoppard (screenplay)	Embassy/Universal Studios	
1986	Cocoon	Ron Howard (director), Tom Benedek (screenplay), David Saperstein (original novel)	20th Century Fox/Zanuck/Brown	
1986	Enemy Mine	Wolfgang Petersen (director), Edward Khmara (screenplay), Barry B. Longyear (original story)	20th Century Fox/King's Road	
1986	Ladyhawke	Richard Donner (director), Edward Khmara (screenplay, story), Michael Thomas (screenplay), Tom Mankiewicz (screenplay), David Peoples (screenplay)	20th Century Fox/Warner Bros.	
1987	Aliens*	James Cameron (director, screenplay, story), David Giler (story), Walter Hill (story)	20th Century Fox	
1987	The Fly	David Cronenberg (director, screenplay), Charles Edward Pogue (screenplay), George Langelaan (story)	Brooksfilms/20th Century Fox	
1987	Labyrinth	Jim Henson (director, story), Terry Jones (screenplay), Dennis Lee (story)	Delphi/The Jim Henson Company/Lucasfilm/TriStar Pictures	
1987	Little Shop of Horrors	Frank Oz (director), Howard Ashman (screenplay), Charles B. Griffith (original story)	The Geffen Film Company	
1987	Star Trek IV: The Voyage Home	Leonard Nimoy (director, story), Harve Bennett (screenplay, story), Steve Meerson (screenplay), Peter Krikes (screenplay), Nicholas Meyer (screenplay)	Paramount Pictures	
1988	The Princess Bride*	Rob Reiner (director), William Goldman (screenplay, original novel)	Act III/20th Century Fox	
1988	Predator	John McTiernan (director), Jim Thomas (screenplay), John Thomas (screenplay)	20th Century Fox	
1988	RoboCop	Paul Verhoeven (director), Michael Miner (screenplay), Edward Neumeier (screenplay)	Orion Pictures	
1988	Star Trek: The Next Generation: "Encounter at Farpoint"	Corey Allen (director), D. C. Fontana (screenplay), Gene Roddenberry (screenplay)	Paramount Pictures	
1988	The Witches of Eastwick	George Miller (director), Michael Cristofer (screenplay), John Updike (original novel)	Guber-Peters/Kennedy Miller/Warner Bros.	
1989	Who Framed Roger Rabbit*	Robert Zemeckis (director), Jeffrey Price (screenplay), Peter S. Seaman (screenplay), Gary K. Wolf (original novel)	Amblin Entertainment/Touchstone Pictures	
1989	Alien Nation	Graham Baker (director), Rockne S. O'Bannon (screenplay)	20th Century Fox	
1989	Beetlejuice	Tim Burton (director), Michael McDowell (screenplay, story), Warren Skaaren (screenplay), Larry Wilson (story)	Geffen/Warner Bros.	
1989	Big	Penny Marshall (director), Gary Ross (screenplay), Anne Spielberg (screenplay)	20th Century Fox	
1989	Willow	Ron Howard (director), Bob Dolman (screenplay), George Lucas (story)	Imagine/Lucasfilm/Metro-Goldwyn-Mayer	
1990	Indiana Jones and the Last Crusade*	Steven Spielberg (director), Jeffrey Boam (screenplay), George Lucas (story), Menno Meyjes (story)	Lucasfilm/Paramount Pictures	
1990	The Abyss	James Cameron (director, screenplay)	20th Century Fox/Lightstorm/Pacific Western	
1990	The Adventures of Baron Munchausen	Terry Gilliam (director, screenplay), Charles McKeown (screenplay), Rudolf Erich Raspe (original stories), Gottfried August Bürger (original stories)	Allied Artists International/Columbia Pictures/Laura/Prominent	
1990	Batman	Tim Burton (director), Sam Hamm (screenplay, story), Warren Skaaren (screenplay), Bob Kane (original characters)	Guber-Peters/PolyGram/Warner Bros.	
1990	Field of Dreams	Phil Alden Robinson (director, screenplay), W. P. Kinsella (original novel)	Gordon/Universal Studios	
1991	Edward Scissorhands*	Tim Burton (director, story), Caroline Thompson (screenplay, story)	20th Century Fox	
1991	Back to the Future Part III	Robert Zemeckis (director, story), Bob Gale (screenplay, story)	Amblin Entertainment/Universal Studios	
1991	Ghost	Jerry Zucker (director), Bruce Joel Rubin (screenplay)	Paramount Pictures	
1991	Total Recall	Paul Verhoeven (director), Ronald Shusett (screenplay, story), Dan O'Bannon (screenplay, story), Gary Goldman (screenplay), Jon Povill (story), Philip K. Dick (original story)	Carolco Pictures/TriStar Pictures	
1991	The Witches	Nicolas Roeg (director), Allan Scott (screenplay), Roald Dahl (original novel)	The Jim Henson Company/Lorimar Productions	
1992	Terminator 2: Judgment Day*	James Cameron (director, screenplay), William Wisher Jr. (screenplay)	Carolco Pictures/Lightstorm/Pacific Western	
1992	The Addams Family	Barry Sonnenfeld (director), Caroline Thompson (screenplay), Larry Wilson (screenplay), Charles Addams (original characters)	Orion Pictures/Paramount Pictures	
1992	Beauty and the Beast	Gary Trousdale (director), Kirk Wise (director), Linda Woolverton (screenplay)	Silver Screen Partners/The Walt Disney Company	
1992	The Rocketeer	Joe Johnston (director), Danny Bilson (screenplay, story), Paul De Meo (screenplay, story), William Dear (story), Dave Stevens (original comic book)	Gordon/Silver Screen Partners/Touchstone Pictures/The Walt Disney Company	
1992	Star Trek VI: The Undiscovered Country	Nicholas Meyer (director, screenplay), Denny Martin Flinn (screenplay), Leonard Nimoy (story), Lawrence Konner (story), Mark Rosenthal (story)	Paramount Pictures	
1993	Star Trek: The Next Generation: "The Inner Light"*	Peter Lauritson (director), Peter Allan Fields (screenplay), Morgan Gendel (screenplay, story)	Paramount Pictures	
1993	Aladdin	Ron Clements (director, screenplay), John Musker (director, screenplay), Ted Elliott (screenplay), Terry Rossio (screenplay)	The Walt Disney Company	
1993	Alien 3	David Fincher (director), David Giler (screenplay), Walter Hill (screenplay), Larry Ferguson (screenplay), Vincent Ward (story)	20th Century Fox/Brandywine	
1993	Batman Returns	Tim Burton (director), Daniel Waters (screenplay, story), Sam Hamm (story), Bob Kane (original characters)	PolyGram/Warner Bros.	
1993	Bram Stoker's Dracula	Francis Ford Coppola (director), James V. Hart (screenplay), Bram Stoker (original novel)	American Zoetrope/Columbia Pictures	
1994	Jurassic Park*	Steven Spielberg (director), David Koepp (screenplay), Michael Crichton (screenplay, original novel)	Universal Studios/Amblin Entertainment	
1994	Addams Family Values	Barry Sonnenfeld (director), Paul Rudnick (screenplay), Charles Addams (original characters)	Orion Pictures/Paramount Pictures	
1994	Babylon 5: "The Gathering"	Richard Compton (director), J. Michael Straczynski (screenplay)	Babylonian Productions	
1994	Groundhog Day	Harold Ramis (director, screenplay), Danny Rubin (screenplay, story)	Columbia Pictures	
1994	The Nightmare Before Christmas	Henry Selick (director), Caroline Thompson (screenplay), Michael McDowell (adaptation), Tim Burton (story)	Skellington Productions/Touchstone Pictures	
1995	Star Trek: The Next Generation: "All Good Things..."*	Winrich Kolbe (director), Ronald D. Moore (screenplay), Brannon Braga (screenplay)	Paramount Pictures	
1995	Interview with the Vampire	Neil Jordan (director), Anne Rice (screenplay, original novel)	The Geffen Film Company	
1995	The Mask	Chuck Russell (director), Mike Werb (screenplay), Michael Fallon (story), Mark Verheiden (story)	Dark Horse Entertainment/New Line Cinema	
1995	Stargate	Roland Emmerich (director, screenplay), Dean Devlin (screenplay)	Carolco Pictures/Centropolis	
1995	Star Trek Generations	David Carson (director), Ronald D. Moore (screenplay, story), Brannon Braga (screenplay, story), Rick Berman (story)	Paramount Pictures	
1996	Babylon 5: "The Coming of Shadows"*	Janet Greek (director), J. Michael Straczynski (screenplay)	Babylonian Productions	
1996	Apollo 13	Ron Howard (director), William Broyles, Jr. (screenplay), Al Reinert (screenplay), Jim Lovell (original book), Jeffrey Kluger (original book)	Imagine Entertainment/Universal Studios	
1996	Star Trek: Deep Space Nine: "The Visitor"	David Livingston (director), Michael Taylor (screenplay)	Paramount Pictures	
1996	Toy Story	John Lasseter (director, story), Joss Whedon (screenplay), Joel Cohen (screenplay), Alec Sokolow (screenplay), Andrew Stanton (screenplay, story), Pete Docter (story), Joe Ranft (story)	The Walt Disney Company/Pixar	
1996	12 Monkeys	Terry Gilliam (director), David Peoples (screenplay), Janet Peoples (screenplay), Chris Marker (original film)	Atlas/Universal Studios	
1997	Babylon 5: "Severed Dreams"*	David J. Eagle (director), J. Michael Straczynski (screenplay)	Babylonian Productions	
1997	Independence Day	Roland Emmerich (director, screenplay), Dean Devlin (screenplay)	20th Century Fox/Centropolis	
1997	Mars Attacks!	Tim Burton (director), Jonathan Gems (screenplay, story), Len Brown (original trading card game), Woody Gelman (original trading card game), Wally Wood (original trading card game), Bob Powell (original trading card game), Norman Saunders (original trading card game)	Warner Bros.	
1997	Star Trek: First Contact	Jonathan Frakes (director), Ronald D. Moore (screenplay, story), Brannon Braga (screenplay, story), Rick Berman (story)	Paramount Pictures	
1997	Star Trek: Deep Space Nine: "Trials and Tribble-ations"	Jonathan West (director), Ronald D. Moore (screenplay), René Echevarria (screenplay), Ira Steven Behr (story), Hans Beimler (story), Robert Hewitt Wolfe (story)	Paramount Pictures	
1998	Contact*	Robert Zemeckis (director), James V. Hart (screenplay), Michael Goldenberg (screenplay), Carl Sagan (story, original novel), Ann Druyan (story)	SouthSide Amusement/Warner Bros.	
1998	The Fifth Element	Luc Besson (director, screenplay, story), Robert Mark Kamen (screenplay)	Gaumont/Columbia Pictures	
1998	Gattaca	Andrew Niccol (director, screenplay)	Columbia Pictures/Jersey	
1998	Men in Black	Barry Sonnenfeld (director), Ed Solomon (screenplay, story), Lowell Cunningham (original comic)	Amblin Entertainment/Columbia Pictures/McDonald/Parkes	
1998	Starship Troopers	Paul Verhoeven (director), Edward Neumeier (screenplay), Robert A. Heinlein (original novel)	Touchstone Pictures/TriStar Pictures	
1999	The Truman Show*	Peter Weir (director), Andrew Niccol (screenplay)	Paramount Pictures	
1999	Babylon 5: "Sleeping in Light"	J. Michael Straczynski (director, screenplay)	Babylonian Productions	
1999	Dark City	Alex Proyas (director, screenplay, story), Lem Dobbs (screenplay), David S. Goyer (screenplay)	New Line Cinema	
1999	Pleasantville	Gary Ross (director, screenplay)	New Line Cinema	
1999	Star Trek: Insurrection	Jonathan Frakes (director), Michael Piller (screenplay, story), Rick Berman (story)	Paramount Pictures	
2000	Galaxy Quest*	Dean Parisot (director), David Howard (screenplay, story), Robert Gordon (screenplay)	DreamWorks	
2000	Being John Malkovich	Spike Jonze (director), Charlie Kaufman (screenplay)	Gramercy Pictures/Propaganda Films/Single Cell	
2000	The Iron Giant	Brad Bird (director, story), Tim McCanlies (screenplay), Ted Hughes (original novel)	Warner Bros.	
2000	The Matrix	Lilly Wachowski (director, screenplay), Lana Wachowski (director, screenplay)	Silver Pictures	
2000	The Sixth Sense	M. Night Shyamalan (director, screenplay)	Hollywood Pictures/Spyglass Entertainment/Kennedy/Marshall	
2001	Crouching Tiger, Hidden Dragon*	Ang Lee (director), Wang Hui-ling (screenplay), James Schamus (screenplay), Tsai Kuo Jung (screenplay), Wang Dulu (original novel)	China Film Group Corporation	
2001	Chicken Run	Peter Lord (director, story), Nick Park (director, story), Kary Kirkpatrick (screenplay), Randy Cartwright (story)	Aardman Animations/Allied Artists International/DreamWorks	
2001	Frank Herbert's Dune	John Harrison (director, screenplay), Frank Herbert (original novel)	New Amsterdam	
2001	Frequency	Gregory Hoblit (director), Toby Emmerich (screenplay)	New Line Cinema	
2001	X-Men	Bryan Singer (director, story), David Hayter (screenplay), Tom DeSanto (story)	20th Century Fox/Marvel Studios	
2002	The Lord of the Rings: The Fellowship of the Ring*	Peter Jackson (director, screenplay), Fran Walsh (screenplay), Philippa Boyens (screenplay), J. R. R. Tolkien (original novel)	New Line Cinema/The Saul Zaentz Company/WingNut Films	
2002	Harry Potter and the Sorcerer's Stone	Chris Columbus (director), Steve Kloves (screenplay)	1492 Pictures/Heyday Films/Warner Bros.	
2002	Monsters, Inc.	Pete Docter (director, story), David Silverman (director), Lee Unkrich (director), Dan Gerson (screenplay), Andrew Stanton (screenplay), Jill Culton (story), Ralph Eggleston (story) Jeff Pidgeon (story)	Pixar/The Walt Disney Company	
2002	Buffy the Vampire Slayer: "Once More, with Feeling"	Joss Whedon (director, screenplay)	Fox Television Studios/Mutant Enemy Productions	
2002	Shrek	Andrew Adamson (director), Vicky Jenson (director), Ted Elliott (screenplay), Terry Rossio (screenplay), Joe Stillman (screenplay), Roger S. H. Schulman (screenplay), Edmund Fong (story), Ken Harsha (story)	DreamWorks/Pacific Data Images	

=== 2003–present ===
Starting with the 2003 awards, the Dramatic Presentation award was split into two categories: Best Dramatic Presentation (Long Form) and Best Dramatic Presentation (Short Form). The Long Form award is for "a dramatized production in any medium, including film, television, radio, live theater, computer games or music. The work must last 90 minutes or longer (excluding commercials)." The Short Form award is for "a dramatized production in any medium, including film, television, radio, live theater, computer games or music. The work must last less than 90 minutes (excluding commercials)." An individual work such as a television show can be nominated for a season in the Long Form category or for individual episodes in the Short Form, though not for both in the same year. As of 2017, a single show is limited to two nominations in the Short Form category per year.

==== Long Form ====
Long form winners and nominees
Year	Work	Creator(s)	Publisher(s)	Ref.
2003	The Lord of the Rings: The Two Towers*	Peter Jackson (director, screenplay), Fran Walsh (screenplay), Philippa Boyens (screenplay), Stephen Sinclair (screenplay), J. R. R. Tolkien (original novel)	New Line Cinema	
2003	Harry Potter and the Chamber of Secrets	Chris Columbus (director), Steve Kloves (screenplay), J. K. Rowling (original novel)	Warner Bros.	
2003	Minority Report	Steven Spielberg (director), Scott Frank (screenplay), Jon Cohen (screenplay), Philip K. Dick (original story)	20th Century Fox/DreamWorks	
2003	Spider-Man	Sam Raimi (director), David Koepp (screenplay), Steve Ditko (original character), Stan Lee (original character)	Columbia Pictures	
2003	Spirited Away	Hayao Miyazaki (director, screenplay), Cindy Davis Hewitt (screenplay), Donald H. Hewitt (screenplay)	Studio Ghibli/The Walt Disney Company	
2004	The Lord of the Rings: The Return of the King*	Peter Jackson (director, screenplay), Fran Walsh (screenplay), Philippa Boyens (screenplay), J. R. R. Tolkien (original novel)	New Line Cinema	
2004	28 Days Later	Danny Boyle (director), Alex Garland (screenplay)	DNA Films/Fox Searchlight Pictures	
2004	Finding Nemo	Andrew Stanton (director, screenplay, story), Lee Unkrich (director), Bob Peterson (screenplay), David Reynolds (screenplay)	Pixar/The Walt Disney Company	
2004	Pirates of the Caribbean: The Curse of the Black Pearl	Gore Verbinski (director), Ted Elliott (screenplay, story), Terry Rossio (screenplay, story), Stuart Beattie (story), Jay Wolpert (story)	The Walt Disney Company	
2004	X2: X-Men United	Bryan Singer (director, story), Michael Dougherty (screenplay), Dan Harris (screenplay), David Hayter (screenplay, story), Zak Penn (story)	20th Century Fox/Marvel Studios	
2005	The Incredibles*	Brad Bird (director, screenplay)	Pixar/The Walt Disney Company	
2005	Eternal Sunshine of the Spotless Mind	Michel Gondry (director, story), Charlie Kaufman (screenplay, story), Pierre Bismuth (story)	Focus Features	
2005	Harry Potter and the Prisoner of Azkaban	Alfonso Cuarón (director), Steve Kloves (screenplay), J. K. Rowling (original novel)	Warner Bros.	
2005	Sky Captain and the World of Tomorrow	Kerry Conran (director, screenplay)	Paramount Pictures	
2005	Spider-Man 2	Sam Raimi (director), Alvin Sargent (screenplay), Alfred Gough (story), Miles Millar (story), Michael Chabon (story), Steve Ditko (original character), Stan Lee (original character)	Sony Pictures Entertainment/Columbia Pictures	
2006	Serenity*	Joss Whedon (director, screenplay)	Universal Studios/Mutant Enemy Productions	
2006	Batman Begins	Christopher Nolan (director, screenplay), David S. Goyer (screenplay, story), Bob Kane (original character)	Warner Bros.	
2006	The Chronicles of Narnia: The Lion, the Witch and the Wardrobe	Andrew Adamson (director, screenplay), Ann Peacock (screenplay), Christopher Markus (screenplay), Stephen McFeely (screenplay), C. S. Lewis (original novel)	The Walt Disney Company/Walden Media	
2006	Harry Potter and the Goblet of Fire	Mike Newell (director), Steve Kloves (screenplay), J. K. Rowling (original novel)	Warner Bros.	
2006	Wallace & Gromit: The Curse of the Were-Rabbit	Nick Park (director, screenplay), Steve Box (director, screenplay), Bob Baker (screenplay), Mark Burton (screenplay)	DreamWorks Animation/Aardman Animations	
2007	Pan's Labyrinth*	Guillermo del Toro (director, screenplay)	Picturehouse	
2007	Children of Men	Alfonso Cuarón (director, screenplay), Timothy J. Sexton (screenplay), David Arata (screenplay), Mark Fergus (screenplay), Hawk Ostby (screenplay), P. D. James (original novel)	Universal Studios	
2007	The Prestige	Christopher Nolan (director, screenplay), Jonathan Nolan (screenplay), Christopher Priest (original novel)	Touchstone Pictures	
2007	A Scanner Darkly	Richard Linklater (director, screenplay), Philip K. Dick (original novel)	Warner Independent Pictures	
2007	V for Vendetta	James McTeigue (director), Lana Wachowski (screenplay), Lilly Wachowski (screenplay), David Lloyd (original graphic novel)	Warner Bros.	
2008	Stardust*	Matthew Vaughn (director, screenplay), Jane Goldman (screenplay), Neil Gaiman (original novel)	Paramount Pictures	
2008	Enchanted	Kevin Lima (director), Bill Kelly (screenplay)	The Walt Disney Company	
2008	The Golden Compass	Chris Weitz (director, screenplay), Philip Pullman (original novel)		
2008	Heroes (season one)	Tim Kring (creator), multiple directors and writers	NBC Universal Television Group/Tailwind Productions	
2008	Harry Potter and the Order of the Phoenix	David Yates (director), Michael Goldenberg (screenplay), J. K. Rowling (original novel)	Warner Bros.	
2009	WALL-E*	Andrew Stanton (director, screenplay, story), Jim Reardon (screenplay), Pete Docter (story)	Pixar/The Walt Disney Company	
2009	The Dark Knight	Christopher Nolan (director, screenplay, story), Jonathan Nolan (screenplay), David S. Goyer (story), Bob Kane (original character)	Warner Bros.	
2009	Hellboy II: The Golden Army	Guillermo del Toro (director, screenplay, story), Mike Mignola (story, original comic)	Dark Horse Entertainment/Universal Studios	
2009	Iron Man	Jon Favreau (director), Mark Fergus (screenplay), Hawk Ostby (screenplay), Art Marcum (screenplay), Matt Holloway (screenplay), Stan Lee (original characters), Don Heck (original characters), Larry Lieber (original characters), Jack Kirby (original characters)	Paramount Pictures/Marvel Studios	
2009	METAtropolis	John Scalzi (editor, story), Elizabeth Bear (story), Jay Lake (story), Tobias S. Buckell (story), Karl Schroeder (story)	Audible.com	
2010	Moon*	Duncan Jones (director, story), Nathan Parker (screenplay)	Liberty Films	
2010	Avatar	James Cameron (director, screenplay)	20th Century Fox	
2010	District 9	Neill Blomkamp (director, screenplay), Terri Tatchell (screenplay)	TriStar Pictures	
2010	Star Trek	J. J. Abrams (director), Roberto Orci (screenplay), Alex Kurtzman (screenplay)	Paramount Pictures	
2010	Up	Bob Peterson (director, screenplay, story), Pete Docter (director, screenplay, story), Tom McCarthy (story)	Pixar/The Walt Disney Company	
2011	Inception*	Christopher Nolan (director, screenplay, story)	Warner Bros.	
2011	Harry Potter and the Deathly Hallows – Part 1	David Yates (director), Steve Kloves (screenplay)	Warner Bros.	
2011	How to Train Your Dragon	Dean DeBlois (director, screenplay), Chris Sanders (director, screenplay), William Davies (screenplay)	DreamWorks Animation	
2011	Scott Pilgrim vs. the World	Edgar Wright (director, screenplay), Michael Bacall (screenplay)	Universal Studios	
2011	Toy Story 3	Lee Unkrich (director, story), Michael Arndt (screenplay), John Lasseter (story), Andrew Stanton (story)	Pixar/Walt Disney Pictures	
2012	Game of Thrones (season one)*	David Benioff (creator) D. B. Weiss (creator), multiple directors and writers	HBO	
2012	Captain America: The First Avenger	Joe Johnston (director), Christopher Markus (screenplay), Stephen McFeely (screenplay)	Paramount Pictures/Marvel Studios	
2012	Harry Potter and the Deathly Hallows – Part 2	David Yates (director), Steve Kloves (screenplay)	Warner Bros.	
2012	Hugo	Martin Scorsese (director), John Logan (screenplay)	Paramount Pictures	
2012	Source Code	Duncan Jones (director), Ben Ripley (screenplay)	Summit Entertainment	
2013	The Avengers*	Joss Whedon (director, screenplay)	Paramount Pictures/Marvel Studios	
2013	The Cabin in the Woods	Drew Goddard (director, screenplay), Joss Whedon (screenplay)	Mutant Enemy Productions/Lions Gate Entertainment	
2013	The Hobbit: An Unexpected Journey	Peter Jackson (director, screenplay), Fran Walsh, Philippa Boyens, and Guillermo del Toro (screenplay)	WingNut Films/New Line Cinema/Metro-Goldwyn-Mayer/Warner Bros.	
2013	The Hunger Games	Gary Ross (director, screenplay), Suzanne Collins (original novel, screenplay)	Lions Gate Entertainment/Color Force	
2013	Looper	Rian Johnson (director, screenplay)	FilmDistrict/EndGame Entertainment	
2014	Gravity*	Alfonso Cuarón (director, screenplay), Jonás Cuarón (screenplay)	Esperanto Filmoj/Heyday Films/Warner Bros.	
2014	Frozen	Chris Buck (director), Jennifer Lee (director, screenplay)	Walt Disney Studios Motion Pictures	
2014	The Hunger Games: Catching Fire	Francis Lawrence (director), Simon Beaufoy (screenplay), Michael deBruyn (screenplay), Suzanne Collins (original novel)	Lions Gate Entertainment/Color Force	
2014	Iron Man 3	Shane Black (director, screenplay), Drew Pearce (screenplay)	Marvel Studios/DMG Entertainment/Paramount Pictures	
2014	Pacific Rim	Guillermo del Toro (director, screenplay), Travis Beacham (screenplay)	Legendary Pictures/Warner Bros./Double Dare You	
2015	Guardians of the Galaxy*	James Gunn (director, screenplay), Nicole Perlman (screenplay)	Marvel Studios/Moving Picture Company	
2015	Captain America: The Winter Soldier	Anthony Russo (director), Joe Russo (director), Christopher Markus (screenplay), Stephen McFeely (screenplay), Ed Brubaker (original story)	Marvel Studios/Perception/Sony Pictures Imageworks	
2015	Edge of Tomorrow	Doug Liman (director), Christopher McQuarrie (screenplay), Jez Butterworth (screenplay), and John-Henry Butterworth (screenplay)	Village Roadshow/RatPac-Dune Entertainment/3 Arts Entertainment/Viz Productions	
2015	Interstellar	Christopher Nolan (director, screenplay), Jonathan Nolan (screenplay)	Paramount Pictures/Warner Bros. Pictures/Legendary Pictures/Lynda Obst Productions/Syncopy	
2015	The Lego Movie	Phil Lord (director, screenplay, story), Christopher Miller (director, screenplay, story), Dan Hageman (story), Kevin Hageman (story)	Warner Bros. Pictures/Village Roadshow/RatPac-Dune Entertainment/LEGO System A/S/Vertigo Entertainment/Lin Pictures	
2016	The Martian*	Ridley Scott (director), Drew Goddard (screenplay), Andy Weir (original novel)	Scott Free Productions/Kinberg Genre/20th Century Fox	
2016	Avengers: Age of Ultron	Joss Whedon (director, screenplay)	Marvel Studios/Walt Disney Studios Motion Pictures	
2016	Ex Machina	Alex Garland (director, screenplay)	Film4/DNA Films/Universal Pictures	
2016	Mad Max: Fury Road	George Miller (director, screenplay), Brendan McCarthy (screenplay), Nico Lathouris (screenplay)	Village Roadshow Pictures/Kennedy Miller Mitchell/RatPac-Dune Entertainment/Warner Bros. Pictures	
2016	Star Wars: The Force Awakens	J. J. Abrams (director, screenplay), Lawrence Kasdan (screenplay), Michael Arndt (screenplay)	Lucasfilm Ltd./Bad Robot Productions/Walt Disney Studios Motion Pictures	
2017	Arrival*	Denis Villeneuve (director), Eric Heisserer (screenplay), Ted Chiang (original short story)	21 Laps Entertainment/FilmNation Entertainment/Lava Bear Films	
2017	Deadpool	Tim Miller (director), Rhett Reese (screenplay), Paul Wernick (screenplay)	Twentieth Century Fox Film Corporation/Marvel Entertainment/Kinberg Genre/The Donners' Company	
2017	Ghostbusters	Paul Feig (director, screenplay), Katie Dippold (screenplay)	Columbia Pictures/LStar Capital/Village Roadshow Pictures/Pascal Pictures/Feigco Entertainment/Ghostcorps/The Montecito Picture Company	
2017	Hidden Figures	Theodore Melfi (director, screenplay), Allison Schroeder (screenplay)	Fox 2000 Pictures/Chernin Entertainment/Levantine Films	
2017	Rogue One	Gareth Edwards (director), Chris Weitz (screenplay), Tony Gilroy (screenplay)	Lucasfilm/Allison Shearmur Productions/Black Hangar Studios/Stereo D/Walt Disney Pictures	
2017	Stranger Things (season one)	The Duffer Brothers (creators)	21 Laps Entertainment/Monkey Massacre	
2018	Wonder Woman*	Patty Jenkins (director), Allan Heinberg (screenplay, story), Zack Snyder (story), Jason Fuchs (story)	DC Films/Warner Brothers	
2018	Blade Runner 2049	Denis Villeneuve (director), Hampton Fancher (screenplay), Michael Green (screenplay)	Alcon Entertainment/Bud Yorkin Productions/Torridon Films/Columbia Pictures	
2018	Get Out	Jordan Peele (director, screenplay)	Blumhouse Productions/Monkeypaw Productions/QC Entertainment	
2018	The Shape of Water	Guillermo del Toro (director, screenplay), Vanessa Taylor (screenwriter)	Disney Double Dare You/Fox Searchlight Pictures	
2018	Star Wars: The Last Jedi	Rian Johnson (director, screenplay)	Lucasfilm	
2018	Thor: Ragnarok	Taika Waititi (director), Eric Pearson (screenplay), Craig Kyle (screenplay), Christopher Yost (screenwriter)	Marvel Studios	
2019	Spider-Man: Into the Spider-Verse*	Bob Persichetti (director), Peter Ramsey (director), Rodney Rothman (director, screenplay), Phil Lord (screenplay)	Sony	
2019	Annihilation	Alex Garland (director, screenplay), Jeff VanderMeer (original novel)	Paramount Pictures/Skydance Media	
2019	Avengers: Infinity War	Anthony Russo (director), Joe Russo (director), Christopher Markus (screenplay), Stephen McFeely (screenplay)	Marvel Studios	
2019	Black Panther	Ryan Coogler (director, screenplay), Joe Robert Cole (screenplay)	Marvel Studios	
2019	A Quiet Place	John Krasinski (director, screenplay), Scott Beck (screenplay), Bryan Woods (screenplay)	Platinum Dunes/Sunday Night	
2019	Sorry to Bother You	Boots Riley (director, screenplay)	Annapurna Pictures	
2020	Good Omens (season one)*	Douglas Mackinnon (director), Neil Gaiman (screenplay, original novel), Terry Pratchett (original novel)	Amazon Studios	
2020	Avengers: Endgame	Anthony Russo (director), Joe Russo (director), Christopher Markus (screenwriter), Stephen McFeely (screenplay)	Marvel Studios	
2020	Captain Marvel	Anna Boden and Ryan Fleck (directors, screenplay), Geneva Robertson-Dworet (screenplay)	Marvel Studios	
2020	Russian Doll (season one)	Natasha Lyonne (co-creator, director), Leslye Headland (co-creator, director), Amy Poehler (co-creator), Jamie Babbit (director)	Netflix	
2020	Star Wars: The Rise of Skywalker	J. J. Abrams (director, screenplay), Chris Terrio (screenplay)	Lucasfilm	
2020	Us	Jordan Peele (director, screenplay)	Monkeypaw Productions	
2021	The Old Guard*	Gina Prince-Bythewood (director), Greg Rucka (screenplay)	Netflix/Skydance Media	
2021	Birds of Prey (and the Fantabulous Emancipation of One Harley Quinn)	Cathy Yan (director), Christina Hodson (screenplay)	Warner Bros.	
2021	Eurovision Song Contest: The Story of Fire Saga	David Dobkin (director), Will Ferrell (screenplay), Andrew Steele (screenplay)	European Broadcasting Union/Netflix	
2021	Palm Springs	Max Barbakow (director), Andy Siara (screenplay)	Limelight/Sun Entertainment Culture/The Lonely Island/Culmination Productions/Neon/Hulu/Amazon Prime	
2021	Soul	Pete Docter (director, screenplay), Mike Jones (screenplay), Kemp Powers (screenplay), Dana Murray (producer)	Pixar Animation Studios/Walt Disney Pictures	
2021	Tenet	Christopher Nolan (director, screenplay)	Warner Bros./Syncopy	
2022	Dune*	Denis Villeneuve (director, screenplay), Jon Spaihts (screenplay), Eric Roth (screenplay), Frank Herbert (original novel)	Warner Bros./Legendary Entertainment	
2022	Encanto	Jared Bush (director, screenplay), Charise Castro Smith (director, screenplay), Byron Howard (director)	Walt Disney Studios Motion Pictures	
2022	The Green Knight	David Lowery (director, screenplay)	BRON Studios/A24	
2022	Shang-Chi and the Legend of the Ten Rings	Destin Daniel Cretton (director, screenplay), David Callaham (screenplay), Andrew Lanham (screenplay)	Walt Disney Studios Motion Pictures	
2022	Space Sweepers	Jo Sung-hee (director, screenplay), Yookang Seo-ae (screenplay), Yoon Seung-min (screenplay)	Bidangil Pictures	
2022	WandaVision	Jac Schaeffer (creator, writer), Matt Shakman (director), Gretchen Enders (writer), Megan McDonnell (writer), Bobak Esfarjani (writer), Peter Cameron (writer), Mackenzie Dohr (writer), Chuck Hayward (writer), Cameron Squires (writer), Laura Donney (writer)	Disney+	
2023	Everything Everywhere All at Once*	Daniel Kwan (director, screenplay), Daniel Scheinert (director, screenplay)	IAC Films/Gozie AGBO	
2023	Avatar: The Way of Water	James Cameron (director, screenplay), Rick Jaffa (screenplay), Amanda Silver (screenplay)	Lightstorm Entertainment	
2023	Black Panther: Wakanda Forever	Ryan Coogler (director, screenplay), Joe Robert Cole (screenplay)	Marvel Studios	
2023	Nope	Jordan Peele (director, screenplay)	Universal Pictures/Monkeypaw Productions	
2023	Severance (season one)	Ben Stiller (director), Aoife McArdle (director), Dan Erickson (creator, writer), Anna Ouyang Moench (writer), Andrew Colville (writer), Kari Drake (writer), Amanda Overton (writer), Helen Leigh (writer), Chris Black (writer)	Red Hour Productions/Fifth Season	
2023	Turning Red	Domee Shi (director, screenplay), Julia Cho (screenplay)	Walt Disney Studios/Pixar Animation Studios	
2024	Dungeons & Dragons: Honor Among Thieves*	John Francis Daley (director, screenplay), Jonathan Goldstein (director, screenplay), Michael Gilio (screenplay)	Paramount Pictures	
2024	Barbie	Greta Gerwig (director, screenplay), Noah Baumbach (screenplay)	Warner Bros.	
2024	Nimona	Nick Bruno (director), Troy Quane (director), Robert L. Baird (screenplay), Lloyd Taylor (screenplay)	Annapurna Animation	
2024	Poor Things	Yorgos Lanthimos (director), Tony McNamara (screenplay)	Element Pictures	
2024	Spider-Man: Across the Spider-Verse	Joaquim Dos Santos (director), Kemp Powers (director), Justin K. Thompson (director), Phil Lord (screenplay), Christopher Miller (screenplay), David Callaham (screenplay)	Columbia Pictures/Marvel Entertainment/Avi Arad Productions/Lord Miller/Pascal Pictures/Sony Pictures Animation	
2024	The Wandering Earth 2	Frant Gwo (director, screenplay), Yang Zhixue (screenplay), Wang Hongwei (screenplay), Liu Cixin (original story)	CFC Pictures/G!Film (Beijing) Studio Co./Beijing Dengfeng International Culture Communication Co./China Film Co.	
2025	Dune: Part Two*	Denis Villeneuve (director, screenplay), Jon Spaihts (screenplay),	Legendary Pictures/Warner Bros. Pictures	
2025	Flow	Gints Zilbalodis (director, screenplay), Matīss Kaža (screenplay)	Dream Well Studio	
2025	Furiosa: A Mad Max Saga	George Miller (director, screenplay), Nico Lathouris (screenplay)	Warner Bros. Pictures	
2025	I Saw the TV Glow	Jane Schoenbrun (director, screenplay)	Fruit Tree/Smudge Films/A24	
2025	Wicked	Jon M. Chu (director), Winnie Holzman (screenplay), Dana Fox (screenplay)	Universal Pictures	
2025	The Wild Robot	Chris Sanders (director, screenplay), Peter Brown (original novel)	DreamWorks Animation	
2026	Sinners*	Ryan Coogler (director, screenplay)	Proximity Media/Warner Bros. Pictures	
2026	Andor (season two)	Ariel Kleiman (director), Janus Metz (director), Alonso Ruizpalacios (director), Tom Bissell (writer), Dan Gilroy (writer), Tony Gilroy (writer), Beau Willimon (writer)	Disney+	
2026	Frankenstein	Guillermo del Toro (director, screenplay)	Netflix	
2026	KPop Demon Hunters	Maggie Kang (director, screenplay), Chris Appelhans (director, screenplay), Danya Jimenez (screenplay), Hannah McMechan (screenplay)	Sony Pictures Animation for Netflix	
2026	Mickey 17	Bong Joon Ho (director, screenplay)	Warner Bros. Pictures	
2026	Superman	James Gunn (director, screenplay)	DC Studios	

==== Short Form ====
Short form winners and nominees
Year	Work	Creator(s)	Publisher(s)	Ref.
2003	Buffy the Vampire Slayer: "Conversations with Dead People"*	Nick Marck (director), Jane Espenson (screenplay), Drew Goddard (screenplay)	20th Century Fox Television/Mutant Enemy Productions	
2003	Angel: "Waiting in the Wings"	Joss Whedon (director, screenplay)	20th Century Fox Television/Mutant Enemy Productions	
2003	Firefly: "Serenity"	Joss Whedon (director, screenplay)	20th Century Fox Television/Mutant Enemy Productions	
2003	Star Trek: Enterprise: "Carbon Creek"	James A. Contner (director), Chris Black (screenplay), Rick Berman (story), Brannon Braga (story), Dan O'Shannon (story)	Paramount Pictures	
2003	Star Trek: Enterprise: "A Night in Sickbay"	David Straiton (director), Rick Berman (screenplay), Brannon Braga (screenplay)	Paramount Pictures	
2004	Gollum's Acceptance Speech at the 2003 MTV Movie Awards*	Fran Walsh (director, screenplay), Philippa Boyens (director, screenplay), Peter Jackson (director, screenplay)	Wingnut Films/New Line Cinema	
2004	Buffy the Vampire Slayer: "Chosen"	Joss Whedon (director, screenplay)	20th Century Fox Television/Mutant Enemy Productions	
2004	Firefly: "Heart of Gold"	Thomas J. Wright (director), Brett Matthews (screenplay)	20th Century Fox Television/Mutant Enemy Productions	
2004	Firefly: "The Message"	Tim Minear (director, screenplay), Joss Whedon (screenplay)	20th Century Fox Television/Mutant Enemy Productions	
2004	Smallville: "Rosetta"	James Marshall (director), Alfred Gough (screenplay), Miles Millar (screenplay)	Tollin/Robbins Productions/Warner Bros.	
2005	Battlestar Galactica: "33"*	Michael Rymer (director), Ronald D. Moore (screenplay)	NBC Universal/Sci Fi Channel	
2005	Angel: "Not Fade Away"	Jeffrey Jackson Bell (director, screenplay), Joss Whedon (screenplay)	20th Century Fox Television/Mutant Enemy Productions	
2005	Angel: "Smile Time"	Ben Edlund (director, screenplay, story), Joss Whedon (story)	20th Century Fox Television/Mutant Enemy Productions	
2005	Lost: "Pilot"	J. J. Abrams (director, screenplay, story), Damon Lindelof (screenplay, story), Jeffrey Lieber (story)	Touchstone Pictures/Bad Robot	
2005	Stargate SG-1: "Heroes"	Andy Mikita (director), Robert C. Cooper (screenplay)	Metro-Goldwyn-Mayer/Sci Fi Channel	
2006	Doctor Who: "The Empty Child"/"The Doctor Dances"*	James Hawes (director), Steven Moffat (screenplay)	BBC Cymru Wales/BBC One	
2006	Battlestar Galactica: "Pegasus"	Michael Rymer (director), Anne Cofell Saunders (screenplay)	NBC Universal/British Sky Broadcasting	
2006	Doctor Who: "Dalek"	Joe Ahearne (director), Robert Shearman (screenplay)	BBC Cymru Wales/BBC One	
2006	Doctor Who: "Father's Day"	Joe Ahearne (director), Paul Cornell (screenplay)	BBC Cymru Wales/BBC One	
2006	Jack-Jack Attack	Brad Bird (director, screenplay)	The Walt Disney Company/Pixar	
2006	Lucas Back in Anger	Phil Raines (director, script), Ian Sorensen (script)	Reductio Ad Absurdum Productions	
2006	Prix Victor Hugo Awards Ceremony	Paul J. McAuley (performer, script), Kim Newman (performer, script), Mike Moir (director), Debby Moir (director)	Interaction Events	
2007	Doctor Who: "The Girl in the Fireplace"*	Euros Lyn (director), Steven Moffat (screenplay)	BBC Cymru Wales/BBC One	
2007	Battlestar Galactica: "Downloaded"	Jeff Woolnough (director), Bradley Thompson (screenplay), David Weddle (screenplay)	NBC Universal/British Sky Broadcasting	
2007	Doctor Who: "Army of Ghosts"/"Doomsday"	Graeme Harper (director), Russell T Davies (screenplay)	BBC Cymru Wales/BBC One	
2007	Doctor Who: "School Reunion"	James Hawes (director), Toby Whithouse (screenplay)	BBC Cymru Wales/BBC One	
2007	Stargate SG-1: "200"	Martin Wood (director), Brad Wright (screenplay), Robert C. Cooper (screenplay), Joseph Mallozzi (screenplay), Paul Mullie (screenplay), Carl Binder (screenplay), Martin Gero (screenplay), Alan McCullough (screenplay)	Double Secret Productions/NBC Universal	
2008	Doctor Who: "Blink"*	Hettie MacDonald (director), Steven Moffat (screenplay)	BBC	
2008	Battlestar Galactica: "Razor"	Félix Enríquez Alcalá (director), Wayne Rose (director), Michael Taylor (screenplay)	Sci Fi Channel	
2008	Doctor Who: "Human Nature"/"The Family of Blood"	Charles Palmer (director), Paul Cornell (screenplay)	BBC	
2008	Star Trek New Voyages: "World Enough and Time"	Marc Scott Zicree (director, screenplay), Michael Reaves (screenplay)	Cawley Entertainment Company/The Magic Time Company	
2008	Torchwood: "Captain Jack Harkness"	Ashley Way (director), Catherine Tregenna (screenplay)	BBC Cymru Wales	
2009	Dr. Horrible's Sing-Along Blog*	Joss Whedon (director, screenplay), Zack Whedon (screenplay), Jed Whedon (screenplay), Maurissa Tancharoen (screenplay)	Mutant Enemy Productions	
2009	Battlestar Galactica: "Revelations"	Michael Rymer (director), Bradley Thompson (screenplay), David Weddle (screenplay)	NBC Universal	
2009	Doctor Who: "Silence in the Library"/"Forest of the Dead"	Euros Lyn (director), Steven Moffat (screenplay)	BBC Cymru Wales	
2009	Doctor Who: "Turn Left"	Graeme Harper (director), Russell T Davies (screenplay)	BBC Cymru Wales	
2009	Lost: "The Constant"	Jack Bender (director), Carlton Cuse (screenplay), Damon Lindelof (screenplay)	Bad Robot/ABC Studios	
2010	Doctor Who: "The Waters of Mars"*	Graeme Harper (director), Russell T Davies (screenplay), Phil Ford (screenplay)	BBC Cymru Wales	
2010	Doctor Who: "The Next Doctor"	Andy Goddard (director), Russell T Davies (screenplay)	BBC Cymru Wales	
2010	Doctor Who: "Planet of the Dead"	James Strong (director), Russell T Davies (screenplay), Gareth Roberts (screenplay)	BBC Cymru Wales	
2010	Dollhouse: "Epitaph One"	David Solomon (director), Maurissa Tancharoen (screenplay), Jed Whedon (screenplay), Joss Whedon (story)	Mutant Enemy Productions	
2010	FlashForward: "No More Good Days"	David S. Goyer (director, screenplay), Brannon Braga (screenplay), Robert J. Sawyer (original novel)	American Broadcasting Company	
2011	Doctor Who: "The Pandorica Opens"/"The Big Bang"*	Toby Haynes (director), Steven Moffat (screenplay)	BBC Cymru Wales	
2011	Doctor Who: "A Christmas Carol"	Toby Haynes (director), Steven Moffat (screenplay)	BBC Cymru Wales	
2011	Doctor Who: "Vincent and the Doctor"	Jonny Campbell (director), Richard Curtis (screenplay)	BBC Cymru Wales	
2011	Fuck Me, Ray Bradbury	Paul Briganti (director), Rachel Bloom (screenplay)		
2011	The Lost Thing	Shaun Tan (director, original story), Andrew Ruhemann (director)	Passion Pictures	
2012	Doctor Who: "The Doctor's Wife"*	Richard Clark (director), Neil Gaiman (screenplay)	BBC Cymru Wales	
2012	Community: "Remedial Chaos Theory"	Jeff Melman (director), Dan Harmon (creator), Chris McKenna (screenplay)	NBC	
2012	Doctor Who: "The Girl Who Waited"	Nick Hurran (director), Tom MacRae (screenplay)	BBC Cymru Wales	
2012	Doctor Who: "A Good Man Goes to War"	Peter Hoar (director), Steven Moffat (screenplay)	BBC Cymru Wales	
2012	The Drink Tank's Hugo Acceptance Speech	Christopher J Garcia, James Bacon	Renovation	
2013	Game of Thrones: "Blackwater"*	Neil Marshall (director), George R. R. Martin (original novel, screenplay)	HBO	
2013	Doctor Who: "Asylum of the Daleks"	Nick Hurran (director), Steven Moffat (screenplay)	BBC Cymru Wales	
2013	Doctor Who: "The Angels Take Manhattan"	Nick Hurran (director), Steven Moffat (screenplay)	BBC Cymru Wales	
2013	Doctor Who: "The Snowmen"	Saul Metzstein (director), Steven Moffat (screenplay)	BBC Cymru Wales	
2013	Fringe: "Letters of Transit"	Joe Chappelle (director), J. J. Abrams, Alex Kurtzman, Roberto Orci, Akiva Goldsman, J. H. Wyman, Jeff Pinkner (screenplay)	Fox Broadcasting Company	
2014	Game of Thrones: "The Rains of Castamere"*	David Nutter (director), David Benioff (screenplay), D. B. Weiss (screenplay), George R. R. Martin (original novel)	HBO	
2014	An Adventure in Space and Time	Terry McDonough (director), Mark Gatiss (screenplay)	BBC Television	
2014	Doctor Who: "The Day of the Doctor"	Nick Hurran (director), Steven Moffat (screenplay)	BBC Television	
2014	Doctor Who: "The Name of the Doctor"	Saul Metzstein (director), Steven Moffat (screenplay)	BBC Television	
2014	The Five(ish) Doctors Reboot	Peter Davison (director, screenplay)	BBC Television	
2014	Orphan Black: "Variations under Domestication"	John Fawcett (director), Will Pascoe (screenplay)	Temple Street Productions/Space/BBC America	
2015	Orphan Black: "By Means Which Have Never Yet Been Tried"*	John Fawcett (director), Graeme Manson (screenplay)	Temple Street Productions, Space/BBC America	
2015	Doctor Who: "Listen"	Douglas Mackinnon (director), Steven Moffat (screenplay)	BBC Television	
2015	The Flash: "Pilot"	David Nutter (director), Andrew Kreisberg (screenplay, story), Geoff Johns (screenplay, story), Greg Berlanti (screenplay, story)	Berlanti Productions/DC Entertainment/Warner Bros. Television	
2015	Game of Thrones: "The Mountain and the Viper"	Alex Graves (director), David Benioff (screenplay), D. B. Weiss (screenplay), George R. R. Martin (original novel)	HBO/Bighead, Littlehead/Television 360/Startling Television/Generator Productions	
2015	Grimm: "Once We Were Gods"	Steven DePaul (director), Alan Di Fiore (screenplay)	GK Productions/Hazy Mills Productions/Universal Television	
2016	Jessica Jones: "AKA Smile"*	Michael Rymer (director), Scott Reynolds (screenplay), Melissa Rosenberg (screenplay), Jamie King (screenplay)	Marvel Television/ABC Studios/Tall Girls Productions/Netflix	
2016	Doctor Who: "Heaven Sent"	Rachel Talalay (director), Steven Moffat (screenplay)	BBC Television	
2016	Grimm: "Headache"	Jim Kouf (director), Jim Kouf (screenplay), David Greenwalt (screenplay)	GK Productions/Hazy Mills Productions/Universal Television	
2016	My Little Pony: Friendship Is Magic: "The Cutie Map" Parts 1 and 2	Jayson Thiessen (director), Jim Miller (director), Scott Sonneborn (screenplay), M.A. Larson (screenplay), Meghan McCarthy (screenplay)	DHX Media/Vancouver/Hasbro Studios	
2016	Supernatural: "Just My Imagination"	Richard Speight, Jr. (director), Jenny Klein (screenplay)	Kripke Enterprises/Wonderland Sound and Vision/Warner Bros. Television	
2017	The Expanse: "Leviathan Wakes"*	Terry McDonough (director), Mark Fergus and Hawk Ostby (screenplay), James S. A. Corey (original novel)	SyFy	
2017	Black Mirror: "San Junipero"	Owen Harris (director), Charlie Brooker (screenplay)	House of Tomorrow	
2017	Doctor Who: "The Return of Doctor Mysterio"	Edward Bazalgette (director), Steven Moffat (screenplay)	BBC Television	
2017	Game of Thrones: "Battle of the Bastards"	Miguel Sapochnik (director), David Benioff (screenplay), D. B. Weiss (screenplay), George R. R. Martin (original novel)	HBO	
2017	Game of Thrones: "The Door"	Jack Bender (director), David Benioff (screenplay), D. B. Weiss (screenplay), George R. R. Martin (original novel)	HBO	
2017	Splendor & Misery	Clipping (Daveed Diggs, William Hutson, Jonathan Snipes)	Sub Pop, Deathbomb Arc	
2018	The Good Place: "The Trolley Problem"*	Dean Holland (director), Josh Siegal (screenwriter), Dylan Morgan (screenwriter)	Fremulon/3 Arts Entertainment/Universal Television	
2018	Black Mirror: "USS Callister"	Toby Haynes (director), William Bridges (screenplay), Charlie Brooker (screenplay)	House of Tomorrow	
2018	"The Deep"	Clipping (Daveed Diggs, William Hutson, Jonathan Snipes)	This American Life	
2018	Doctor Who: "Twice Upon a Time"	Rachel Talalay (director), Steven Moffat (screenplay)	BBC Television	
2018	The Good Place: "Michael's Gambit"	Michael Schur (director, screenplay)	Fremulon/3 Arts Entertainment/Universal Television	
2018	Star Trek: Discovery: "Magic to Make the Sanest Man Go Mad"	David M. Barrett (director), Aron Eli Coleite (screenplay), Jesse Alexander (screenplay)	CBS Television Studios	
2019	The Good Place: "Janet(s)"*	Morgan Sackett (director), Josh Siegal (screenplay), Dylan Morgan (screenplay)	NBC	
2019	Dirty Computer	Andrew Donoho, Chuck Lightning (director), Janelle Monáe (screenplay)	Wondaland Arts Society/Bad Boy Records/Atlantic Records	
2019	Doctor Who: "Demons of the Punjab"	Jamie Childs (director), Vinay Patel (screenplay)	BBC	
2019	Doctor Who: "Rosa"	Mark Tonderai (director), Malorie Blackman (screenplay), Chris Chibnall (screenplay)	BBC	
2019	The Expanse: "Abaddon's Gate"	Simon Cellan Jones (director), Daniel Abraham (screenplay, original novel), Ty Franck (screenplay, original novel), Naren Shankar (screenplay)	Penguin in a Parka/Alcon Entertainment	
2019	The Good Place: "Jeremy Bearimy"	Trent O'Donnell (director), Megan Amram (screenplay)	NBC	
2020	The Good Place: "The Answer"*	Valeria Migliassi Collins (director), Daniel Schofield (screenplay)	NBC	
2020	Doctor Who: "Resolution"	Wayne Yip (director), Chris Chibnall (screenplay)	BBC	
2020	The Expanse: "Cibola Burn"	Breck Eisner (director), Daniel Abraham (screenplay, original novel), Ty Franck (screenplay, original novel), Naren Shankar (screenplay)	Amazon Prime Video	
2020	The Mandalorian: "Chapter 8: Redemption"	Taika Waititi (director), Jon Favreau (screenplay)	Disney+	
2020	Watchmen: "A God Walks into Abar"	Nicole Kassell (director), Jeff Jensen (screenplay), Damon Lindelof (screenplay)	HBO	
2020	Watchmen: "This Extraordinary Being"	Stephen Williams (director), Damon Lindelof (screenplay), Cord Jefferson (screenplay)	HBO	
2021	The Good Place: "Whenever You're Ready"*	Michael Schur (director, screenplay)	Fremulon/3 Arts Entertainment/Universal Television	
2021	Doctor Who: "Fugitive of the Judoon"	Nida Manzoor (director), Vinay Patel (screenplay), Chris Chibnall (screenplay)	BBC	
2021	The Expanse: "Gaugamela"	Nick Gomez (director), Dan Nowak (screenplay), Daniel Abraham (original novel), Ty Franck (screenplay, original novel)	Alcon Entertainment/Alcon Television Group/Amazon Studios/Hivemind/Just So	
2021	She-Ra and the Princesses of Power: "Heart"	Jen Bennett (director), Kiki Manrique (director), Josie Campbell (screenplay), ND Stevenson (screenplay)	DreamWorks Animation Television/Netflix	
2021	The Mandalorian: "Chapter 13: The Jedi"	Dave Filoni (director, screenplay)	Golem Creations/Lucasfilm/Disney+	
2021	The Mandalorian: "Chapter 16: The Rescue"	Peyton Reed (director), Jon Favreau (screenplay)	Golem Creations/Lucasfilm/Disney+	
2022	The Expanse: "Nemesis Games"*	Breck Eisner (director), Daniel Abraham (screenplay, original novel), Ty Franck (screenplay, original novel), Naren Shankar (screenplay)	Amazon Studios	
2022	Arcane: "The Monster You Created"	Pascal Charrue (director), Arnaud Delord (director), Christian Linke (screenplay, story), Alex Yee (screenplay, story), Conor Sheehy, (story), Ash Brannon (story)	Netflix	
2022	For All Mankind: "The Grey"	Sergio Mimica-Gezzan (director), Matt Wolpert (screenplay), Ben Nevidi (screenplay)	Tall Ship Productions/Sony Pictures Television	
2022	Loki: "The Nexus Event"	Michael Waldron (creator), Kate Herron (director), Eric Martin (screenplay)	Disney+	
2022	Star Trek: Lower Decks: "wej Duj"	Bob Suarez (director), Kathryn Lyn (screenplay)	CBS Eye Animation Productions	
2022	The Wheel of Time: "The Flame of Tar Valon"	Salli Richardson-Whitfield (director), Justine Juel Gillmer (screenplay), Robert Jordan (original novels)	Amazon Studios	
2023	The Expanse: "Babylon's Ashes"*	Breck Eisner (director), Daniel Abraham (screenplay, original novel), Ty Franck (screenplay, original novel), Naren Shankar (screenplay)	Alcon Entertainment	
2023	Andor: "One Way Out"	Toby Haynes (director), Beau Willimon (screenplay), Tony Gilroy (creator), George Lucas (based on Star Wars by)	Lucasfilm	
2023	Andor: "Rix Road"	Benjamin Caron (director), Tony Gilroy (creator, screenplay), George Lucas (based on Star Wars by)	Lucasfilm	
2023	For All Mankind: "Stranger in a Strange Land"	Craig Zisk (director), Matt Wolpert (screenplay), Ben Nedivi (screenplay)	Tall Ship Productions/Sony Pictures Television	
2023	She-Hulk: Attorney at Law: "Whose Show Is This?"	Kat Coiro (director), Jessica Gao (screenplay), Francesca Gailes (screenplay), Jacqueline Gailes (screenplay)	Marvel Entertainment	
2023	Stranger Things: "Chapter Four: Dear Billy"	Shawn Levy (director), Matt Duffer (creator), Ross Duffer (creator), Paul Dichter (screenplay)	21 Laps Entertainment	
2024	The Last of Us: "Long, Long Time"*	Peter Hoar (director), Craig Mazin (screenplay), Neil Druckmann (screenplay)	Naughty Dog/Sony Pictures	
2024	Doctor Who: "The Giggle"	Chanya Button (director), Russell T. Davies (screenplay)	Bad Wolf/BBC	
2024	Loki: "Glorious Purpose"	Justin Benson (director), Aaron Moorhead (director), Eric Martin (screenplay), Michael Waldron (screenplay), Katharyn Blair (screenplay)	Marvel Entertainment/Disney+	
2024	Star Trek: Strange New Worlds: "Those Old Scientists"	Jonathan Frakes (director), Kathryn Lyn (screenplay), Bill Wolkoff (screenplay)	CBS/Paramount+	
2024	Star Trek: Strange New Worlds: "Subspace Rhapsody"	Dermott Downs (director), Dana Horgan (screenplay), Bill Wolkoff (screenplay)	CBS/Paramount+	
2024	Doctor Who: "Wild Blue Yonder"	Tom Kingsley (director), Russell T. Davies (screenplay)	Bad Wolf/BBC	
2025	Star Trek: Lower Decks: "The New Next Generation"*	Megan Lloyd (director), Mike McMahan (screenplay)	CBS/Paramount+	
2025	Fallout: "The Beginning"	Wayne Che Yip (director), Gursimran Sandhu (screenplay)	Amazon Prime Video	
2025	Agatha All Along: "Death's Hand in Mine"	Jac Schaeffer (director), Gia King (screenplay), Cameron Squires (screenplay)	Marvel/Disney+	
2025	Doctor Who: "Dot and Bubble"	Dylan Holmes Williams (director), Russell T Davies (screenplay)	BBC/Disney+	
2025	Star Trek: Lower Decks: "Fissure Quest"	Brandon Williams (director), Lauren McGuire (screenplay)	CBS/Paramount+	
2025	Doctor Who: "73 Yards"	Dylan Holmes Williams (director), Russell T Davies (screenplay)	BBC/Disney+	
2026	Murderbot: "All Systems Red"*	Roseanne Liang (director), Paul Weitz (screenplay), Chris Weitz (screenplay)	Apple TV	
2026	Doctor Who: "The Story & the Engine"	Makalla McPherson (director), Inua Ellams (screenplay)	BBC One/Disney+	
2026	Murderbot: "The Perimeter"	Paul Weitz (director, screenplay), Chris Weitz (screenplay)	Apple TV	
2026	Pluribus: "We Is Us"	Vince Gilligan (director, screenplay)	Apple TV	
2026	Severance: "Cold Harbor"	Ben Stiller (director), Dan Erickson (screenplay)	Apple TV	
2026	The Wheel of Time: "The Road to the Spear"	Thomas Napper (director), Rafe Lee Judkins (screenplay), Robert Jordan (original novel)	Amazon Prime Video	

=== Retro Hugos ===
Between the 1996 Worldcon and 2025 Worldcon, the World Science Fiction Society had the concept of "Retro-Hugos", in which the Hugo award could be retroactively awarded for 50, 75, or 100 years prior. Retro-Hugos could only be awarded for years after 1939 (the year of the first Worldcon) in which no Hugos were originally awarded. In 1946 and 1951, an award was given for Best Dramatic Presentation, as the category had not yet been split, while in 1939, 1943, 1945, and 1954 an award was given for Best Dramatic Presentation, Short Form. The Long Form category did not receive enough nominations for an award to be given in those years. The 1941 and 1944 Retro Hugos awarded both Long and Short Forms.

Retro Hugos winners and nominees
Year	Year awarded	Work	Creator(s)	Publisher(s)	Ref.
1939	2014	The War of the Worlds*	Orson Welles (director, screenplay), H.G. Wells (original novel)	The Mercury Theatre on the Air/CBS	
1939	2014	Around the World in Eighty Days	Orson Welles (director, screenplay), Jules Verne (original novel)	The Mercury Theatre on the Air/CBS	
1939	2014	A Christmas Carol	Orson Welles (director, screenplay), Charles Dickens (original novella)	The Campbell Playhouse/CBS	
1939	2014	Dracula	Orson Welles (director, screenplay), John Houseman (screenplay), Bram Stoker (original novel)	The Mercury Theatre on the Air/CBS	
1939	2014	R.U.R.	Jan Bussell (producer), Karel Čapek (original play)	BBC	
1941 (Long Form)	2016	Fantasia*	Samuel Armstrong et al. (director), Joe Grant (screenplay), Dick Huemer (screenplay)	Walt Disney Productions, RKO Radio Pictures	
1941 (Long Form)	2016	Dr. Cyclops	Ernest B. Schoedsack (director), Tom Kilpatrick (screenplay)	Paramount Pictures	
1941 (Long Form)	2016	Flash Gordon Conquers the Universe	Ford Beebe (director), Ray Taylor (director), George H. Plympton (screenplay), Basil Dickey (screenplay), Barry Shipman (screenplay)	Universal Pictures	
1941 (Long Form)	2016	One Million B.C.	Hal Roach (director), Hal Roach, Jr. (director), Mickell Novack (screenplay), George Baker (screenplay), Joseph Frickert (screenplay)	United Artists	
1941 (Long Form)	2016	The Thief of Bagdad	Michael Powell (director), Ludwig Berger (director), Tim Whelan (director), Lajos Bíró (screenplay), Miles Malleson (screenplay)	London Films, United Artists	
1941 (Short Form)	2016	Pinocchio*	Ben Sharpsteen (director), Hamilton Luske (director), Ted Sears et al. (screenplay)	Walt Disney Productions, RKO Radio Pictures	
1941 (Short Form)	2016	The Adventures of Superman: "The Baby from Krypton"	Frank Chase (producer), George Ludlam (screenplay)	WOR	
1941 (Short Form)	2016	The Invisible Man Returns	Joe May (director, screenplay), Kurt Siodmak (screenplay), Lester Cole (screenplay)	Universal Pictures	
1941 (Short Form)	2016	Looney Tunes: "You Ought to Be in Pictures"	Friz Freleng (director), Jack Miller (screenplay)	Warner Bros.	
1941 (Short Form)	2016	Merrie Melodies: "A Wild Hare"	Tex Avery (director), Rich Hogan (screenplay)	Warner Bros.	
1943	2018	Bambi*	David Hand et al. (director), Perce Pearce (screenplay), Larry Morey et al. (screenplay), Felix Salten (original novel)	The Walt Disney Company	
1943	2018	Cat People	Jacques Tourneur (director), DeWitt Bodeen (screenplay), Val Lewton (original novel)	RKO Radio Pictures	
1943	2018	The Ghost of Frankenstein	Erle C. Kenton (director), W. Scott Darling (screenplay)	Universal Pictures	
1943	2018	I Married a Witch	René Clair (director), Robert Pirosh (screenplay), Marc Connelly (screenplay), Thorne Smith (original novel)	Cinema Guild Productions / Paramount Pictures	
1943	2018	Invisible Agent	Edwin L. Marin (director), Curtis Siodmak (screenplay)	Frank Lloyd Productions / Universal Pictures	
1943	2018	Rudyard Kipling's Jungle Book	Zoltan Korda (director), Laurence Stallings (screenplay), Rudyard Kipling (original novel)	Alexander Korda Films / United Artists	
1944 (Long Form)	2019	Heaven Can Wait*	Ernst Lubitsch (director), Samson Raphaelson (screenplay)	20th Century Fox	
1944 (Long Form)	2019	Batman	Lambert Hillyer (director), Victor McLeod (screenplay), Leslie Swabacker (screenplay), Harry L. Fraser (screenplay)	Columbia Pictures	
1944 (Long Form)	2019	Cabin in the Sky	Vincente Minnelli (director), Busby Berkeley (uncredited director), Joseph Schrank (screenplay)	MGM	
1944 (Long Form)	2019	A Guy Named Joe	Victor Fleming (director), Frederick Hazlitt Brennan (screenplay), Dalton Trumbo (screenplay)	MGM	
1944 (Long Form)	2019	Münchhausen	Josef von Báky (director), Erich Kästner (screenplay), Rudolph Erich Raspe (screenplay)	UFA	
1944 (Long Form)	2019	Phantom of the Opera	Arthur Lubin (director), Eric Taylor (screenplay), Samuel Hoffenstein (screenplay), Hans Jacoby (story)	Universal Pictures	
1944 (Short Form)	2019	Frankenstein Meets the Wolf Man*	Roy William Neil (director), Curt Siodmak (screenplay)	Universal Pictures	
1944 (Short Form)	2019	The Ape Man	William Beaudine (director), Barney A. Sarecky (screenplay)	Banner Productions	
1944 (Short Form)	2019	Der Fuehrer's Face	Jack Kinney (director), Joe Grant (story), Dick Huemer (story))	The Walt Disney Company	
1944 (Short Form)	2019	I Walked With a Zombie	Jacques Tourneur (director), Curt Siodmak (screenplay), Ardel Wray (screenplay)	RKO Radio Pictures	
1944 (Short Form)	2019	The Seventh Victim	Mark Robson (director), Charles O'Neal (screenplay), DeWitt Bodeen (screenplay)	RKO Radio Pictures	
1944 (Short Form)	2019	Merrie Melodies: "Super-Rabbit"	Charles M. Jones (director), Tedd Pierce (story)	Warner Bros.	
1945 (Short Form)	2020	The Canterville Ghost*	Jules Dassin (director), Edwin Harvey Blum (screenplay), Oscar Wilde (original short story)	MGM	
1945 (Short Form)	2020	The Curse of the Cat People*	Gunther V. Fritsch (director), Robert Wise (director), DeWitt Bodeen (screenplay)	RKO Radio Pictures	
1945 (Short Form)	2020	Donovan's Brain	William Spier (producer, director, editor), Robert L. Richards (screenplay), Curt Siodmak (original novel)	CBS Radio Network	
1945 (Short Form)	2020	The House of Frankenstein	Erle C. Kenton (director), Edward T. Lowe Jr. (screenplay), Curt Siodmak (original story)	Universal Pictures	
1945 (Short Form)	2020	The Invisible Man's Revenge	Ford Beebe, (director), Bertram Millhauser (screenplay)	Universal Pictures	
1945 (Short Form)	2020	It Happened Tomorrow	René Clair (director, screenplay), Dudley Nichols (screenplay)	Arnold Pressburger Films	
1946	1996	The Picture of Dorian Gray*	Albert Lewin (director, screenplay), Oscar Wilde (original novel)	Metro-Goldwyn-Mayer	
1946	1996	Blithe Spirit	David Lean (director, screenplay), Anthony Havelock-Allan (screenplay), Ronald Neame (screenplay), Noël Coward (original play)	United Artists	
1946	1996	The Body Snatcher	Robert Wise (director), Philip MacDonald (screenplay), Val Lewton (screenplay), Robert Louis Stevenson (original story)	RKO Radio Pictures	
1946	1996	The Horn Blows at Midnight	Raoul Walsh (director), Sam Hellman (screenplay), James V. Kern (screenplay)	Warner Bros.	
1946	1996	House of Dracula	Erle C. Kenton (director), Edward T. Lowe, Jr. (screenplay)	Universal Studios	
1951	2001	Destination Moon*	Irving Pichel (director), Alford Van Ronkel (screenplay), James O'Hanlon (screenplay), Robert A. Heinlein (screenplay, original novel)	George Pal Productions	
1951	2001	Cinderella	Clyde Geronimi (director) Wilfred Jackson (director) Hamilton Luske (director) Ken Anderson (screenplay), Homer Brightman (screenplay), Winston Hibler (screenplay), Bill Peet (screenplay), Erdman Penner (screenplay), Harry Reeves (screenplay), Joe Rinaldi (screenplay), Ted Sears (screenplay), Charles Perrault (original story)	The Walt Disney Company	
1951	2001	Harvey	Henry Koster (director), Oscar Brodney (screenplay), Myles Connolly (screenplay), Mary Chase (screenplay, original play)	Universal Studios	
1951	2001	Looney Tunes: "Rabbit of Seville"	Chuck Jones (director), Michael Maltese (story)	Warner Bros.	
1951	2001	Rocketship X-M	Kurt Neumann (director, screenplay), Dalton Trumbo (screenplay), Orville H. Hampton (screenplay)	Lippert Pictures	
1954	2004	The War of the Worlds*	Byron Haskin (director), Barré Lyndon (screenplay), H. G. Wells (original novel)	Paramount Pictures	
1954	2004	The Beast from 20,000 Fathoms	Eugène Lourié (director), Louis Morheim (screenplay), Fred Freiberger (screenplay), Ray Bradbury (original story)	Mutual Pictures/Warner Bros.	
1954	2004	Merrie Melodies: "Duck Dodgers in the 24½th Century"	Chuck Jones (director), Michael Maltese (screenplay)	Warner Bros.	
1954	2004	Invaders from Mars	William Cameron Menzies (director), Richard Blake (screenplay), John Tucker Battle (story)	National Pictures/20th Century Fox	
1954	2004	It Came from Outer Space	Jack Arnold (director), Harry Essex (screenplay), Ray Bradbury (original story)	Universal Studios	

== See also ==
- Nebula Award for Best Script
- Ray Bradbury Award for Outstanding Dramatic Presentation
- List of joint winners of the Hugo and Nebula awards
