= The Night That All Time Broke Out =

- Short story by Brian W. Aldiss
- Language: English
- Genre(s): Science fiction

Publication
- Published in: Dangerous Visions
- Publication type: anthology
- Publisher: Doubleday
- Media type: Print (Hardcover)
- Publication date: 1967

"The Night That All Time Broke Out" is a short story by Brian W. Aldiss from Harlan Ellison's Dangerous Visions.

== Plot ==
The story presents a future world where time itself can be concentrated into a substance which is inhaled and used as a drug, causing the user to temporarily regress to an earlier time period. There is an explosion at the factory which produces the gas, causing a widespread regression of civilization (though it is unclear as to the extent).
