= The Doll-House =

- Short story by James Cross
- Country: United States
- Language: English
- Genre(s): Science fiction short story

Publication
- Published in: Dangerous Visions
- Publication type: Anthology
- Publisher: Doubleday
- Media type: Hardback
- Publication date: 1967

"The Doll-House" is a short story by Hugh Jones Parry, under the name "James Cross". It was first published in Harlan Ellison's 1967 science fiction anthology Dangerous Visions.

== Synopsis ==
When Jim Eliot is in financial trouble, he asks for help from his wife's uncle, who gives him a dollhouse containing a miniature oracle. From lack of patience he loses this oracle in the end.

== Development ==
Per Algis Budrys, the short story was one of two stories that was "simply submitted by the authors ' literary agent when Harlan got desperate for material".

== Reception ==
Ted Gioia described "The Doll-House" as "a very appealing mixture of ancient mythology and modern psychodrama". Algis Budrys said that it was a Weird Tales-style story, only published in Dangerous Visions because "Harlan got desperate for material".

The manuscript for "The Doll-House" is held in the Hugh Parry collection at Boston University.
