= If All Men Were Brothers, Would You Let One Marry Your Sister? =

Short story by Theodore Sturgeon

"If All Men Were Brothers, Would You Let One Marry Your Sister?" is a science fiction short story by American writer Theodore Sturgeon. It first appeared in Harlan Ellison's anthology Dangerous Visions in 1967.

== Plot ==
An Earthman visits the planet Vexvelt, which is shunned by the rest of the colonized universe for unknown reasons. He finds it a utopian paradise, but then discovers to his shock and horror that incest is actively encouraged there.

== Reception ==
Paul Kincaid has called it "beautifully constructed" and "oddly lyrical", and a story "upon which Sturgeon's reputation can comfortably rest", but noted that its tone can be "loud and hectoring", and conceded that the basic premise of Vexvelt being shunned for a reason nobody knows "doesn't altogether make sense". Brian Stableford has described it as a "curious moral parable", whose "wild optimism (...) is as unappealing as it is unconvincing", while Brian Aldiss felt that the title was "cutesy", and Algis Budrys called the story "just plain terrible".

=== Awards ===
- Nebula Award for Best Novelette (1967, nominated)
