= Sex and/or Mr. Morrison =

1967 short story by Carol Emshwiller

"Sex and/or Mr. Morrison" is a short story by Carol Emshwiller from Harlan Ellison's science fiction anthology Dangerous Visions. It has been republished in Emshwiller's 1974 collection Joy In Our Cause, in Pamela Sargent's 1975 anthology Women of Wonder, in Emshwiller's 1990 collection The Start of the End of It All, in Lisa Tuttle's 1998 anthology Crossing the Border, in Michael Bishop's 2009 anthology Passing for Human, and in the 2011 Collected Stories of Carol Emshwiller, Vol. 1; it has also been translated into French and Dutch.

== Plot ==
An elderly woman becomes obsessed with her tenant, Mr. Morrison — who may be more than she had imagined.

== Reception ==
The SF Site called "Sex and/or Mr. Morrison" "one of the creepiest and most memorable stories" in Dangerous Visions. Algis Budrys said that it was the best in the collection and "one of the finest short stories I have ever read", and Lewis Call described it as "a celebration of desire for the alien". L. Timmel Duchamp has stated that, upon rereading the story after "many years", she was no longer able to bring herself to accept that Mr. Morrison was an extraterrestrial disguised as a human, and instead perceived the narrator as a mentally ill voyeur; similarly, James Nicoll said that although he felt that Emshwiller "intended her narrative to be touching", he perceived the story as "a depiction of an unwarranted trespass".
