= Judas (short story) =

- Short story by John Brunner
- Country: USA
- Language: English
- Genre(s): Science fiction

Publication
- Published in: Dangerous Visions
- Publication type: Print
- Publisher: Doubleday
- Media type: Short story
- Publication date: October 1967

"Judas" is a short story by John Brunner from Harlan Ellison's anthology Dangerous Visions. The story examines a modern allegory of the Biblical figure of Judas.

== Reception ==
Algis Budrys called it "sophomoric".

== Translations ==
- Romanian: Iuda (2013)
