= Shall the Dust Praise Thee? =

- Short story by Damon Knight
- Language: English
- Genre: Science fiction

Publication
- Published in: Dangerous Visions
- Publication type: Anthology
- Publication date: December 1967

"Shall the Dust Praise Thee?" is a science fiction short story by American writer Damon Knight. It was first published in the anthology Dangerous Visions (1967). His agent refused to publish it and suggested the Atheist Journal in Moscow might buy it, but no one else would. The title comes from Psalm 30:9 in the Bible.

In the story, God arrives on planet Earth for Judgement Day, but finds out that human extinction has already taken place and that there is no one left to judge. His angels inform him that humanity wiped itself out in nuclear warfare. There is one last human message left for the deity, asking him where he was. There is no one left to listen to the answer.

== Summary ==
God arrives on Earth, ready to inflict the Day of Wrath on humankind, but finds that all life has already disappeared. The angels tell God that there has been a great war between England, Russia, China, and America which has wiped out all life on earth, and that the true end of days had already occurred through nuclear warfare. No living creatures, no water, no grass, nothing but dust and brittle stone remain on the world. All that remains of humanity is the phrase left by the last humans as a message to God, saying, "WE WERE HERE. WHERE WERE YOU?"
