= Parry Jones =

Parry Jones or Parry-Jones may refer to:

- Cai Parry-Jones (born 1996), Welsh politician, Member of the Senedd (from 2026)
- Caryl Parry Jones (born 1958), Welsh female singer
- David Parry-Jones (1933–2017), Welsh sports commentator
- Gwynn Parry Jones (1891–1963), Welsh tenor
- Rhys Parry Jones (active from 1993), Welsh TV actor
- Richard Parry-Jones (1951–2021), British automobile designer
- Tom Parry Jones (1935–2013), Welsh scientist and inventor

== See also ==
- Love Parry Jones-Parry (1781–1853), British army officer and High Sheriff of Anglesey
- Jones Parry
