= Gonna Roll the Bones =

- Novelette by Fritz Leiber
- Country: United States
- Language: English
- Genre: Fantasy novelette

Publication
- Published in: Dangerous Visions
- Publication type: Anthology
- Publisher: Doubleday
- Media type: Print (Hardcover & Paperback)
- Publication date: 1967
- Pages: 22
- Award: Hugo Award for Best Novelette (1968); Nebula Award for Best Novelette (1968)

"Gonna Roll the Bones" is a fantasy novelette by American writer Fritz Leiber, in which a character plays craps with Death. First published in Harlan Ellison's Dangerous Visions, it won both the Hugo Award and Nebula Award for Best Novelette.

The story was adapted as a children's book, written by Sarah L. Thomson, illustrated by David Wiesner, and published in 2004 by Milk and Cookies Press.

== Summary ==
Joe Slattermill is a poor miner whose home life serves as a never-ending source of frustration. His wife works at home as a baker to supplement the family's income, while his elderly mother lives with them and regularly voices her disapproval of his lifestyle. His only outlet comes in the form of occasional visits to the local gambling parlors, where he routinely loses all his money, gets drunk, and has sex with prostitutes; he then returns home, beats his wife, and winds up spending the night in jail. On his latest trip, though, he finds that a new club has opened—"The Boneyard"—and decides to try it out.

Joe possesses a remarkable skill for precision throwing and can make dice show whatever number he wants when he rolls them. Joining a high-stakes game of craps played around a table whose shape is vaguely familiar to him, he uses this talent to win several thousand dollars before confronting the table's "Big Gambler", a pale figure hidden beneath a dark hat and long coat. This man bankrupts all the other players with his own brand of precision throwing, and Joe loses all his money upon accidentally rolling a double-six. Instead of ending the game at this point, however, the Big Gambler offers to bet all his winnings, plus the world and everything in it, against Joe's life and soul. By now, Joe has come to believe that he is facing off against Death incarnate.

Joe rolls the dice and gets snake eyes, losing the bet. He prepares to kill himself by diving into the table, having learned that it is an entrance to some kind of deep shaft filled with intense heat, but instead leaps across and tackles the Big Gambler. The latter's body crumbles on impact and Joe is thrown out of the club, though he manages to steal a handful of casino chips before this happens.

Out on the sidewalk, he finds that he has held onto a piece of the Big Gambler's skull, which looks suspiciously like a piece of pastry. Tasting it, he discovers that it is in fact made of bread and remembers the loaves his wife had been putting into the oven when he left, shaped like the Big Gambler's skull and ribcage. He recalls the scene he saw for an instant as he looked down into the table while lunging across it: a view of his living room from inside the oven his wife had been using to bake the bread. He realizes that she has somehow created this adversary in order to humiliate him.

The stolen chips prove to be communion wafers, as evidenced by the cross imprinted on each one. Now free of his wife's influence and with a pocketful of food, he goes home "the long way, around the world."

== Reception ==
Michael Swanwick wrote that "Gonna Roll the Bones" is a "glorious story." Algis Budrys called "Bones" a "rather effective" story.
