= David R. Bunch =

American writer

- Born: David Roosevelt Bunch; August 7, 1925; Lowry City, Missouri, U.S.
- Died: May 29, 2000 (aged 74); St. Louis, Missouri, U.S.
- Occupation: Writer
- Known for: Short stories and poetry

David Roosevelt Bunch (August 7, 1925 – May 29, 2000) was an American writer of short stories and poetry. He worked mainly in the genres of science fiction, satire, surrealism, and literary fiction. Although prolific and critically acclaimed, Bunch remained obscure throughout his career. He is mainly known for a series of violent, bleak stories set in the cyborg dystopia of Moderan, which collectively form a satire on humanity's obsession with violence and control.

== Personal life ==
Bunch was born on August 7, 1925, on a farm outside Lowry City, Missouri. He graduated from Central Missouri State University with a Bachelor of Science degree, then received a master's degree in English from Washington University in St. Louis. He pursued a Ph.D. in English Literature at Washington University and the State University of Iowa, but rather than completing his doctoral dissertation, he shifted to creative writing and studied for two years at the Iowa Writers' Workshop before dropping out.

Bunch worked extensively on farms in the Midwest, taking low-level jobs in diverse industries. He later worked as a cartographer and map-chart editor for the Defense Mapping Agency in St. Louis until he retired in 1973 to pursue full-time freelance writing. He died of a heart attack on May 29, 2000.

Bunch married Phyllis Geraldine Flette and they had two daughters, Phyllis Elaine and Velma Lorraine.

== Writing career ==
According to his long-time proponent Judith Merril, Bunch published over 200 stories and poems prior to his first professional science fiction sale, a short story called "Routine Emergency" in the December 1957 edition of If.

He published at least 100 stories in science fiction magazines between 1957 and 1997, and nearly as many in literary magazines. No comprehensive David R. Bunch bibliography is known to exist; Bunch published almost exclusively in little magazines, digest-sized fiction magazines and fanzines, making a complete tally difficult (as the latter, particularly, are poorly indexed, and few indexes cover both the full range of little magazines and their more-commercial peers).

Much of Bunch's recognition comes from his inclusion in Harlan Ellison's New Wave anthology Dangerous Visions. Of the 32 writers selected, Bunch was the only one to have two stories included: "Incident in Moderan" and "The Escaping".

His second collection of stories, Bunch!, was nominated for the Philip K. Dick Award in 1993.

== The Moderan sequence ==
Throughout his career, Bunch worked on a group of satirical far-future SF stories set in Moderan, a version of Earth paved over entirely with gray plastic and controlled by perpetually warring cyborg fortresses. Although the society of Moderan seems to project an appearance of personal valor and military perfection, its citizens are ultimately powerless, dominated by their own petty insecurities and hubris.

Forty-six of the Moderan stories were collected in Moderan (1971), linked by a complex frame-story. The collection was not reprinted until 2018 and became a collector's item. Despite its relative rarity, it is sometimes suggested as a major work of New Wave science fiction and could have influenced cyberpunk.

Bunch continued to write and publish Moderan stories throughout his career. He had longed to see a complete collection of the Moderan sequence published. In 2018, New York Review Books Classics published an updated Moderan collection, including stories not found in the original edition.

== Works ==
=== Collections ===
- Moderan, New York, Avon Books, 1971.
- Bunch!, Cambridge, Broken Mirrors Press, 1993. ISBN 1-880910-00-4

=== Poetry ===
- We Have a Nervous Job, 1983. Astoria, Oregon, Alba Press, 1983.
- The Heartacher and the Warehouseman, San Francisco, Anamnesis Press, 2000. ISBN 0-9631203-7-9
