= Driftglass =

1971 collection of science fiction short stories by Samuel R. Delany

- First edition.
- Author: Samuel R. Delany
- Cover artist: David Wilcox
- Language: English
- Genre: Science fiction, fantasy
- Publisher: Nelson Doubleday
- Publication date: 1971
- Publication place: United States
- Media type: Print (hardback & paperback)
- Pages: 278

Driftglass is a 1971 collection of science fiction short stories by American writer Samuel R. Delany. The stories originally appeared in the magazines Worlds of Tomorrow, The Magazine of Fantasy & Science Fiction, If and New Worlds or the anthologies Quark/3, Dangerous Visions and Alchemy & Academe. In 2019, Driftglass was selected as one of the "50 Unapologetically Queer Authors Share the Best LGBTQ Books of All Time" in O, The Oprah Magazine.

== Contents ==
- "The Star Pit"
- "Dog in a Fisherman’s Net"
- "Corona"
- "Aye, and Gomorrah..." (winner of the Nebula Award)
- "Driftglass"
- "We, in Some Strange Power’s Employ, Move on a Rigorous Line"
- "Cage of Brass"
- "High Weir"
- "Time Considered as a Helix of Semi-Precious Stones" (winner of the Hugo Award and Nebula Award)
- "Night and the Loves of Joe Dicostanzo"

== Sources ==
- "The Internet Speculative Fiction Database".
- Contento, William G. "Index to Science Fiction Anthologies and Collections". Archived from the original on January 6, 2008.
