= Land of the Great Horses =

- Short story by R. A. Lafferty
- Country: USA
- Language: English
- Genre: science fiction

Publication
- Published in: Dangerous Visions
- Publication type: Print
- Publisher: Doubleday
- Media type: short story
- Publication date: October 1967
- Series: Institute for Impure Science

"Land of the Great Horses" is a short story by R. A. Lafferty from Harlan Ellison's science fiction anthology Dangerous Visions. The story takes a broad view of the earth after extraterrestrials (the Outer Visitors) return the native land of the Romany (the Land of the Great Horses), on which they had been experimenting. Roma everywhere leave their work to return to it.

They then scoop up the city of Los Angeles, whose residents become the new wanderers, Angelenos. When asked what happened, they commonly reply, "They came and took our Dizz away from us."

== Publication history ==
- Dangerous Visions, ed. Harlan Ellison, Garden City, NY: Doubleday 1967 pp427–437
- Nine Hundred Grandmothers (1970) R. A. Lafferty
- The Best of R. A. Lafferty (Gollancz, 2019; Tor, 2021)

== Translations ==
- Czech – Kraj velkých koní, Světová literatura (World Literature) bi-monthly 1982/4
- Dutch – Het Land van de Grote Paarden (1971)
- Finnish – Suurten hevosten maa, Portti (4/1982)
- French – La terre des grands chevaux (1975)
- German – Heimkehr der Heimatlosen ("Homesickness of the Homeless", 1970)
  - German – Land der grossen Pferde (1974)
  - German – Das Land der großen Pferde (1997)
- Italian - Terra Dei Grandi Cavalli (1980)
- Japanese - 巨馬の国 (1981)
- Polish - Kraina wielkich koni, Foreign Literature monthly (1/1976)
- Romanian - Ținutul cailor măreți (2013)
