= A Toy for Juliette =

Short story by Robert Bloch

- Short story by Robert Bloch
- Language: English
- Genres: Science fiction, horror fiction

Publication
- Published in: Dangerous Visions
- Publication type: anthology
- Publisher: Doubleday
- Media type: Print (Hardcover)
- Publication date: 1967

Chronology
—	The Prowler in the City at the Edge of the World

"A Toy for Juliette" is a 1967 science fiction and horror short story by American writer Robert Bloch, appearing for the first time in Harlan Ellison's anthology Dangerous Visions.

== Plot ==
In a post-apocalyptic world, a time traveler randomly abducts people from throughout history for his granddaughter Juliette (named for the Marquis de Sade's novel Juliette) to torture and kill in her sexual games. The last "toy" he gives her, however, turns out to be Jack the Ripper.

== Reception ==
SFF World has called it "unsettling".

== Sequel ==
Ellison wrote a sequel for the same anthology called "The Prowler in the City at the Edge of the World".

== See also ==
- Jack the Ripper in fiction
