= The Prowler in the City at the Edge of the World =

- Short story by Harlan Ellison
- Language: English
- Genre: Science fiction

Publication
- Published in: Dangerous Visions
- Publication type: Anthology
- Publisher: Doubleday
- Media type: Print (Hardcover)
- Publication date: 1967

"The Prowler in the City at the Edge of the World" is a science fiction short story by American writer Harlan Ellison, first published in his 1967 anthology Dangerous Visions. It was intended as a continuation of a story by Robert Bloch, "A Toy for Juliette", which also appears in the anthology.

== Plot summary ==
Jack the Ripper appears inexplicably in a sterile futuristic metropolis, where anyone is free to do what they want however arcane or immoral. He is brought before Juliette, a girl who is named after the Marquis de Sade's Juliette.

Upon killing Juliette (much to the delight of a City denizen who is her grandfather), Jack the Ripper is returned to the London of his own time, where he commits another of his infamous killings. He is surprised to discover that there are other mental presences or personalities coexisting within his own mind, commenting on the brutality of his acts as if they were spectators at a theatrical performance or aesthetes critiquing a work of art in a museum.

Although recognizably human in form, the future City's denizens have powers of matter manipulation, time travel, and telepathy. They can both read and manipulate Jack the Ripper's mind. They proceed for their own malign amusement to mentally expose him to his own subconscious lusts, desires, and petty hatreds; prior to their interference he had suppressed his awareness of these urges. He realizes that he had persuaded himself that his killings were purely moralistic in intent, meant to draw attention to the injustices, inequalities, social wretchedness, and debauchery of industrial Victorian society. To Jack's despair, his actual base motivations are fully revealed to him by the City's denizens, after which they delight in his ensuing psychological anguish.

He is recalled to the City of the future by its inhabitants. Enraged, he kills one of his tormentors. Jack is fooled by the City denizens into believing that this murder has caused a breakdown in their society and that they have lost control of the City's functioning. He is implicitly led to believe that he has all the power and is an uncontrollable, random evil in their presence. He embarks on a killing spree to terrify the City's residents and punish them for their manipulation of him. After brutally murdering scores of City denizens in a veritable frenzy of bloodlust, Jack learns to his horror that the City denizens have only manipulated him again to sate their decadent desire for entertainment. The surviving denizens disarm him, leaving him to roam the City streets aimlessly. He cries aloud that he really is a "bad man", a man to be respected and feared rather than mocked and thrown aside.
