= Aye, and Gomorrah =

Science fiction short story by Samuel R. Delany

"Aye, and Gomorrah..."
- Short story by Samuel R. Delany
- Country: United States
- Language: English
- Genre: Science fiction short story

Publication
- Published in: Dangerous Visions
- Publication type: Anthology
- Publisher: Doubleday
- Media type: Print (Hardcover & Paperback)
- Publication date: 1967
- Pages: 11
- Award: Nebula Award for Best Short Story (1968)

"Aye, and Gomorrah..." is a New Wave science fiction short story by American writer Samuel R. Delany. It is the first short story Delany sold, and won the 1967 Nebula Award for best short story. Before it appeared in Driftglass and Aye, and Gomorrah, and other stories, it first appeared as the final story in Harlan Ellison's seminal 1967 anthology, Dangerous Visions. It was controversial because of its sexual subject matter, and has been called "one of the best stories by a gay man published in the 1960s."

Graham Sleight has described it as a "revisionist take" on Cordwainer Smith's story "Scanners Live in Vain".

== Synopsis ==
The narrative involves a world where astronauts, known as Spacers, are neutered before puberty to avoid the effects of space radiation on gametes. Aside from making them sterile, the neutering also prevents puberty from occurring and results in androgynous adults whose birth-sex is unclear to others. Spacers are fetishized by a subculture of "frelks", those attracted by the Spacers' supposed unattainability and unarousability ("free-fall-sexual-displacement complex"). "Frelk" is used as a derogatory term by the Spacers in the story, who engage in prostitution by accepting money to give frelks the sexual contact they desire.
