= Auto-da-Fé (short story) =

- Short story by Roger Zelazny
- Language: English
- Genre: Science fiction

Publication
- Published in: Dangerous Visions
- Publication type: anthology
- Publication date: December 1967

"Auto-da-Fé" is a short story by Roger Zelazny from Harlan Ellison's science fiction anthology Dangerous Visions. The plot concerns a contest analogous to a bullfight between humans and autonomous cars, with human "mechadors" who combat robotic Chevrolets or Pontiacs. It has been reprinted at least 40 times, in at least four languages.

The title is a play on words involving the phrases auto-da-fé and automobile. James Machell has taken note of the mechador being resurrected, stating that "Zelazny was interested in reincarnation and Eastern religions, exploring them in novels like Lord of Light, and Auto-da-Fé is his grotesque inversion of them."
