= Mutant Enemy =

American production company

Mutant Enemy Productions
- Type: Private
- Industry: Film industry
- Genre: Production company
- Founded: Los Angeles, California, U.S. (1996; 30 years ago)
- Founder: Joss Whedon
- Headquarters: Los Angeles, California, U.S.
- Key people: Joss Whedon
- Products: Films; Television series Web series

Mutant Enemy Productions is an American production company founded in 1996 by Joss Whedon to produce Buffy the Vampire Slayer. The company also produced the Buffy spin-off Angel, and his two short-lived science fiction series, the space Western Firefly and his high-concept Dollhouse, produced by 20th Century Fox Television. Mutant Enemy also produced the internet series Dr. Horrible's Sing-Along Blog, the film The Cabin in the Woods, and the superhero series Agents of S.H.I.E.L.D., along with ABC Studios and Marvel Television. Most recently, Mutant Enemy produced the supernatural fiction series The Nevers for HBO.

Its offices (made out of glass bricks) were on the lot of 20th Century Fox in Los Angeles, previously the home of Chris Carter's Ten Thirteen Productions. According to March 2006's issue of UK magazine The Word, the offices were closed not long after Angel was cancelled.

== Filmography ==
The following table lists the production credits of Mutant Enemy:

Title	Format	Year
Buffy the Vampire Slayer	Television series	1997–2003
Angel	Television series	1999–2004
Firefly	Television series	2002
Dr. Horrible's Sing-Along Blog	Web series	2008
Dollhouse	Television series	2009–2010
Buffy the Vampire Slayer: Season 8 Motion Comic	Animated series	2010–2011
Comic-Con Episode IV: A Fan's Hope	Documentary	2012
The Cabin in the Woods	Film	2012
Agents of S.H.I.E.L.D.	Television series	2013–2020
The Nevers	Television series	2021–2023

== Name and logo ==
=== Name ===
The name "Mutant Enemy" is taken from the song "And You and I" by progressive rock band Yes, of whom Whedon is a professed fan: "There'll be no mutant enemy/we shall certify/political ends/as sad remains will die." (On the special features of the Buffy DVDs, Whedon also says in an interview that he called his typewriter "mutant enemy".)

=== Original end-of-credits logo ===
The original Mutant Enemy logo, as seen at the end of Buffy the Vampire Slayer, Firefly, and other productions

The company's end-of-credits logo and mascot is an intentionally poorly animated vampire monster cartoon figure crossing the screen from right to left and saying, "Grr. Argh." It was drawn and voiced by Whedon himself. In certain episodes of Buffy the animation was changed:

- "Becoming, Part Two": Homer Simpson from The Simpsons says "Oooh, I need a hug".
- "Amends": He wears a Santa hat.
- "Graduation Day, Part Two": He wears a graduation cap—the image used is a reversed logo from the U.S. national college honor society Mortar Board.
- "Once More, with Feeling": He sings the line in falsetto.
- "Storyteller": The monster (overdubbed by cast member Adam Busch) sings a line from the episode, "We are as Gods".
- "Chosen": He turns and pulls a face at the viewer.

The episode "Bargaining, Part One" references the end-of-credits logo. Tara gives Giles a small rubber monster and says "And a monster. Sort of a Sunnydale souvenir, we thought. Grr. Argh." In season seven of Buffy, there is a species of ancient Vampires called "Turok-Han" or Ubervamps. They look like more detailed versions of the Mutant Enemy.

In the canonical Buffy the Vampire Slayer: Season 8 comic books, issue 22 "Swell", on page 10, the slogan for an in-comic fictional product is "Vampy Cat! Grr! Argh! He'll love you to <obscured> the Santorio Corporation!"

==== Parodies ====
At the end of the credits of the animated sketch comedy parody show Robot Chicken, a parody of the Mutant Enemy, Inc. logo appeared with Joss Whedon (guest starring as himself) providing the "Grr... Argh..." As the enemy mutant rips apart the city, the scene cuts to an office where Joss Whedon is playing with dolls and an executive says to him, "Come on Joss, that's why you got kicked off Wonder Woman."

=== New end-of-credits logo ===
With The Nevers, the Mutant Enemy vampire end-credits logo was replaced. The new end-of-credits card features a typewriter, upon which the company's name is affixed as an embossed label maker label.

== Staff ==
Staff members of Mutant Enemy, all of whom have writing and/or production credits on at least one of the above shows, have included, in alphabetical order:

- Jeffrey Bell
- Elizabeth Craft
- Steven S. DeKnight
- Ben Edlund
- Jane Espenson
- Sarah Fain
- David Fury
- Ashley Gable
- Drew Goddard
- Drew Z. Greenberg
- David Greenwalt
- Rebecca Rand Kirshner
- Tim Minear
- Jose Molina
- Marti Noxon
- Doug Petrie
- Mere Smith
- Maurissa Tancharoen
- Jed Whedon
- Joss Whedon
- Zack Whedon
