= Hugh Jones Parry =

British-born American writer and sociologist (1916–1997)

Hugh Jones Parry (March 10, 1916 – December 3, 1997) was a British-born American writer and sociologist. He wrote fiction as James Cross.

Hugh Jones Parry was born on March 10, 1916, in London, to Jane Myfanwy (Jones) and John Parry. The family came to the United States in 1919, moving to Scarsdale, New York. He received a bachelor's degree from Yale University in 1937, a master's from Columbia University in 1939, and a PhD from the University of Southern California in 1949.

Parry was in the United States Navy during World War II, stationed in the Aleutian Islands. He then worked in military intelligence and as a researcher in several diplomatic positions. In 1958, he became a researcher at the United States Information Agency in Washington, D.C.

Parry was an assistant professor of sociology and social psychology at the University of Denver from 1947 to 1949. As of 1967, he taught sociology at George Washington University, where he worked at the Social Research Group. While teaching, he wrote thrillers and short stories as James Cross, some of which drew on his time as an intelligence operative. He retired in 1982.

Parry died on December 3, 1997, at Sibley Memorial Hospital in Washington, D.C.

== Publications ==
- Root of Evil (1957)
- The Dark Road (1959)
- The Grave of Heroes (1961)
- To Hell for Half a Crown (1967)
- The Doll-House (1967, short story), in Dangerous Visions
