= Dangerous Visions =

Science fiction short story anthology edited by Harlan Ellison

- Cover of first edition (hardcover)
- Editor: Harlan Ellison
- Illustrator: Leo and Diane Dillon
- Language: English
- Genre: Science fiction
- Publisher: Doubleday
- Publication date: 1967
- Publication place: United States
- Media type: Print (Hardcover & Paperback)
- Pages: 544
- Followed by: Again, Dangerous Visions

Dangerous Visions is an anthology of science fiction short stories edited by American writer Harlan Ellison and illustrated by Leo and Diane Dillon. It was published in 1967 and contained 33 stories, none of which had been previously published.

A path-breaking collection, Dangerous Visions helped define the New Wave science fiction movement, particularly in its depiction of sex in science fiction. Writer/editor Al Sarrantonio wrote that Dangerous Visions "almost single-handedly [...] changed the way readers thought about science fiction."

Contributors to the volume included 20 authors who had won, or would win, a Hugo, Nebula, World Fantasy, or BSFA award, and 16 with multiple such awards. Ellison introduced the anthology both collectively and individually while the authors provided afterwords to their stories.

== Contents ==
Illustrations by Leo and Diane Dillon accompany each short story.

- "Foreword 1 - The Second Revolution" by Isaac Asimov
- "Foreword 2 - Harlan and I" by Isaac Asimov
- "Thirty-Two Soothsayers" (introduction) by Harlan Ellison
- "Evensong" by Lester del Rey. This is described by its author as an allegory. It details the capture of a being, identified at the end of the story as God, by Man, which has usurped God's power.
- "Flies" by Robert Silverberg. It was inspired by a quote from King Lear: "As flies to wanton boys are we to the gods. They kill us for their sport."
- "The Day After the Day the Martians Came" by Frederik Pohl
- "Riders of the Purple Wage" by Philip José Farmer (Hugo Award for best novella)
- "The Malley System" by Miriam Allen deFord
- "A Toy for Juliette" by Robert Bloch
- "The Prowler in the City at the Edge of the World" by Harlan Ellison
- "The Night That All Time Broke Out" by Brian W. Aldiss
- "The Man Who Went to the Moon — Twice" by Howard Rodman
- "Faith of Our Fathers" by Philip K. Dick
- "The Jigsaw Man" by Larry Niven
- "Gonna Roll the Bones" by Fritz Leiber (Hugo and Nebula awards for Best Novelette)
- "Lord Randy, My Son" by Joe L. Hensley
- "Eutopia" by Poul Anderson
- "Incident in Moderan" and "The Escaping" by David R. Bunch
- "The Doll-House" by James Cross (pseudonym of Hugh Jones Parry)
- "Sex and/or Mr. Morrison" by Carol Emshwiller
- "Shall the Dust Praise Thee?" by Damon Knight
- "If All Men Were Brothers, Would You Let One Marry Your Sister?" by Theodore Sturgeon
- "What Happened to Auguste Clarot?" by Larry Eisenberg
- "Ersatz" by Henry Slesar
- "Go, Go, Go, Said the Bird" by Sonya Dorman
- "The Happy Breed" by John Sladek
- "Encounter with a Hick" by Jonathan Brand
- "From the Government Printing Office" by Kris Neville
- "Land of the Great Horses" by R. A. Lafferty
- "The Recognition" by J. G. Ballard
- "Judas" by John Brunner
- "Test to Destruction" by Keith Laumer
- "Carcinoma Angels" by Norman Spinrad
- "Auto-da-Fé" by Roger Zelazny
- "Aye, and Gomorrah" by Samuel R. Delany (Nebula Award for best short story, 1967)

== Awards and nominations ==
The stories and the anthology itself were nominated for and received many awards. "Gonna Roll the Bones" by Fritz Leiber received both a Hugo Award for Best Novelette and a Nebula Award for Best Novelette, whilst Philip K. Dick's "Faith of Our Fathers" was a nominee for the Hugo in the same category. Philip José Farmer tied for the Hugo Award for Best Novella for "Riders of the Purple Wage". Samuel R. Delany won the Nebula for Best Short Story for "Aye, and Gomorrah..." Harlan Ellison received a special citation at the 26th World SF Convention for editing "the most significant and controversial SF book published in 1967."

== Reception ==
"You should buy this book immediately", Algis Budrys wrote, "because this is a book that knows perfectly well that you are seething inside". He especially praised "Sex and/or Mr. Morrison".

Dave Langford reviewed Dangerous Visions for White Dwarf #94 (1987), and stated that it "poked at all SF's taboos, remains a quirky mix of achievement and hype, of stories still brilliantly fresh and stories already moribund two decades ago."

== Sequels ==
The collection was followed by a larger 1972 sequel, Again, Dangerous Visions.

The projected third collection, The Last Dangerous Visions, was started, but controversially remained unpublished for decades. The final book has become something of a legend as science fiction's most famous unpublished book. It was originally announced for publication in 1973, but other work demanded Ellison's attention and the anthology did not see print in his lifetime. He came under criticism for his treatment of some writers who submitted their stories to him, whom some estimate to number nearly 150 (and many of whom have died in the ensuing more than four decades since the anthology was first announced). In 1993 Ellison threatened to sue New England Science Fiction Association (NESFA) for publishing "Himself in Anachron", a short story written by Cordwainer Smith and sold to Ellison for the book by his widow, but later reached an amicable settlement. British science fiction author Christopher Priest critiqued Ellison's editorial practices in a widely disseminated article titled "The Book on the Edge of Forever". Priest documented a half-dozen instances in which Ellison promised TLDV would appear within a year of the statement, but did not fulfill those promises. Ellison had a record of fulfilling obligations in other instances, including to writers whose stories he solicited, and expressed outrage at other editors who have displayed poor practices. On May 2, 2022, J. Michael Straczynski, the executor of the Ellison estate, announced on Twitter that The Last Dangerous Visions would be published in 2023 by Blackstone Publishers. On Mar 25, 2024, Straczynski announced on Facebook that The Last Dangerous Visions would be available from Amazon on Oct. 1, 2024.
