= The Doll's House (novel) =

2013 book by Tania Carver

- First edition
- Author: Tania Carver
- Audio read by: Martyn Waites
- Language: English
- Subject: Suspense thriller
- Genre: Crime
- Set in: Birmingham
- Published: London
- Publisher: Sphere (Little, Brown)
- Publication date: 2013
- Publication place: United Kingdom
- Pages: 471
- ISBN: 9780751550528

The Doll's House is a 2013 book by British author Tania Carver.

== Synopsis ==
The book centres on the discovery of a dead pre-transition male-to-female transgender individual on a council housing estate in Birmingham. The inside of the house is like a doll's house with pink ribbons and pink walls, stuffed toys and the table set for a tea party. Detective Phil Brennan on the Major Incident Squad begins investigating the puzzling case.

== Reception ==
Author Mark Billingham described the book as "seriously scary." In Female First, the reviewer wrote "This book was full of psychopaths, gory murder scenes and scandal and I loved it. I ended up goading myself to read 'just a few more pages' all the way through." In Mystery Tribune, the book was "recommended for ones looking for psychological thrillers" while the book was also reviewed in Publishers Weekly.
