= List of acronyms: A =

Acronyms that begin with the letter A

This list contains acronyms, initialisms, and pseudo-blends that begin with the letter A.

For the purposes of this list:

- acronym = an abbreviation pronounced as if it were a word, e.g., SARS = severe acute respiratory syndrome, pronounced to rhyme with cars
- initialism = an abbreviation pronounced wholly or partly using the names of its constituent letters, e.g., CD = compact disc, pronounced cee dee
- pseudo-blend = an abbreviation whose extra or omitted letters mean that it cannot stand as a true acronym, initialism, or portmanteau (a word formed by combining two or more words).

(a) = acronym, e.g.: SARS – (a) severe acute respiratory syndrome
(i) = initialism, e.g.: CD – (i) compact disc
(p) = pseudo-blend, e.g.: UNIFEM – (p) United Nations Development Fund for Women
(s) = symbol (none of the above, representing and pronounced as something else; for example: MHz – megahertz)

Some terms are spoken as either acronym or initialism, e.g., VoIP, pronounced both as voyp and V-O-I-P.

(Main list of acronyms)

- a – (s) Atto-
- A – (s) Ampere

== A0–9 ==
- A1C – Airman First Class
- A2ATD or A^{2}ATD – (i) Anti-Armour Advanced Technology Demonstration
- A2C2 or A^{2}C^{2} – (i) Army Airspace Command and Control
- A3 – many, including a European larger than standard office paper size
- A4 – many, including a European standard office paper size; see entry
- A10 – (i) Atlantic 10 Conference

== AA ==
- aa – (s) Afar language (ISO 639-1 code)
- aA – (s) Attoampere
- AA
  - (i) achieved availability
  - Alcoholics Anonymous
  - (s) Armed Forces Americas (postal symbol)
  - Aruba (FIPS 10-4 territory code)
  - (i) assembly area
  - Automobile Association
  - avenue of approach
  - American Airlines
  - Aerolíneas Argentinas
- AAA
  - (i) administration, authorization, and authentication
  - American Automobile Association ("Triple-A")
  - anti-aircraft artillery
  - Amateur Athletic Association (of England)
  - Asistencia Asesoría y Administración (Spanish, "Assistance, Consulting, and Administration" — original name of Mexican professional wrestling promotion Lucha Libre AAA Worldwide)
- AAAI – (i) Association for the Advancement of Artificial Intelligence, formerly American Association for Artificial Intelligence
- AAAS – (i) American Association for the Advancement of Science
- AAAV – (i) Advanced Amphibious Assault Vehicle
- AABN – (i) African Aurora Business Network
- AABP – (i) American Association of Bovine Practitioners
- AAC
  - (i) American Athletic Conference
  - Army Air Corps (British Army)
- AACL – (i) Albanian American Civic League
- AACCS – (i) American Association of Christian Colleges and Seminaries
- AAD
  - (i) analogue-analogue-digital (CD quality)
  - Australian Antarctic Division
- AADHD – Adult attention deficit hyperactivity disorder
- AADT – (i) annual average daily traffic
- AADAC – (a) Alberta Alcohol and Drug Abuse Commission
- AADC
  - (i) area air defense commander
  - (i) amino acid decarboxylase
  - (i) aromatic L-amino acid decarboxylase
  - (i) Australian Antarctic Data Centre
- AAFC
  - (i) U.S. Army Air Corps Ferrying Command (1941–1942)
  - All-America Football Conference (1946–1949)
- AAFES – (i) Army and Air Force Exchange Service
- AAI – (i) applied artificial intelligence
- AAIS – (i) advanced airborne interceptor simulator
- AAM – (i) air-to-air missile
- AAMOF – (i) as a matter of fact
- AAN – (i) American Academy of Nursing
- AANEAS – (a) Anglo-Australian Near-Earth Asteroid Survey
- AAODL – (i) Atmospheric Aerosols and Optics Data Library
- a.a.p. – (i) Associated Artists Productions (former film distributor)
- AAP
  - (i) advanced acquisition plan
  - Allied administrative publication
  - American Academy of Pediatrics
- AAPC – (i) Accounting and Auditing Policy Committee
- aar – (s) Afar language (ISO 639-2 code)
- AAR
  - (i) after-action review
  - Association of American Railroads
- AARP – (i/s) American Association of Retired Persons (now officially known only by the initials)
- AAS
  - (i) Advanced Automation System
  - American Astronomical Society ("double-A-S")
- AASPEM – (i) advanced air-to-air system performance evaluation model
- AAT – (i) Australian Antarctic Territory
- AAV – (i) Amphibious Assault Vehicle
- AAWC – (i) anti-air warfare commander

== AB ==
- ab – (s) Abkhaz language (ISO 639-1 code)
- AB
  - (i) Able Seaman (both the rank and the occupation)
  - (s) Alberta (postal symbol)
- ABA
  - (i) Adriatic Basketball Association
  - American Bar Association
  - American Basketball Association
  - American Beverage Association
  - American Bicycle Association
  - American Birding Association
  - Australian Broadcasting Authority
- ABB – (i) ASEA Brown Boveri (Swiss-Swedish multinational company)
- ABBA – (a) Agnetha, Benny, Björn, Anni-Frid (Swedish pop group)
- ABC
  - (i) abstinence, be faithful, condoms
  - Active Body Control
  - airway, breathing, circulation (see CPR)
  - Alcoholic Beverage Control (or Alcoholic Beverage Commission)
  - alien big cat
  - always be careful
  - American Bird Conservancy
  - American-born Chinese
  - American Broadcasting Company
  - anti-lock brake controller
  - Associated British Cinemas
    - ABC Cinemas
    - ABC Weekend TV (Associated British Cinemas (Television) Ltd / ABC Television Ltd)
  - Associated British Corporation (ABC Television Films Ltd)
  - Atanasoff–Berry Computer
  - Atlantic Baptist College
  - atomic, biological, chemical (see NBC)
  - Australian Broadcasting Corporation
  - already been chewed gum
- ABCA
  - (i) American, British and Canadian Armies (originally)
  - Army Bureau of Current Affairs
- ABCS – (i) (U.S.) Army Battle Command System
- ABET – (a) Accreditation Board for Engineering and Technology
- ABFIST – (i) Advanced Bradley Full Crew Interactive Skills Trainer
- ABGI – (i) Addington-Barker Group International
- ABIN – (a) Agência Brasileira de Inteligência (Brazilian Intelligence Agency)
- abk – (s) Abkhaz language (ISO 639-2 code)
- ABL – (i) American Basketball League
- ABLE
  - (a) Achieving a Better Life Experience Act, a U.S. law that established tax-advantaged accounts for the benefit of individuals with disabilities
  - AirBorne Law Enforcement (police air support unit)
- ABM – (i) anti-ballistic missile – Asynchronous Balanced Mode – automated banking machine
- ABMC – (i) American Battle Monuments Commission
- ABN
  - (i) Australian Business Number (a number issued by the Australian government as registration of a business and used for taxation purposes)
  - Advance Beneficiary Notice of Non-coverage (a form used in health insurance)
- ABPI – (i) Association of the British Pharmaceutical Industry
- ABRSM – (a) Associated Board of the Royal Schools of Music
- ABS
  - (i) acrylonitrile butadiene styrene
  - anti-lock braking system
- ABSA – (a) Amalgamated Banks of South Africa ("ab-sa")
- ABSTRIPS – (p) abstraction-based STRIPS
- ABV – (i) Alcohol by volume
- ABW – (s) Aruba (ISO 3166 trigram)

== AC ==
- aC – (s) Attocoulomb
- Ac – (s) Actinium
- AC
  - (i) Adriamycin-Cyclophosphamide (chemotherapy)
  - Air Conditioning
  - Aircraftman
  - Alternating Current
  - Altocumulus
  - ante Christum (Latin, "before Christ"; see BC)
  - ante cibum (Latin, "before meals")
  - (s) Antigua and Barbuda (FIPS 10-4 country code)
  - (i) Associazione Calcio (Italian, "football (soccer) club")
- A/C – (i) Air Conditioned/Conditioning – Aircraft
- AC1 – Aircraftman 1st Class
- AC2 – Aircraftman 2nd Class
- ACA
  - Affordable Care Act, shorthand for the Patient Protection and Affordable Care Act, commonly called "Obamacare"
  - (i) Airspace Control Authority
  - Airspace Co-ordination Area
  - A Current Affair
- ACAB, short for "All Cops Are Bastards"; used as a political slogan associated with dissidents who are opposed to the police.
- ACARS – (a) Aircraft Communications Addressing and Reporting System
- ACAS
  - (a) Aboriginal Children's Advancement Society
  - Advisory, Conciliation and Arbitration Service
- ACB – (i) Asociación de Clubes de Baloncesto (Spanish for "Association of Basketball Clubs")
- ACC
  - (i) U.S. Air Combat Command
  - Air Component Commander
  - Alpine Club of Canada
  - Altocumulus castellanus
  - Area control center
  - Atlantic Coast Conference
  - Automatic climate control
- ACCA
  - (i) The Association of Chartered Certified Accountants
  - Automatic Cloud Cover Assessment
- ACCAC – (a) Awdurdod Cymwysterau, Cwricwlwm ac Asesu Cymru (Qualifications, Curriculum and Assessment Authority for Wales)
- ACCD – American Coalition of Citizens with Disabilities
- ACCS – (i) Air Communications and Control Squadron
- ACDA – (i) Arms Control & Disarmament Agency
- ACDC
  - (i) Alternating Current Direct Current
  - the name of an Australian rock music band
  - a term for a bisexual person
- A/Cdre – Air Commodore
- ACDT
  - (a) Apple Certified Desktop Technician
  - (a) Australian Central Daylight Time
- ACE
  - (a) Air Combat Emulator (computer game)
  - Allied Command Europe
  - Angiotensin-converting enzyme
  - Armored Combat Earthmover
  - Automatic Computing Engine
- ACE2 – (i/p) Angiotensin-converting enzyme 2 (pronounced "ace-two")
- ACES
  - (a) Aerolíneas Centrales de Colombia (Spanish, "Central Colombian Airlines")
  - Auxiliary Campus Enterprises and Services of Alfred State College
- ACF
  - (i) Administration for Children and Families
  - American Car and Foundry
  - American Culinary Federation
- ACH – (i) Automated clearing house
- ACHT – (i) Average Call Hold Time
- ACID – (a) Atomicity, Consistency, Isolation, and Durability (in databases)
- ACINT – (p) Acoustic Intelligence
- ACK – (p) Acknowledge (telecommunications; cf. NAK)
- ACL
  - (i) Access Control List
  - Anterior cruciate ligament; the initialism can also refer to an injury to this ligament
  - Atlantic Coast Line Railroad
- ACLJ – (i) American Center for Law and Justice
- ACLOS – (i) Automatic CLOS (missile control system)
- ACLS – (i) American Council of Learned Societies
- ACLU
  - (i) American Civil Liberties Union
  - American Communist Lawyers Union (pejorative slang for the above)
- ACM – many, including Association for Computing Machinery; see entry
- ACMC – (i) (U.S.) Assistant Commandant of the Marine Corps
- ACN
  - (i) Airborne Communications Node
  - Australian Company Number (number issued by the Australian government as registration of a limited liability company)
- ACNA
  - (i) Anglican Church in North America
  - (i) ACNA (company) - National Dyes Company and Affiliates
- ACO – (i) Airspace Control Order
- ACOBA – (a) Advisory Committee on Business Appointments
- ACOG
  - (a) Advanced Combat Optical Gunsight
  - (a) American College of Obstetricians and Gynecologists
- ACOM – (p) (U.S.) Atlantic Command
- ACORN – (a) Association of Community Organizations for Reform Now
- ACP
  - (i) African, Caribbean and Pacific Group of States
  - Air Control Point
- ACR – (i) Advanced Concepts and Requirements
- ACRI – (p) African Crisis Response Initiative
- ACRT – (i) Advanced Concepts Research Tool simulator
- ACS
  - (i) Affiliated Computer Services (NYSE ACS)
  - Alaska Communications Service
  - American Cancer Society
  - American Chemical Society
  - Association of Caribbean States
  - Australian Computer Society
- ACSC – (i) Army Command and Staff College (various nations)
- ACST – (i) Australian Central Standard Time
- ACST – (i) American Cooperative School of Tunis
- ACT
  - (i) Adaptive Control of Thought (cognitive model)
  - American College Test (ing Program)
  - Australian Capital Territory (also postal symbol)
- ACT UP – (a) AIDS Coalition to Unleash Power
- ACTD – (i) Advanced Concept Technology Demonstration
- ACTF
  - (i) (U.S.) Army Constructive Training Federation
  - Australian Children's Television Foundation
- ACT-R – (i) ACT-Rational (cognitive model)
- ACT-R/PM – (i) ACT-R/Perceptual-Motor (cognitive model)
- ACTU – (i) Australian Council of Trade Unions
- ACU
  - (i) Abilene Christian University
  - American Conservative Union
- ACUF
  - (i) BGN Advisory Committee on Undersea Features
  - (a) American Conservative Union Foundation
- ACV – (i) Armoured Combat Vehicle

== AD ==
- AD – (i) Air Defence – (s) Andorra (ISO 3166 digram) – (i) Anno Domini (Latin, "In the year of our Lord")
- A/D – (i) Analog/Digital
- ADA
  - (i) Air Defence Artillery
  - American Dental Association
  - Assistant District Attorney
  - Americans with Disabilities Act (see also the similar but non-acronymic Ada programming language)
  - ADA Cryptocurrency token for Cardano blockchain
- ADAC – (a/i) Allgemeiner Deutscher Automobil-Club (German, "General German Automobile Club")
- ADAGE – (a) Air Defense Air to Ground Engagement (simulation)
- ADAP – (i) AIDS Drug Assistance Program
- ADAS – (a/i) Asiago-DLR Asteroid Survey
- ADAT – (i) Alesis Digital Audio Tape (recording format)
- ADatP – (p) Automated Data Processing
- ADATS –
  - (i) Agricultural Development and Training Society
  - Air Defence Anti-Tank System
  - Australian Defence Air Traffic System
- ADB – (i) Asian Development Bank
- ADB- All da best/All the best - texting slang
- ADC –
  - (i) Aide De Camp
  - U.S. Air Defense Command (1946–1992)
  - Analog to Digital Converter
  - Apple Display Connector
- ADCTS – (i) Advanced Distributed Combat Training System
- ADD –
  - (i) Analog Digital Digital (CD quality)
  - Attention-Deficit Disorder
  - Administration on Developmental Disabilities
- ADDIE – (i) Analyze Design Develop Implement and Evaluate
- ADDNS – (i) Advanced Deployable Day/Night Simulation
- ADE
  - (i) Algebraic differential equation
  - Antibody-dependent enhancement
- ADF
  - (i) Australian Defence Force
  - African Development Foundation
- ADGB – Air Defence of Great Britain
- ADHD – (i) Attention-Deficit Hyperactivity Disorder
- ADHS – (i) Attention-Deficit Hyperactivity Syndrome
- ADI – (i) Acceptable/Allowable Daily Intake
- ADIZ – (a/i) Air Defence Identification Zone
- ADL – (i) Anti-Defamation League
- ad loc. – (p) ad locum (Latin, "to/at the place")
- ADM –
  - (i) Administrative
  - (s) Admiral, and the U.S. Public Health Service Commissioned Corps
  - Archer Daniels Midland
  - Assistant Deputy Minister
- ADOA – (a/i) Air Defence Operations Area
- ADP –
  - (i) Adenosine DiPhosphate
  - Army Doctrine Publication (UK, Canada, Australia)
  - Automatic/Automated Data Processing
- ADRG – (p) Arc-second Raster Chart (ARC) Digitized Raster Graphics
- ADS –
  - (a/i) Active Denial System
  - Astrophysics Data System
  - Attention Deficit Syndrome
- ADSR – (i) Attack, Decay, Sustain, Release (sound envelope specification)
- ADT
  - (i) Abu Dhabi Terminals, operator of commercial ports in Abu Dhabi
  - American District Telegraph, a former name of ADT Inc.
  - Atlantic Daylight Time (UTC−3 hours)
- ADTB – (i) Army Doctrine and Training Bulletin
- adv. – (p) adversus (Latin, "against")
- ADW – (i) Air Defence Warning

== AE ==
- ae – (s) Avestan language (ISO 639-1 code)
- AE
  - (s) Armed Forces Africa/Canada/Europe/Middle East (postal symbol)
  - United Arab Emirates (ISO 3166 digram; FIPS 10-4 country code)
  - (i) Artix Entertainment
  - American Eagle
- A&E
  - (a/i) Arts & Entertainment Network, the original name for the U.S. TV channel now known as A&E Network
  - Accident and Emergency
- AEB – Autonomous Emergency Braking, see Collision avoidance system
- AED – (s) United Arab Emirates dirham (ISO 4217 currency code)
- AEDT – (a) Australian Eastern Daylight Time
- AEF – (i) American Expeditionary Force
- AEGIS – (p) Airborne Early warning Ground environment Interface Segment (fake etymology)
- AEI-T – (i) Army Enterprise Infostructure-Transport
- aeq. – (p) aequalis (Latin, "equal")
- AESR – (i) Aeronautical Equipment Service Record
- AEST – (a) Australian Eastern Standard Time
- aet. – (p) aetatis (Latin, "of age", "aged")
- aet – (i) After extra time (Football)
- AEW
  - (i) Air Expeditionary Wing
  - (i) Airborne early warning
  - (i) Airborne electronic warfare
  - (i) All Elite Wrestling (US professional wrestling promotion)

== AF ==
- af – (s) Afrikaans language (ISO 639-1 code)
- aF – (s) Attofarad
- AF
  - (s) Afghanistan (FIPS 10-4 country code; ISO 3166 digram)
  - (i) Air Force
  - As fuck
- AFA
  - (i) U.S. Air Force Academy
  - Asociación del Fútbol Argentino (Spanish, "Argentine Football Association")
- AFAIC – (i) As Far As I'm Concerned
- AFAICT – (i) As Far As I Can Tell
- AFAIK – (i) As Far As I Know
- AFAIR – (i) As Far As I Remember/Recall
- AFAM
  - (i/a) Associazione Friulana di Astronomia e Meteorologia (Italian, "Friuli Association of Astronomy and Meteorology")
  - (p) Department of African and Afro-American Studies, University of North Carolina at Chapel Hill — notable for its links to the school's academic-athletic scandal in the 2010s
- AFATDS – (i) Advanced Field Artillery Tactical Data System
- AFC
  - (i) American Football Conference
  - Approved for construction
  - Asian Football Confederation
- AFCEA – (i) Armed Forces Communications and Electronics Association
- AfD
  - (i) Allianz für Deutschland ("Alliance for Germany"), former political alliance in East Germany
  - Alternative für Deutschland ("Alternative for Germany"), current German political party
- AFD
  - (i) Active Format Description, a technical standard for TV or set-top box decoders
  - Advanced Format Drive, a type of computing storage device
  - Adjustable-frequency drive
  - Adult Film Database, web-based database of adult cinema
  - Agence française de développement ("French Development Agency"), a French international development agency
  - Alliance des forces démocratiques (French; "Alliance of Democratic Forces"), an Ivorian political alliance
  - Alliance for Freedom and Democracy, an Eritrean political party
- AFDB – (i) African Development Bank
- AFES – (i) Automatic Fire Extinguishing System
- AFG – (s) Afghanistan (ISO 3166 trigram)
- AFGAM – (i) Amazon Facebook Google Apple Microsoft
- AFI
  - (s) French Territory of the Afars and Issas (ISO 3166 trigram; obsolete since 1977)
  - (i) "Agencia Federal de Investigaciónes" (México)
  - American Film Institute
  - A Fire Inside, American rock band
- AFIS
  - (a) Automated Fingerprint Identification System
  - American Forces Information Service
- AFIST – (i) Abrams Full Crew Interactive Skills Trainer
- AFJ – (i) April Fool's Joke
- AFK – (i) Away From Keyboard (Internet chat abbreviation)
- AFL
  - (i) American Federation of Labor
  - American Football League — either the 1960s league that merged into the National Football League, or one of several other leagues of American football
  - Arena Football League
  - Australian Football League
- AFL–CIO – (i) American Federation of Labor – Congress of Industrial Organizations
- AFLAC – (a) American Family Life Assurance Company of Columbus
- AFM – (i) Army Field Manual (UK; the U.S. more frequently uses just FM) – Atomic Force Microscope – Aviation Fleet Maintenance
- AFN – (s) Afghani (ISO 4217 currency code)
- AFO – (i) Association of Field Ornithologists
- AFOSR – (i) U.S. Air Force Office of Scientific Research
- AFP
  - (i) Agence France-Presse (French, "French Press Agency")
  - Australian Federal Police
- AFQT – (i) Armed Forces Qualification Test
- afr – (s) Afrikaans language (ISO 639-2 code)
- AFRC – (i) Air Force Reserve Command
- AFRL – (i) Air Force Research Laboratory
- AFROTC – (i) Air Force Reserve Officer Training Corps
- AFRRI – (i, U.S.) Armed Forces Radiobiology Research Institute
- AFRTS – (i) Armed Forces Radio and Television Service
- AFS
  - (i) Active Front Steering
  - Air Facility Sub-System
  - Amniotic Fluid-derived Stem cell
- AFS&A or AFSA – (i) U.S. Air Force Studies and Analysis
- AFSC
  - (i) U.S. Air Force Staff College (obsolete; replaced by JFSC)
  - U.S. Air Force Systems Command
- AFSCN – (i) U.S. Air Force Satellite Control Network
- AFSPC – (i) Air Force Space Command
- AFT – American Farmland Trust
- AFV – (i) armoured fighting vehicle or America's Funniest Home Videos
- AFWA
  - (a) Air Force Weather Agency
  - Association of Fish and Wildlife Agencies

== AG ==
- ag – (s) Attogram
- Ag – (s) Silver (Latin argentum)
- AG
  - (i) air gunner
  - (i) Attorney general
  - Aktiengesellschaft (German, "incorporated")
  - (s) Algeria (FIPS 10-4 country code)
  - Antigua and Barbuda (ISO 3166 digram)
  - Assemblies of God
- AGA
  - (a/i) AB Gas-accumulator ("ah-gah", Swedish company)
  - Advanced Graphics Architecture
- AGARD – (a) Advisory Group for Aerospace Research and Development
- AGARDograph – (p) Advanced Guidance for Alliance Research and Development publication
- AGASA – (a) Akeno Giant Air Shower Array (cosmic ray detector)
- AGB – (i) Internal Nintendo initialism (Advanced Game Boy) for Game Boy Advance
- AGC
  - (i) Apollo Guidance Computer
  - Automatic Gain Control
- AGC – (i) Adjutant General's Corps (British Army)
- AGDC – (i) Australian Game Developers' Conference
- AGI
  - (i) Auxiliary Group Intelligence
  - (i) Artificial General Intelligence
- AGL – (i) Above Ground Level
- AGM – (i) Annual General Meeting
- AGN – (i) Active Galactic Nucleus
- AGO – (s) Angola (ISO 3166 trigram)
- AGP – (i) Accelerated Graphics Port
- AGRICOLA – (a) Agriculture Online Access
- AGS – (i) Alaska Ground Station (LandSat)
- AGTS – (i) Advanced Gunnery Training System
- AGU – (i) American Geophysical Union
- AGW – (i) Autonomous Guided Weapon

== AH ==
- aH – (s) Attohenry
- Ah – (s) Ampere hour
- AH – (i) Attack Helicopter
- AHA – (i) American Heart Association
- AHCPR – (i) Agency for Health Care Policy and Research (obsolete; replaced with AHRQ)
- AHEC – (i) Australian Health Ethics Committee
- AHPCRC – (i) Army High Performance Computing Research Center
- AHQ – Air Headquarters
- AHRQ – (i) Agency for Healthcare Research and Quality
- AHS – (i) American Housing Survey

== AI ==
- AI
  - (i) Air Interdiction
  - Amnesty International
  - Artificial Insemination
  - Artificial Intelligence
  - (s) Anguilla (ISO 3166)
- AIA
  - (i) Aerospace Industries Association
  - American Institute of Architects
  - (s) Anguilla (country code in ISO 3166)
- AIAA – (i) American Institute of Aeronautics and Astronautics
- AIC
  - (i) African Independent Church
  - Animal Identification Coordinator
- AICD – (i) Australian Institute of Company Directors
- AICMFP – (i) And I Claim My Five Pounds
- AID – (i) U.S. Agency for International Development
- AIDS – (a) Acquired Immune Deficiency Syndrome
- AIHW – Australian Institute of Health and Welfare
- AIM – many, including AOL Instant Messenger, Australian Institute of Management; see entry
- AIMP – (i) Aurora Incremental Modernization Project
- AIPAC – (i) American Israel Public Affairs Committee
- AIR – (i) Aircraft Inventory Record
- AIRFA – (a) American Indian Religious Freedom Act
- AIRS – (a/i) Aerometric Information Retrieval System (obsolete; replaced with AFS)
- AIS
  - (i) Australian Institute of Sport
  - Automatic Identification System
- AISB – (i) (British) Society for the Study of Artificial Intelligence and the Simulation of Behaviour

== AJ ==
- aJ – (s) Attojoule
- AJ – (s) Azerbaijan (FIPS 10-4 country code)
- Ajax – (a) Asynchronous JavaScript And XML
- AJD – (i) Astronomical Julian day
- AJP – (i) Allied Joint Publication
- AJPW – (i) All Japan Pro Wrestling

== AK ==
- ak – (s) Akan language (ISO 639-1 code)
- aK – (s) Attokelvin
- AK – (s) Alaska (postal symbol)
- aka – (s) Akan language (ISO 639-2 code)
- AKA
  - (i) Also known as
  - (i) Above knee amputation
- AKDT – (p) Alaska Standard Daylight Saving Time (UTC−8 hours)
- AKST – (p) Alaska Standard Time (UTC−9 hours)
- AKP – (i) Adalet ve Kalkınma Partisi (Turkish, "Justice and Development Party")

== AL ==
- aL – (s) Attolitre
- Al – (s) Aluminium
- AL
  - (s) Alabama (postal symbol)
  - Albania (FIPS 10-4 country code; ISO 3166 digram)
  - (i) Anno Lucis (Latin, "Year of Light", in Masonic tradition, most often seen on plaques bearing the founding dates of buildings, in years AD and years AL)
- ALA – (s) Åland (ISO 3166 trigram)
- ALAP – (a) As Long/Late As Possible
- ALARM – (a) Air-Launched Anti-Radar Missile
- ALB – (s) Albania (ISO 3166 trigram)
- ALCOA or Alcoa – The Aluminum Company of America, NYSE:AA
- ALD – (i) Accounting Line Designator (nuclear weapon targeting)
- ALERT – (a) Advanced Linked Extended Reconnaissance and Targeting – Attack and Launch Early Reporting to Theatre
- ALF
  - (a) Africa Leadership Forum
  - Alien Life Form (cf. ALF (TV series))
  - Animal Liberation Front
- ALG – (s) Algeria (IOC and FIFA trigram, but not ISO 3166)
- ALGOL – (p) ALGOrithmic Language
- ALL – (s) Albanian lek (ISO 4217 currency code)
- ALOA – (i) Associated Locksmiths of America, Inc.
- ALOC
  - (a) Air Lines Of Communication
  - (a) Average Length of Calls
- ALP – (i) Australian Labor Party
- ALPA – (a) Air Line Pilots Association
- ALS – (i) Amyotrophic Lateral Sclerosis – Automatic Landing System
- ALSHS – (a) Abraham Low Self-Help Systems
- ALSP – (i) Aggregate Level Simulation Protocol
- ALTA – American Land Title Association
- ALTE – (a) Association of Language Testers in Europe
- ALTACS – (p) Automated decision Logic Tactical Air Combat Simulation

== AM ==
- am
  - (s) Amharic language (ISO 639-1 code)
  - Attometre
- Am – (s) Americium
- AM
  - many, including amplitude modulation and ante meridiem; see entry
  - (s) Armenia (FIPS 10-4 country code; ISO 3166 digram)
- AM1 – Airman 1st class
- AMA
  - (i) American Medical Association
  - Australian Medical Association
- AMAPS – (a) Aircraft, Missile, Avionics Performance Simulation
- AMC
  - (i) Adaptive modulation and coding (digital communications)
  - U.S. Air Mobility Command
  - American Motors Corporation
  - American Movie Classics (TV network; now known simply by the initials)
  - U.S. Army Materiel Command
  - (i) American Multi Cinema
- AMCB – (i) U.S. Army/Marine Corps Board
- AMD
  - (i) Advanced Micro Devices
  - Age-related Macular Degeneration
  - (s) Armenian dram (ISO 4217 currency code)
- AmE – American English
- AMF – (i) Afghan Military Force(s)
- AMFOM – (i) Advanced Missile Fly Out Model ("am-fomm")
- AMFR
  - (i) Age-specific Marital Fertility Rate
  - Amplitude Modulation Following Response
- AMFRS
  - (i) Advanced Multi-Function Radio Frequency System
  - Automatic Multisensor Feature-based Recognition System
- amh – (s) Amharic language (ISO 639-2 code)
- AML – (i) Acute Myeloid Leukaemia
- AMLCD – (i) Active Matrix Liquid Crystal Display
- AMLO
  - (i) Andrés Manuel López Obrador (Mexican politician)
  - Anti-Money Laundering Office — separate government agencies in Taiwan and Thailand
- AMO – (i) Atlantic Multidecadal Oscillation
- AMOLED – (i) Active-matrix organic light-emitting diode
- AMOS
  - (a) Advanced MOrtar System
  - Air Force Maui Optical and Supercomputing observatory
- AMP
  - (i) Adenosine MonoPhosphate
  - (i) Antimicrobial peptide
  - Automated Mission Planner
  - Anak ng Puta
  - (i) Ain't My Problem
- AMRAAM – (a) Advanced Medium-Range Air-to-Air Missile
- AMRDEC – (i) U.S. Aviation & Missile Research, Development, & Engineering Center
- AMS
  - (i) Agriculture Marketing Service
  - American Mathematical Society
- AMSAA – (i/a) U.S. Army Materiel Systems Analysis Activity
- AMSB – (i) Aix Maurienne Savoie Basket (French basketball club)
- AMSO – (i/a) U.S. Army Model and Simulation Office
- AMSU – Advanced Microwave Sounding Unit
- AMTE – (i) UK Admiralty Marine Technology Establishment (1977–1984)

== AN ==
- an – (s) Aragonese language (ISO 639-1 code)
- aN – (s) Attonewton
- AN
  - (s) Andorra (FIPS 10-4 country code)
  - Netherlands Antilles (ISO 3166 digram)
- ANA
  - (i) Administration for Native Americans
  - Afghan National Army
  - All Nippon Airways
  - Anti-Nuclear Anti-body
  - (a) Australian National Airways
  - Australian Natives' Association
- ANC – (i) African National Congress
- AND – (s) Andorra (ISO 3166 trigram)
- ANFO – (i) Ammonium nitrate/fuel oil (explosive)
- ANG
  - (i) Air National Guard
  - (s) Angola (IOC and FIFA trigram, but not ISO 3166)
  - (s) Netherlands Antillian guilder (ISO 4217 currency code)
- ANGLiCo – (p) Air/Naval Gunfire Liaison Company
- ANL – (i) Argonne National Laboratory
- ANM – (i) Acoustic Noise Monitor
- ANOVA – (p) ANalysis Of VAriance
- ANS – (i) Applied and Natural Sciences
- ANSI – (a) American National Standards Institute
- ANTM – (i) America's Next Top Model
- ANT
  - (s) Netherlands Antilles (ISO 3166 trigram)
  - Antigua and Barbuda (IOC trigram, but not ISO 3166 or FIFA)
- ANTY – Acronyms, No Thank You
- ANWA – (i) Augusta National Women's Amateur, a prominent American golf tournament
- ANWR – (i) Arctic National Wildlife Refuge /ˈænwɑːr/
- ANZ – (s) Australia and New Zealand Banking Group
- ANZAC – (a) Australian and New Zealand Army Corps

== AO ==
- AO
  - (s) Angola (FIPS 10-4 country code; ISO 3166 digram)
  - (i) Approach Officer (submarine)
  - Area of Operations
- AOA
  - (i) Air Officer in charge of Administration
  - Argonne National Laboratory
  - (s) Angolan kwanza (ISO 4217 currency code)
  - (i) Award of Arms (heraldry)
  - Angle of Attack (fluid dynamics)
- AOC
  - (i) Air Operations Centre
  - Air Officer Commanding
  - Alexandria Ocasio-Cortez (American politician)
- AOC in C – Air Officer Commanding in Chief
- AOD – (i) Adrenalin O.D. (punk rock band)
- AOE – Area of Effect
- AOI
  - (i) Angle of Incidence
  - Arab Organization for Industrialization
- AOL – (i) America OnLine
- AOR – (i) Area of Responsibility
- AOSTH – (i) Adventures of Sonic the Hedgehog
- AOTS – (i) Attack of the Show!
- AOU – (i) American Ornithologists' Union

== AP ==
- AP
  - (i) Advanced Placement
  - Air Publication
  - (s) Andhra Pradesh (Indian state code)
  - (s) Armed Forces Pacific (postal symbol)
  - (i) Associated Press
  - Auto Pilot
- APA
  - (i) Acolytes Protection Agency (professional wrestling tag team)
  - American Psychiatric Association
  - American Psychological Association (see also APA style, a writing format developed by this body)
- APB – (i) All Points Bulletin (police jargon)
- APC
  - (i) Armoured Personnel Carrier
  - Armour Piercing Capped (ammunition)
- APEC – (a) Asia Pacific Economic Cooperation
- APCNR – (i) Armour-Piercing, Composite Non-Rigid (ammunition)
- APCR – (i) Armour-Piercing, Composite Rigid (ammunition)
- APDS – (i) Armour-Piercing, Discarding-Sabot (ammunition)
- APEDS – (a) AMSAA Performance Estimates Data System
- APEX – (p) Applied Physics Express
- APFSDS – (i) Armour-Piercing, Fin-Stabilised, Discarding Sabot (ammunition)
- APHA – (i) American Public Health Association
- APHE – (i) Armour-Piercing, High Explosive (ammunition)
- APHIS – (a) Animal and Plant Health Inspection Service
- API – (i) Application Programming Interface
- APL
  - (i) A Programming Language
  - Acute Promyeloid Leukaemia
  - Anti-Personnel Landmine
  - Applied Physics Laboratory (Johns Hopkins University)
- APM
  - (i) Advanced Power Management
  - Actions Per Minute
- APNP – Advanced Practice Nurse Prescriber
- APOD – (i) Aerial Port (Airport) Of Debarkation
- APOE – (i) Aerial Port (Airport) Of Embarkation
- APOLLO – (a) Apache Point Observatory Lunar Laser-ranging Operation
- APP – (i) Allied Procedural Publication
- APR – (i) Annual Percentage Rate
- APS
  - (i) Advanced Photo System (cf. APS-C, an image sensor format based on the size of the original APS film frame)
  - American Physical Society
  - Antiphospholipid Antibody Syndrome
  - Active Protection System

== AQ ==
- AQ
  - (i) AdventureQuest
  - (s) American Samoa (FIPS 10-4 territory code)
  - Antarctica (ISO 3166 digram)
  - (i) Automatic qualifier, a term used by U.S. sports media from 1998 to 2013 to refer to the six conferences whose champions automatically entered the now-defunct Bowl Championship Series of college football
- AQIM – (i) Al-Qaeda in the Islamic Maghreb
- AQPS – (i) Autre que pur-sang (French: "Other than Thoroughbred"), designation of a type of French racehorse

== AR ==
- ar – (s) Arabic language (ISO 639-1 code)
- Ar – (s) Argon
- AR
  - (s) Argentina (FIPS 10-4 country code; ISO 3166 digram)
  - Arkansas (postal symbol)
  - (i) ArmaLite Rifle (cf. ArmaLite AR-15 and AR-15 style rifle, both also referred to with the "AR" initialism)
  - Armour
  - (s) Arunachal Pradesh (Indian state code)
- ara – (s) Arabic language (ISO 639-2 code)
- ARAG – (a) Advanced Research and Assessment Group
- ARB – (i) Administrative Review Board
- ARBA – (a/i) Army Review Boards Agency
- ARC
  - (i) Appalachian Regional Commission
  - Arc-second Raster Chart
  - (a) Association of Retarded Citizens, the original name of the organization now known as Arc of the United States
  - (i) Athletics–Recreation Center, an indoor arena at Valparaiso University
- ARCA – (a) Automobile Racing Club of America
- ARCENT – (p) United States Army Central Command
- ARDA – (a) Advanced Research and Development Activity (became DTO 2006)
- ARE
  - (i) UK Admiralty Research Establishment (1984–1991)
  - (s) United Arab Emirates (ISO 3166 trigram)
- ARF – (i) ASEAN Regional Forum
- ARG
  - (s) Argentina (ISO 3166 trigram)
  - (s) Aragonese language (ISO 639-2 code)
  - (i) Alternate Reality Game
- ARH – (s) Armed Reconnaissance Helicopter
- ARI
  - (i) Acute Respiratory Infection
  - U.S. Army Research Institute for the Behavioral and Social Sciences
- ARL
  - (i) UK Admiralty Research Laboratory (1921–1977)
  - U.S. Army Research Laboratory
  - UIUC Aviation Research Laboratory
- ARM
  - (a) Acorn RISC Machine, later Advanced RISC Machine (cf. Arm Ltd.)
  - Anti-Radiation Missile
  - Adjustable-rate mortgage
  - (s) Armenia (ISO 3166 trigram)
- ARNet – (p) Acquisition Reform Network
- AROTS – Australian Rare Or Threatened Species
- ARP – (i) Address Resolution Protocol – Applied Research Programme
- ARPA – (a) Advanced Research Projects Agency
- ARRC – (i) ACE Rapid Reaction Corps
- ARRF – (i) Allied Rapid Reaction Force
- ARRL – (i) American Radio Relay League
- ARS
  - (i) Agricultural Research Service
  - (s) Argentine peso (ISO 4217 currency code)
- ARSC – (i) Arctic Region Supercomputing Center
- ARSPACE – (p) U.S. Army Space Command
- ART
  - (a) Adaptive Resonance Theory
  - Anti-Retroviral Therapy
- ARTCC – (i) Air Route Traffic Control Center
- ARWG – (i) Army Research Working Group ("are-wig")

== AS ==
- as
  - (i) Adult Swim
  - (s) Assamese language (ISO 639-1 code)
  - Attosecond
- aS – (s) Attosiemens
- As – (s) Arsenic
- AS
  - (s) American Samoa (postal symbol; ISO 3166 digram)
  - Australia (FIPS 10-4 country code)
  - Assam / Asom (Indian state code)
  - Advanced Subsidiary (Subsidiary version of Advanced Level, 'A'-Level)
- AS – (i) ActionScript
- A/S – (i) Anti-submarine
- A&S – (i) Armament & Standardisation
- ASA
  - (i) AcetylSalicylic Acid
  - American Standards Association
  - Army Security Agency
  - Atlantic Southeast Airlines
  - Alaska Airlines (ICAO code)
- ASAP – (a) As Soon As Possible
- ASARS
  - (a) Advanced Synthetic Aperture Radar System
  - Airborne Search and Rescue System
- ASB – (i) Associated Student Body – Alternative Service Book (Church of England)
- asbl – (i) association sans but lucratif (French "Non-profit organisation")
- ASBO – (a) Antisocial Behavior Order
- ASC - (i) American Society of Cinematographers
- ASCAP – (a) American Society of Composers, Authors, and Publishers
- ASCC
  - (i) Army Service Component Commander
  - Automatic Sequence Controlled Calculator
  - Air Standardization Coordinating Committee
- ASCIET – (i) All Services Combat Identification Evaluation Team
- ASCII – (a) American Standard Code for Information Interchange
- ASC+T – (i) Anti Slip Control + Traction
- ASD
  - (i) (U.S.) Assistant Secretary of Defense
  - Autism spectrum disorder
- ASD(C3I) – (i) (U.S.) (Command, Control, Communications, & Intelligence)
- ASD(FMP) – (i) (U.S.) Assistant Secretary of Defense (Force Management Policy)
- ASD(HA) – (i) (U.S.) Assistant Secretary of Defense (Health Affairs)
- ASD(ISA) – (i) (U.S.) Assistant Secretary of Defense (International Security Affairs)
- ASD(ISP) – (i) (U.S.) Assistant Secretary of Defense (International Security Policy)
- ASD(LA) – (i) (U.S.) Assistant Secretary of Defense (Legislative Affairs)
- ASD(PA) – (i) (U.S.) Assistant Secretary of Defense (Public Affairs)
- ASD(RA) – (i) (U.S.) Assistant Secretary of Defense (Reserve Affairs)
- ASD(SO&HA) – (i) (U.S.) Assistant Secretary of Defense (Special Operations & Humanitarian Assistance)
- ASD(SO/LIC) – (i) (U.S.) (Special Operations & Low-Intensity Conflict)
- ASD(S&R) – (i) (U.S.) Assistant Secretary of Defense (Strategy & Requirements)
- ASD(S&TR) – (i) (U.S.) Assistant Secretary of Defense (Strategy & Threat Reduction)
- ASDIC – (a) Allied Submarine Detection Investigation Committee (Sonar)
- ASEAN – (a) Association of Southeast Asian Nations
- ASFAR – (a) Americans for a Society Free of Age Restrictions
- ASG – (i) Area Support Group
- ASIC – (a) Australian Securities & Investments Commission – (a) Aviation Security Identification Card
- ASICS – (a) Anima sana in corpore sano (Latin, "A sound mind in a sound body") (athletic shoe manufacturer)
- ASIO
  - (a) Australian Security Intelligence Organisation
  - Audio Stream Input/Output
- ASIP
  - (i) Advanced System Improvement Program
  - Army Stationing and Installation Plan
  - Application-specific instruction set processor
- ASL
  - (i) Above Sea Level
  - American Sign Language (also known as Ameslan)
  - "Age, Sex, Location?" (Internet slang)
- asm – (s) Assamese language (ISO 639-2 code)
- ASM
  - (i) Air-to-Surface Missile
  - (s) American Samoa (ISO 3166 trigram)
  - (i) American Society for Metals
  - American Society for Microbiology
  - Association Sportive Montferrandaise (French, "Clermont-Ferrand Sporting Association"), as in ASM Clermont Auvergne
- ASMB
  - (i) American Society for Matrix Biology
  - Adult Swim Message Board
- ASME
  - (i) American Society of Mechanical Engineers
  - American Society of Magazine Editors
- ASMP
  - (i) Air-Sol Moyenne Portée missile (French "Medium-range air to surface")
  - (p) Asymmetric multiprocessing
- ASMR – Autonomous Sensory Meridian Response
- ASN – (i) Associate of Science in Nursing
- ASOC
  - (a/i) Air Sovereignty Operations Centre
  - Air Support Operations Centre
  - Airport Security and Operations Centre
  - Antarctic and Southern Ocean Coalition
  - Atlanta Symphony Orchestra Chorus
  - Australian Standard Offence Classification
- ASP
  - (i) Active Server Pages
  - American Society of Primatologists
  - Ammunition Supply Point
  - Application Service Provider (cf internet service provider)
  - Astronomical Society of the Pacific
  - Association of Surfing Professionals
- ASPI – (i) Australian Strategic Policy Institute
- ASR
  - (i) Alkali-silica reaction
  - Anti Slip Regulation
- ASRAAM – (a) Advanced Short-Range Air-to-Air Missile
- ASSC – (i) Association for the Scientific Study of Consciousness
- Ass Paym – Assistant Paymaster
- AST – (i) Atlantic Standard Time (UTC−4 hours)
- ASTIA – (a) Armed Services Technical Information Agency
- ASTM – (i) American Society for Testing and Materials
- ASTREA – (a) Aerial Support To Regional Enforcement Agencies (sheriff's air support unit)
- ASUN – (p) Atlantic Sun Conference, now branded as the ASUN Conference (pronounced "A-sun")
- ASUW – (p) AntiSUrface Warfare
- ASVAB–Armed Services Vocational Aptitude Battery (taken by juniors in high school in the USA)
- ASVEL – (a) Association Sportive Villeurbanne Éveil Lyonnais (Association Sportive is French for "Sporting Association"; the club was founded through the merger of AS Villeurbanne and Éveil Lyonnais)
- ASW – (i) AntiSubmarine Warfare
- ASWORG – (i) (U.S.) AntiSubmarine Warfare Operations Research Group
- ASX
  - (p) Advanced Stream Redirector
  - Australian Securities Exchange

== AT ==
- aT – (s) Attotesla
- At – (s) Astatine
- AT – (i) Anti-Tank – (s) Ashmore and Cartier Islands (FIPS 10-4 territory code) – Austria (ISO 3166 digram) – (i) Advanced Technology (IBM Personal Computer/AT)
- ATA – (i) Advanced Technology Attachment (IBM Personal Computer) – Afghan Transitional Authority – Allen Telescope Array – (s) Antarctica (ISO 3166 trigram)
- ATAC – (a) Air Transportable Acoustic Communications
- ATACMS – (p) Army TACtical Missile System
- ATAPI – (a) Advanced Technology Attachment Packet Interface
- ATAS – (a) Air-To-Air Stinger (missile)
- ATAT – (a) Aiken Tactical Airsoft Team / Star Wars vehicle
- ATB
  - (i) Active Time Battle
  - (s) British Antarctic Territory (ISO 3166 trigram; merged with AQ in 1979)
- ATC –
  - (i) Air Traffic Control
  - Air Training Corps
  - U.S. Air Transport Command (1942–1948)
  - Athletic Trainer, Certified (www.nata.org)
- ATCCIS – (i) Army Tactical Command and Control Information System
- ATEBAWLS – (a) Association Towards Engineers Balling at Wii Lover's Sports
- ATESS – (i) Aerospace and Telecommunications Engineering Support Squadron
- ATF
  - (s) French Southern Territories (ISO 3166 trigram)
  - (i) (U.S.) Bureau of Alcohol, Tobacco, Firearms and Explosives (from its previous name, which did not include "Explosives")
- ATG – (s) Antigua and Barbuda (ISO 3166 and FIFA trigram)
- ATGM – (i) Anti-Tank Guided Missile
- ATGW – (i) Anti-Tank Guided Weapon
- ATI –
  - (i) Allied Telesyn International, Inc.
  - (a) Array Technologies Incorporated. (ATI Technologies)
  - Air Transport International - American cargo airline
- Atisbo – a Local Government Area in Nigeria named for constituent communities (Ago-Are, Tede, Irawo, Sabe, Baasi, Ofiki and Owo)
- ATK – (p) Attack
- ATL – (p) Atlanta, Georgia, the largest city and capital of Georgia; taken from the IATA code for its airport
- ATLAS –
  - (a) All-Terrain Lifter Army System
  - (p) Assessment Tool for LAnd Systems
- ATM –
  - (i) Automated Teller Machine
  - Asynchronous Transfer Mode
  - At The Moment
- ATN – (s) Dronning Maud Land (ISO 3166 trigram; merged with AQ in 1983)
- ATO
  - (i) Air Tasking Order
  - Australian Taxation Office
- ATP
  - (i) Adenosine TriPhosphate
  - Allied Tactical Publication
  - Ammunition Transfer Point
  - Association of Tennis Professionals (cf. ATP Tour, ATP Challenger Tour, ATP Champions Tour)
  - At This Point
- ATSD – (p) (U.S.) Assistant Secretary of Defense
- ATSDR – (i) Agency for Toxic Substances and Disease Registry
- AT&T – (i) American Telephone and Telegraph (U.S. company, also known as "Ma Bell")
- ATV
  - (i) All-terrain vehicle
  - Associated Television – former UK TV company
- ATWA – (a) Air, Trees, Water, Animals

== AU ==
- Au – (s) Gold (Latin Aurum)
- AU –
  - (i) African Union (was OAU before 2000)
  - American University
  - (s) Astronomical Unit
  - Australia (ISO 3166 diagram)
  - Austria (FIPS 10-4 country code)
- AUC –
  - (i) Ab Urbe Condita / Anno Urbis Conditae (Latin "from the founding of the city" / "in the year since the founding of the city") (of Rome)
  - Area Under the Curve (concentration time curve; medicine)
- AUD – (s) Australian dollar (ISO 4217 currency code)
- AUG – (a) Armee-Universal-Gewehr (German, Army Universal Rifle)
- AUS – (s) Australia (ISO 3166 trigram)
- AUSCANNZUKUS – (p) Australia, Canada, New Zealand, United Kingdom, United States (security designation)
- Auslan – (p) Australian Sign Language
- AUT – (s) Austria (ISO 3166 trigram)
- AUTL – (i) Army Universal Task List

== AV ==
- av – (s) Avar language (ISO 639-1 code)
- aV – (s) Attovolt
- Av – (i) Aperture value (photographic mode)
- AV
  - (s) Anguilla (FIPS 10-4 territory code)
  - (i) Audio-Visual
  - (s) Aviation
- ava – (s) Avar language (ISO 639-2 code)
- AVA – (i) American Viticultural Area
- AVB – (i) Audio Video Bridging
- AVCATT-A – (p) (U.S. Army's) Aviation Combed Arms Tactical Trainer-Aviation [Reconfigurable Manned Simulator]
- AVDLR – (p) Aviation Depot Level Repair
- ave – (s) Avestan language (ISO 639-2 code)
- AVGP – (i) Armoured Vehicle, General Purpose
- AVI – (i) Audio Video Interleave
- AVIM – (p) Aviation Intermediate Maintenance
- AVLB – (i) Armoured Vehicle Launched Body
- AVM
  - (i) Air Vice-Marshal
  - (p) Arteriovenous malformation
- AVO – (i) Apprehended Violence Order
- AVP – (a) Arubaanse Volkspartij
- AVP – (i) Association of Volleyball Professionals
- AVRE – (i) Armoured Vehicle Royal Engineers
- AVTB
  - (i) Armoured Vehicle Test Bed
  - (p) Aviation Test Bed
- AVUM – (p) Aviation Unit Maintenance
- AVUS – (a) Automobil-Verkehrs- und Übungsstraße (German, "Automobile Traffic and Training Road"; former auto racing track and current road in Berlin)
- AVVO – (a) Acute Vaginal Venereal Outbreak

== AW ==
- aW – (s) Attowatt
- AW – (s) Aruba (ISO 3166 digram)
- AWA – (i) American Wrestling Association
- AWACS – (a) Airborne Warning And Control System
- AWC – (i) Air Warfare Centre
- AWD – many, including All Wheel Drive; see entry
- AWE – (i/a) Advanced Warfighting Experiment
- AWG – (s) Aruban guilder (ISO 4217 currency code)
- AWOL – (a) Absent Without Official Leave / Absent WithOut Leave (military jargon)
- AWP – (p) Awaiting Parts (SM&R code)
- AWSIM – (p) Air Warfare SIMulation
- AWST – (a) Australian Western Standard Time
- AWW – (i) Above-Water Warfare

== AX ==
- AX – (s) Åland (ISO 3166 digram)
- AXP – (p) Ambulance eXchange Point

== AY ==
- ay – (s) Aymara language (ISO 639-1 code)
- AY – (s) Antarctica (FIPS 10-4 territory code)
- AYBABTU – (i) All Your Base Are Belong To Us
- aym – (s) Aymara language (ISO 639-2 code)
- AYU – (i) As Yet Unknown

== AZ ==
- az – (s) Azerbaijani language (ISO 639-1 code)
- AZ
  - (s) Arizona (postal symbol)
  - Azerbaijan (ISO 3166 digram)
  - (i) Alkmaar Zaanstreek (Dutch football club)
- AZAL – Azerbaijan Airlines
- aze – (s) Azerbaijani language (ISO 639-2 code)
- AZE – (s) Azerbaijan (ISO 3166 trigram)
- AZN – (s) Azerbaijani manat (ISO 4217 currency code)
- AZUR – (p) Actions en zone urbaine (French, Urban Operations)
