= AEF =

AEF may refer to:

- Aboriginal Evangelical Fellowship, Australia
- Adelaide Equestrian Festival, an annual equestrian event in Adelaide, South Australia
- Afrique Équatoriale Française or French Equatorial Africa
- Agricultural Industry Electronics Foundation
- Air Experience Flight
- Allied Expeditionary Force in World War II
- American Eagle Foundation
- American Expeditionary Forces, in World War I
- Asia Education Foundation
- Asian Pacific American Bar Association Educational Fund
- Association de l'enseignement français
- Astana Economic Forum
- Aviation Environment Federation
