= AFES =

AFES may refer to:

- Alaska Agricultural and Forestry Experiment Station
- Australian Fellowship of Evangelical Students
- Automatic fire extinguishing system
