= ARAG =

ARAG may refer to:

- ARAG (region), a group of ports in Antwerp, Rotterdam, Amsterdam, and Ghent
- Arag, a town in Sangli district in the Indian state of Maharashtra
- Advanced Research and Assessment Group
- ARAG SE European Insurance Group
- ARAG-Tower Düsseldorf
- ARAG ATP World Team Championship
