= AGDC =

AGDC may refer to:

- Alaska Gasline Development Corp
- Alaska Geographic Data Committee
- Alaska Geospatial Data Clearinghouse
- Advanced General Dentistry Clinic
- Australian Game Developers Conference
- Australian Geoscience Data Cube
