= AFDB =

AFDB may refer to:

- Adult Film Database
- African Development Bank
- Aluminum Foil Deflector Beanie (Tin foil hat)
- Large Auxiliary Floating Dry Docks, Big
