= Conflict Studies Research Centre =

College of the Defence Academy of the UK

- "Star and Acorn" logo
- Type: Military college
- Established: 1972
- Principal: Keir Giles
- Location: Shrivenham
- Website: conflictstudies.org.uk

The Conflict Studies Research Centre (CSRC) is an independent military and international relations research company based in Shrivenham, Oxfordshire in the United Kingdom. Founded in 1972, it was originally a component of the British Ministry of Defence Defence Academy of the United Kingdom, specialising in potential causes of conflict in a wide area ranging from the Baltics to Central Asia.

This geographical focus was inherited from the Centre's original incarnation as the Soviet Studies Research Centre (SSRC) in 1972, at Royal Military Academy Sandhurst, examining the Soviet military threat. SSRC was an original red team which interpreted Soviet bloc "thinking and attitudes" at Camberley. The organization was renamed from Soviet studies to Conflict studies in 1993 – after the dissolution of the Soviet Union. The Centre later examined wider issues including foreign policy, energy security and demographic change.

CSRC hosted a small number of deep country specialists, providing in-house expertise on their subject countries to government and academic customers in the UK and beyond, as well as publishing research in their own right.

In 2006, CSRC was absorbed into the Advanced Research and Assessment Group (ARAG), another component of the UK Defence Academy. In 2010 the ARAG was disbanded and former research staff of the CSRC, laid off at its closure, re-formed the organisation independently of the Ministry of Defence. CSRC is now an independent, privately funded body providing expertise in security issues with a primary focus on relations with Russia, and specialist knowledge on military, domestic political, and cyber security questions.
