= AABN =

AABN or AABn may refer to:

- Anti-Apartheid Beweging Nederland, a Dutch anti-apartheid movement that was active in the 1960s
- African Aurora Business Network, an African enterprise development NGO
- Several military units of the US Marine Corps:
  - 2nd Assault Amphibian Battalion
  - 3rd Assault Amphibian Battalion
  - 4th Assault Amphibian Battalion
- Assault Armor Battalion, a military unit of the Philippine Marine Corps
