= ALTE =

ALTE or alte may refer to:

== Places ==
- Alte, village in Portugal
- Alte River, river in Portugal

== Other uses ==
- Apparent life-threatening events
- Association of Language Testers in Europe

== See also ==
- Der Alte (disambiguation)
- Alter (disambiguation)
