= ARF =

ARF may refer to:

== Organizations ==
- Advertising Research Foundation
- Animal Rescue Foundation
- Armenian Revolutionary Federation
- ASEAN Regional Forum

== People ==
- Cahit Arf (1910–1997), Turkish mathematician

== Science, medicine, and mathematics ==
- Acute renal failure
- Acute rheumatic fever
- ADP ribosylation factor, a small GTP-binding protein
- The Arf invariant in mathematics
- Argon fluoride laser or ArF laser
- Atomic Resonance Filter or atomic line filter
- Auxin Response Factors in plants
- p14arf or ARF tumor suppressor

== Other uses ==
- Arf (Nanoha), character in Magical Girl Lyrical Nanoha
- Abuse Reporting Format
- Almost-Ready-to-Fly model aircraft
- The Azkena Rock Festival, Vitoria-Gasteiz, Spain
