= AEW (disambiguation) =

All Elite Wrestling is an American professional wrestling promotion founded in 2019.

AEW or aew may also refer to:

- Airborne early warning, airborne radar system for detecting aircraft
- Aerosvit Airlines, an airline based in Kyiv, Ukraine (ICAO airline designator: AEW)
- AEW Capital Management, a property investment management company
- Air Expeditionary Wing, a US Air Force unit
- Ambakich language (ISO 639-3 code: aew)
- Association for the Education of Women, an organisation at the University of Oxford from 1878 to 1920
