= ANZ =

ANZ may refer to:

== Banks ==
- ANZ (bank), Australia and New Zealand Banking Group Limited, the fourth-largest bank in Australia
  - ANZ Bank New Zealand, the largest bank in New Zealand
  - ANZ Fiji, one of the largest banks in Fiji
  - ANZ Royal Bank, a bank in Cambodia
  - ANZ Amerika Samoa Bank, a bank in American Samoa
- ANZ Bank Building (Fremantle)
- ANZ Bank Centre, the tenth tallest building in Sydney
- Trustees Chambers, a heritage-listed bank building in Brisbane, Queensland, Australia, once known as an ANZ Bank building

== People ==
- Anz (musician), a British DJ and electronic musician

== Sports ==
- AFL New Zealand, the governing body of Australian rules football in New Zealand
- ANZ Championship (golf)
- ANZ Tasmanian International (tennis)
- Archery New Zealand, the national governing body for the sport of Archery in New Zealand
- Athletics New Zealand, the national organisation for athletics in New Zealand
- Australasia at the Olympics, the combined team of Australia and New Zealand in 1908 and 1912
- Queensland Sport and Athletics Centre, known as ANZ Stadium from 1993 to 2003
- Stadium Australia, known as ANZ Stadium from 2008 to 2020

== Transportation ==
- Air New Zealand, airline's ICAO code
- Airways New Zealand, the sole Air Traffic Service provider in New Zealand
- Anerley railway station (London), from its UK National Rail code

== Other uses ==
- Academic ranks (Australia and New Zealand)
- Animal Planet (Australia and New Zealand)
- Antarctica New Zealand, an Institute that manages New Zealand's interests in Antarctica and the Ross Sea
- ANZ Centre, a skyscraper in Auckland, New Zealand
