= Asian Pacific American Bar Association Educational Fund =

Non-profitable organization

The Asian Pacific American Bar Association Educational Fund (AEF) is a non-profit organization established by the Asian Pacific American Bar Association of the Greater Washington, D.C. Area, Inc. (APABA-DC) in 1993 to engage exclusively in charitable and educational activities. In 2005, AEF established the Robert T. Matsui Annual Writing Competition.
