= AMF =

AMF may refer to:

== Organizations ==
- Against Malaria Foundation, a charity that raises funds for mosquito bednets
- American Machine and Foundry, a recreational equipment supplier
  - AMF Bowling
- African Minifootball Federation
- Arab Minifootball Federation
- Ameriflight, an airline with ICAO code AMF
- Arab Monetary Fund
- Asociación Mundial de Fútbol de Salón (World Futsal Association), an international futsal governing body
- Association for the Protection of Mixed Families' Rights
- Australian Military Forces, former name of the Army of Australia (1916–1980)
- Autorité des marchés financiers (France), French financial regulatory agency
- Autorité des marchés financiers (Québec), Canadian province of Quebec financial regulatory agency
- Hollywood Bowl Group, bowling centre operator formerly known as AMF Bowling UK
- Swedish Amphibious Corps (Amfibiekåren)

== Science and technology ==
- Action Message Format, a protocol for object remoting
- Additive Manufacturing File Format, a protocol for 3D printing
- Advanced Media Framework, AMD's video acceleration technologies including Unified Video Decoder and Video Coding Engine
- Antimatter Factory, a particle physics facility
- Arbuscular mycorrhizal fungi, a fungus symbiotic on vascular plant roots

== Other uses ==
- Adios Motherfucker, a variant of the Long Island iced tea cocktail
- Amsterdam Music Festival, an EDM event originating in the Netherlands
- Ammanford railway station, National Rail code
- Ama Airport in Ama, Papua New Guinea, IATA code AMF
