= Astia (disambiguation) =

Astia or ASTIA may refer to:

- Astia, a genus of jumping spiders
- Astia (film), Fujichrome Astia professional color reversal films by Fujifilm
- Astia Walker, (born 1975), a Jamaican runner
- Astia, new name for the Women's Technology Cluster, a women's organization in San Francisco
- The Armed Services Technical Information Agency, former name of the Defense Technical Information Center
