= ARH =

ARH may refer to:

- Active radar homing, a missile guidance method
- Arkhangelsk Airport, IATA code
- The ARH gene
- Armed Reconnaissance Helicopter
- A US Navy hull classification symbol: Heavy-hull repair ship (ARH)
