= AWST =

AWST may refer to:

- Australian Western Standard Time, a time zone (UTC+8:00)
- Aviation Week & Space Technology, a magazine
