= Afam =

Afam or AFAM may refer to:

- Afam, Rivers State, Nigeria
- Afam Akram, a Sri Lankan international footballer
- Air Force Achievement Medal, a US military decoration
- American Folk Art Museum, New York City, NY
- Associazione Friulana di Astronomia e Meteorologia, an Italian society promoting astronomy and meteorology
- Atomic force acoustic microscopy, a type of scanning probe microscopy
- White people . "AFAM", an initialism of "A Foreigner Assigned in Manila" in a Filipino English is a slang for White-skinned people from the Western Hemisphere with particular emphasis on those from the United States
