= AGB =

AGB may refer to:

== Positions ==
- Advocate-General of Bengal
- Attorney General of Bangladesh
- Attorney-General of Barbados
- Attorney-General of Belize
- Attorney General of Bermuda
- Attorney General of Bhutan
- Attorney General of Brunei

== Other uses ==
- Alexander Graham Bell, Scots Canadian American inventor
- Amerika-Gedenkbibliothek, a library in Berlin, Germany
- Amsterdam Gençler Birliği, a Dutch football team
- Association of Governing Boards of Universities and Colleges
- Asymptotic giant branch, a category of stars
- Augsburg airport in Bavaria, Germany (IATA airport code AGB)
- Authentic Brands Group, an American brand management company
- Ashley Gibson Barnett Museum of Art, formerly the Polk Museum of Art, in Lakeland, Florida, US
- Game Boy Advance, its software and accessories (product code prefix AGB)
- Gbo language (ISO 639-3 code AGB), Nigeria
- A US Navy hull classification symbol: Icebreaker (AGB)
