= AGU =

Agu is a surname and given name.

AGU may also refer to:

== Universities ==
- Abdullah Gül University, in Kayseri, Turkey
- Aichi Gakuin University, in central Japan
- Aoyama Gakuin University, in Shibuya, Tokyo, Japan
- Arabian Gulf University, in Al-Manāmah, Bahrain
- Alakh Prakash Goyal Shimla University, in Shimla, India

== Organizations ==
- American Geophysical Union, an international organization of geoscientists
- Lic. Jesús Terán Peredo International Airport (IATA airport code), in Aguascalientes, Mexico
- Air Guadeloupe, an airline operating in 1994-2000
- Asian Gymnastics Union, a continental union under the International Federation of Gymnastics (FIG)

== Science and technology ==
- Address generation unit, a part of computer processors involved in performing memory accesses
- Anhydroglucose unit, a single sugar molecule in a polymer
- Aspartylglucosaminuria, a rare genetic illness
- a codon for the amino acid serine

== Other uses ==
- All Grown Up!, an animated television series
- Attorney General of Brazil (Portuguese: Advocacia-Geral da União)
- Awakatek language (ISO 639-3 language code), spoken in Guatemala
