= AOU =

AOU may refer to:

- American Ornithologists' Union, former name of American Ornithological Society
- Apparent oxygen utilisation
- Arab Open University, private university
- Aou (trigraph)
- Age of Ultron, a 2013 series published by Marvel Comics
  - Avengers: Age of Ultron, a 2015 superhero film of the same name by Marvel Studios
