= AFSA =

AFSA may refer to:

- African Space Agency
- Air Force Sergeants Association
- Albanian Financial Supervisory Authority
- American Federation of School Administrators
- American Financial Services Association
- American Foreign Service Association
- Armed Forces Security Agency, precursor to the US National Security Agency
- Artists for a Free South Africa (1989–c.2014; from 1994 Artists for a New South Africa)
- Astana International Financial Centre, or Astana Financial Services Authority
- Australian Financial Security Authority, an Australian Government agency
