= ALOC =

ALOC may refer to:

- Air line of communication
- Altered level of consciousness
- Actual lines of code

== See also ==
- Alok
- Alloc
- Allock, Kentucky
