= ADHS =

ADHS may refer to:

== Schools ==
- Acton District High School
- Alfred Deakin High School
- Almonte and District High School
- Athens District High School
- Arnprior District High School
- Athens Drive High School

== Other uses ==
- Attention-deficit hyperactivity disorder, sometimes referred to as attention-deficit hyperactivity syndrome
- Appalachian Development Highway System
- Arizona Department of Health Services
- 2-amino-3,7-dideoxy-D-threo-hept-6-ulosonate synthase, an enzyme
