= AGM =

AGM or agm may refer to:

== Military ==
- Air-to-ground missile, a missile designed to be launched from military aircraft
- Artillery Gun Module, an air-portable self-propelled howitzer
- A US Navy hull classification symbol: Missile range instrumentation ship (AGM)

== Organisations ==
- Active Gaming Media, a game localization company based in Japan
- Apollo Global Management, an American private equity firm
- Art Gallery of Mississauga, an art gallery in Canada
- Federal Agricultural Mortgage Corporation (NYSE symbol), a US loan and mortgage company

== Science and technology ==
- AGM postulates, a set of conditions describing knowledge and belief revision
- Absorbent glass mat, a technology used in some models of VRLA battery
- Aorta-gonad-mesonephros, a part of chicken, mouse, and human embryos
- Arithmetic–geometric mean, a function of two positive numbers that is between the arithmetic mean and the geometric mean

== Other uses ==
- Angaataha language (ISO 639-3 code)
- Annual general meeting, a meeting of the general membership of an organization
- Award of Garden Merit, by the British Royal Horticultural Society
- Tasiilaq Heliport (IATA airport code), Greenland
