= AAAS =

AAAS may refer to:

- American Academy of Arts and Sciences ("AAAS" or "AAA&S"), a learned society and center for policy research; the publisher of the journal Dædalus
- American Association for the Advancement of Science, an organization that supports scientific collaboration, education, and outreach; the publisher of the journal Science
- Association for Asian American Studies, an organization that promotes teaching and research in Asian American studies
- Associate of the American Antiquarian Society
- AAAS (gene), a human gene responsible for triple-A syndrome (achalasia, adrenocortical insufficiency, alacrimia)
