= AFK =

AFK or afk may refer to:

== Songs ==
- "AFK", on the 2004 album Summer in Abaddon by Pinback
- "AFK", on the 2015 album Glyptothek by Momus

== Transport infrastructure ==
- Ashford International railway station, England (National Rail code: AFK)
- Angamaly railway station, India (Indian Railways code: AFK)
- Kondavattavan Tank Waterdrome, Sri Lanka (IATA code: AFK)
- Nebraska City Municipal Airport, US (FAA code: AFK)

== Other uses ==
- Away from keyboard, a phrase used in video games
- Nanubae language (ISO 639-3 code: afk)

== See also ==
- TPB AFK (TPB AFK: The Pirate Bay Away From Keyboard), a 2013 documentary film
