= AFG =

−AFG may refer to:

- Afghanistan, ISO 3166-1 and UNDP code
  - Afghan Sign Language, ISO 639-3 code
- AFG Arena, St. Gallen, Switzerland
- American Financial Group, insurer, Cincinnati, Ohio, US
- Former Automotive Financial Group, car dealers, Worthing, West Sussex, England
