= ABK =

ABK may refer to:

== Organizations ==
- Activision Blizzard (Activision Blizzard King), American games studio
  - ABK Workers Alliance, organized workers at Activision Blizzard King
- Ambac Financial Group (former stock symbol)
- Ahrends, Burton and Koralek architects
- Åtvidabergs BK (ÅBK), a Swedish bandy club

== Other uses ==
- Anybody Killa, a rapper also called ABK)
- Abkhaz language (ISO 639-3 code)
- Aktienbrauerei Kaufbeuren or ABK, 700-year-old brewery in Swabia
- Alasdair Beckett-King, comedian
- Kabri Dar Airport in Somali Region, Ethiopia (IATA airport code ABK)
