= AWW =

AWW may refer to:

- Adelaide Writers' Week, Australian annual literary festival
- Algiers, Winslow and Western Railway (US railroad reporting mark), Indiana, US
- Antwerp Water Works, Belgium
