= Asia Education Foundation =

Australian school program

Coordinates: 37°47′56″S 144°57′50″E

Asia Education Foundation Sidney Myer Asia Centre
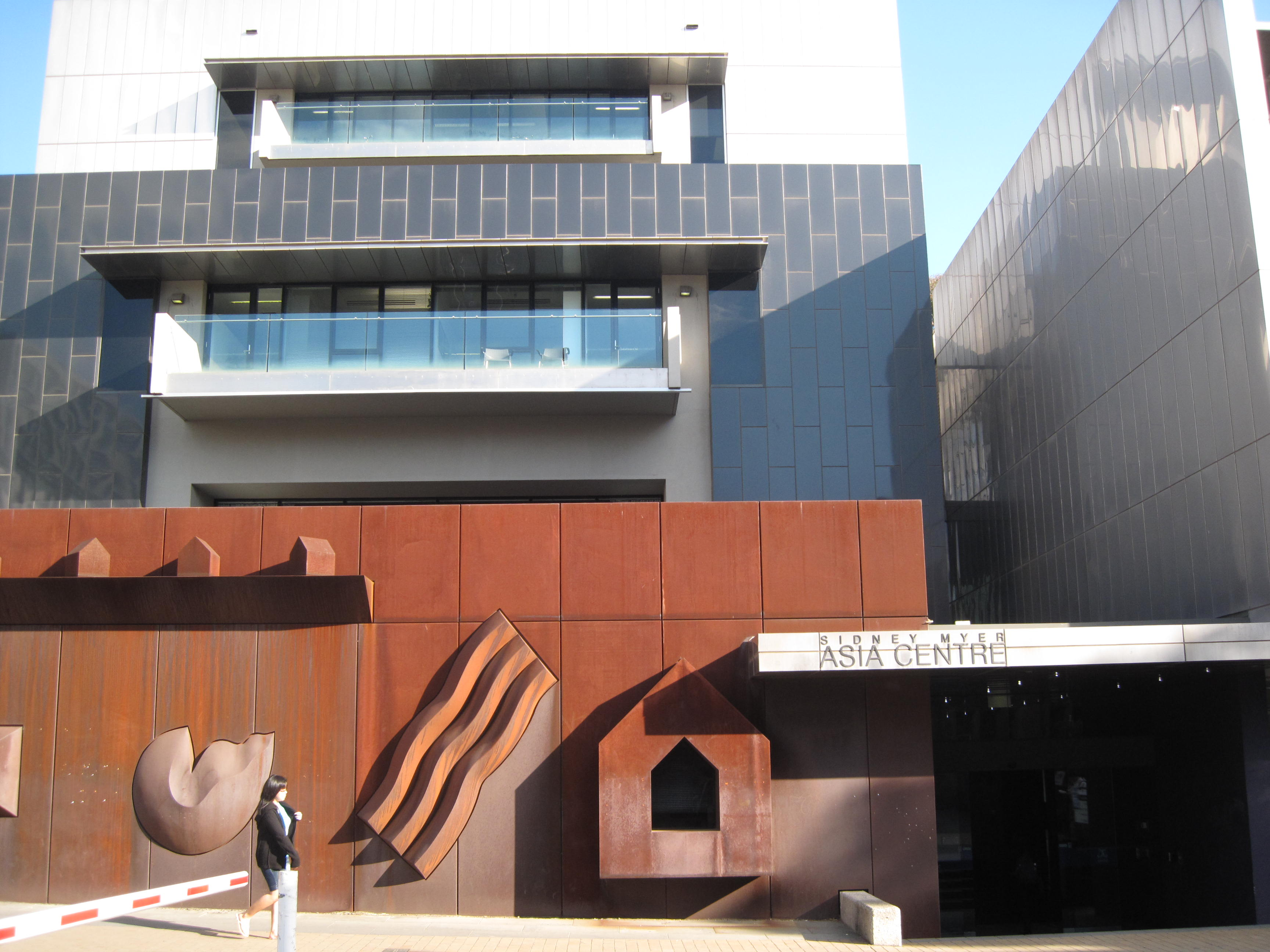
- Asia Education Foundation Headquarters
- University of Melbourne, Parkville, Victoria, Australia

Information
- Established: 1992
- Public transit: Trams 3, 5, 6, 16, 19, 58, 59, 64, 67, 72
- Website: Asia Education Foundation

Asia Education Foundation (AEF) is a joint activity of Asialink to promote Asian literacy within Australian schools. AEF strives for Asian literacy not only in language, but knowledge in geography, history, literature, mathematics, science and culture. Together with Asialink, AEF offers a multitude of programs for educators and principals to travel to the Asia, thereby expanding their knowledge in the region.

In recent years, the AEF formed the Business Alliance for Asia Literacy and Education Alliance for Asia Literacy. Both are composed of major corporations, as well as education and community organisations. These alliances seek to shift the Australian school curriculum with a greater focus on the Asian region.

A major program by AEF is the Asia Literacy Ambassadors project, which partners professional business leaders with secondary schools. By sharing their stories, they educate students about the scope of employment opportunities available to Asia engaged individuals.
