= AFO =

AFO or afo may refer to:

== Arts and media ==
- A Funk Odyssey, album by English band Jamiroquai
- Academia Film Olomouc, a Czech film festival
- Aero Force One, a fan club for the rock band Aerosmith
- Afghan Film Organization, a film production company and archive
- AFO Records, the first African-American owned record label in the US
- Alien Front Online, a video game
- Animal Face-Off, a television show
- Anime Festival Orlando, a yearly anime convention in Orlando, Florida
- Australian Field Ornithology, a journal of BirdLife Australia

== Organizations ==
- Anti-Fascist Organisation, a provisional organization in Burma during World War II
- Arellano-Felix Organization, a drug trafficking cartel in Mexico, also known as the Tijuana Cartel
- Assemblée de la francophonie de l'Ontario, a Canadian cultural organization
- Association of Field Ornithologists, an ornithological organization, publishers of Journal of Field Ornithology

== Other uses ==
- Advanced Force Operations, a US military term
- Afo Dodoo (born 1973), Ghanaian footballer
- Afo, thought to be the world's oldest clove tree
- Afton Municipal Airport in Wyoming, US (IATA airport code AFO)
- Air Force One (disambiguation)
- Ameloblastic fibro-odontoma, an odontogenic tumor
- Animal feeding operation, as defined by the Environmental Protection Agency
- Ankle-foot orthosis, a brace for the ankle and foot
- Authorised Firearms Officer, a police officer in the UK who has received training and authorization to carry and use firearms
- Eloyi language (ISO-639: afo)
- Eloyi people, also called Afo
