= AISB =

AISB may refer to:

- American International School of Bucharest in Bucharest, Romania
- American International School of Budapest in Budapest, Hungary
- American International School of Bolivia in Cochabamba, Bolivia
- Apathy is Boring, also known as A is B
