= ASMP =

ASMP may refer to:

- Air-sol moyenne portée (French for medium-range air to surface), an air-launched nuclear weapon delivery system
- American Society of Media Photographers or before 1992 American Society of Magazine Photographers
- Asymmetric multiprocessing, a computing term
