= AOD =

AOD may refer to:

== Army ==
- Army Ordnance Department, a forerunner of the British Royal Army Ordnance Corps (RAOC)

== Arts and entertainment ==
=== Film ===
- Army of Darkness, a 1993 film, third in the Evil Dead series

=== Music ===
- Adrenalin O.D., a US hardcore punk band
- Act of Depression, the debut album by Underoath
- Art of Dying (band), a hard rock band
- Assembly of Dust, an American rock band
- Aubrey O'Day, an American singer/dancer
- Alastair O'Donnell, a British record producer and guitarist

=== Video games ===
- Tomb Raider: The Angel of Darkness, the 6th game in the Tomb Raider series
- Art of Defense, a type of multiplayer game common in Command & Conquer Generals: Zero Hour
- Astro On Demand, a Hong Kong TVB subscription channel
- Arsenal of Democracy (video game), a grand strategy wargame
- Angels of Death (video game), a Japanese horror adventure game

== Fraternal order ==
- Ancient Order of Druids, fraternal order revived in London in 1781

== Politics ==
- Alliance of Democracies, non-profit organisation

== Religion ==
- Roman Catholic Archdiocese of Detroit

== Science and technology ==
- Acousto-optic deflector, a device for controlling an optical beam
- Advanced optical disc, an old name for HD DVD, digital optical media
- Argon oxygen decarburization, a process in stainless steel making
- Ford AOD transmission, an automatic overdrive vehicle transmission manufactured by Ford Motor Company
- Above ordnance datum, a level expressed as a height above mean sea level
- Adult onset diabetes, a metabolic disorder, characterized by high blood glucose
- Aerosol optical depth, a measure for small particles suspended in the atmosphere
- Always-on display, a screen feature of certain smartphones
- Audio on demand, a system for listening to audio content

== Other ==
- Alcohol and Other Drugs (AOD) refers to substances, legal or illegal, that can alter mood, behavior, or physical functioning.
- Architecture Overview Document, a document related to Solution architecture, details the high-level requirements, principles and constraints that bound to particular project.
