= ACNA =

ACNA may refer to:

- Anglican Church in North America, a denomination in the US & Canada, a breakaway from the Anglican Communion
- ACNA (company), an Italian chemical company
