= ABCS =

ABCS may refer to:

- Army Battle Command System
- Aeromedical Biological Containment System
- ABCS Tournament, an international association football competition
- "ABCs" (song), 2008 single by K'naan featuring Chubb Rock
- Australian Broadcasting Corporation's TV station in Ceduna, South Australia (callsign "ABCS")
- "The ABC Song", also known as "The ABCs"

== See also ==
- ABC (disambiguation) (for ABCs)
