= ACCD =

ACCD may refer to:

- accD, the beta subunit of the Acetyl-CoA carboxylase enzyme
- Austin Community College District
- American Coalition of Citizens with Disabilities
- Art Center College of Design
