= AFSC =

AFSC may refer to:

- Air Force Safety Center
- Air Force Space Command, often abbreviated as AFSPC to avoid confusion with the now defunct AF Systems Command
- Air Force Specialty Code
- Air Force Systems Command
- American Friends Service Committee, an American Quaker organization
