= ACSC =

ACSC may refer to:

- Advanced Casino Systems Corporation, a product group of Bally Technologies
- Air Command and Staff College, Montgomery, Alabama
- Alternating Closed and Semi-Closed rebreather, a special type rebreather for diving
- Ambulatory care sensitive conditions, a category of illnesses or health conditions
- Anderson Community School Corporation, Anderson, Indiana
- Asheville City SC, a National Premier Soccer League club based in Asheville, North Carolina
- Australian Command and Staff College, Weston Creek, Canberra
- Australian Cyber Security Centre
- Automobile Club of Southern California
