= ADSR =

ADSR may refer to:

- ADSR envelope (attack–decay–sustain–release), a common type of music envelope
- Accelerator-driven subcritical reactor, a nuclear reactor using a particle accelerator to generate a fission reaction in a sub-critical assembly of fissionable material
- Attack Decay Sustain Release, the debut album from Simian Mobile Disco, released on 18 June 2007
