= AEB =

AEB may refer to:

== Organizations ==
- Aero Benin (ICAO code: AEB), Benin airline
- Afrikaner Eenheidsbeweging, small South African political party
- Agência Espacial Brasileira, the Brazilian space agency
- American Egg Board, a marketing body
- Associated Examining Board, an examination board in the UK

== People ==
- Ambrose E. Burnside, a Union general during the American Civil War
- Andries Brouwer, Dutch mathematician and computer programmer

== Technology ==
- Analog Expansion Bus, a piece of computer hardware
- Auto Exposure Bracketing, a feature on some cameras
- Autonomous Emergency Braking, a safety feature on automobiles (including on lorries and heavy good vehicles)
- Automated emergency braking system

== Other uses ==
- Annual Egyptological Bibliography, bibliography of Egyptology publications
- Baise Bama Airport in Guangxi, China (IATA airport code AEB)
- Tunisian Arabic language (ISO 639 code: aeb)
