= ARSC =

ARSC may refer to:

- Arctic Region Supercomputing Center
- Aircraft Repair and Supply Center, a U.S. Coast Guard logistics base located at Coast Guard Air Station Elizabeth City; renamed the Aviation Logistics Center in 2008
- Association for Recorded Sound Collections
- Athénée Royal Serge Creuz
