= AFV =

AFV may refer to:

== Entertainment ==
- Addams Family Values, a 1993 U.S. movie
- America's Funniest Home Videos, a U.S. television show

== Political ==
- The Artistic Freedom Voucher, a proposal by economist Dean Baker as an alternative to increasing fines for downloading copyright material
- American Family Voices, an American political organization
- Alianza Fidelidad por Veracruz (English: Fidelity Alliance for Veracruz), an electoral alliance that fought the 2007 election in the Mexican state of Veracruz

== Transportation and vehicles ==
- Armoured fighting vehicle, military combat vehicle
- Alternative fuel vehicle, uses renewable and zero-emission energy
- Ansdell and Fairhaven railway station, Lancashire, England (station code: AFV)
- Air Afrique Vacances (ICAO code: AFV); see List of airline codes (A)
