= Alaska Agricultural and Forestry Experiment Station =

Coordinates: 64°51′25″N 147°51′48″W

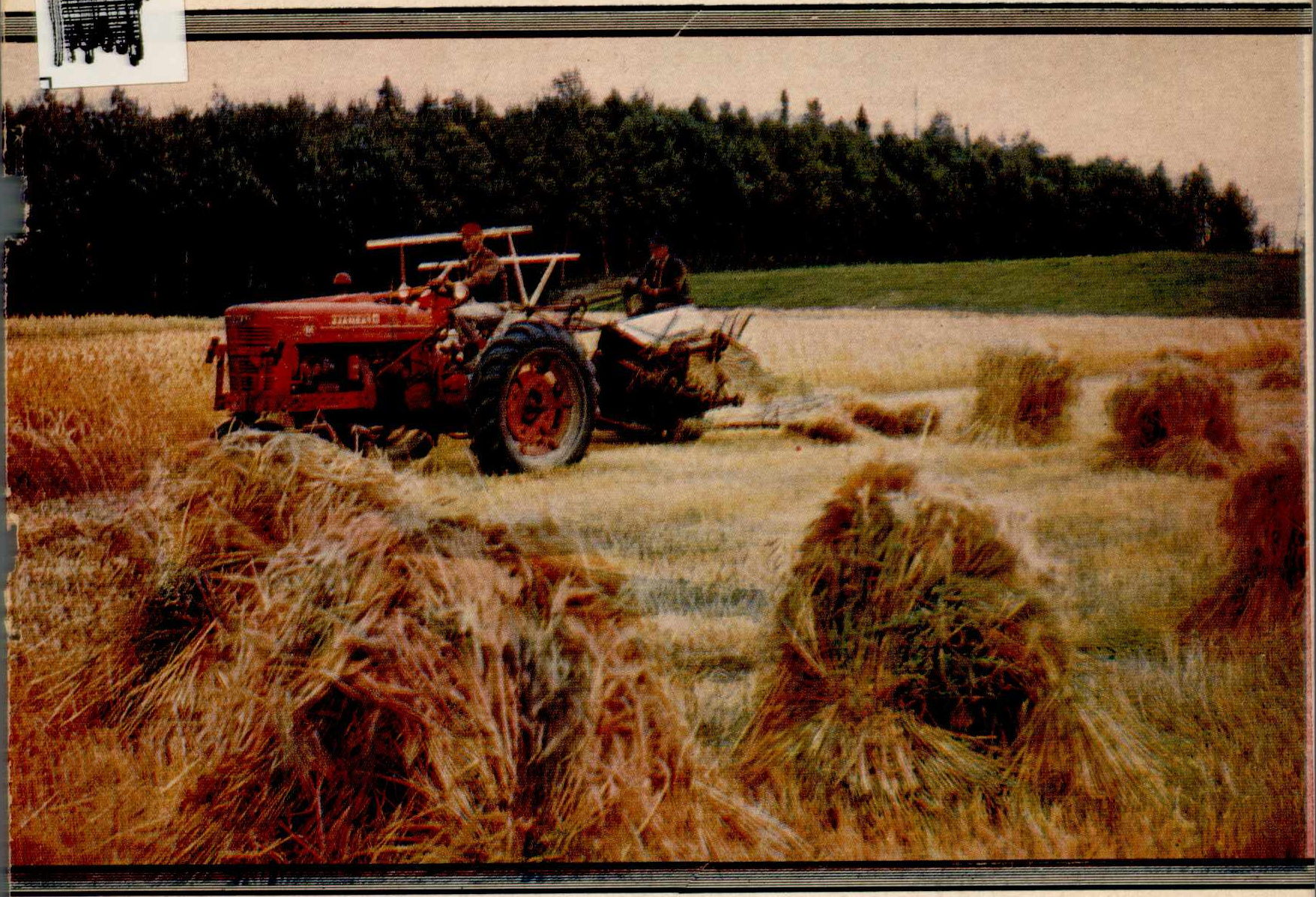
Harvesting Edda barley at Matanuska Station in 1951.

The Alaska Agricultural and Forestry Experiment Station (AFES) was established in 1898 in Sitka, Alaska, also the site of the first agricultural experiment farm in what was then Alaska Territory.

Research at AFES has concentrated on introducing vegetable cultivars appropriate to Alaska and developing adapted cultivars of grains, grasses, potatoes, and berries (for example, strawberries and raspberries). Animal and poultry management was also important in early research, with studies on sheep, yaks, cattle, dairy cows, and swine over the years. Other research is in soils (cryosols and carbon cycling studies, for example) and climate change, revegetation, forest ecology and management, and rural and economic development, including energy and biomass research.

== History ==
The Hatch Act of 1887 authorized agricultural experiment stations in the U.S. and its territories to provide science-based research information to farmers. In 1898 the federal government established the Alaska Agricultural Experiment Station in Sitka. The Kodiak station was also established in 1898, operating until 1931. Stations in Kenai (1899–1908), Rampart (1900–1925), Copper Center (1903–1908), and Fairbanks (1906–present) followed quickly. In 1915 the Matanuska Station (now the Matanuska Experiment Farm) was established.

In 1931 the federal government transferred ownership of all experiment station facilities to the College of Agriculture and Mines in Fairbanks. The Sitka and Kodiak stations were closed. The college was renamed the University of Alaska in 1935.

=== Region-specific variety development ===
Few varieties of northern-region grains, vegetables, and fruit have been developed for subarctic or arctic areas. The Alaska experiment station works to produce new varieties that will succeed in Alaska's weather conditions, often starting from plant or animal strains used in Scandinavia and Siberia. Below are release dates and varieties developed.

- 2009. Sunshine hulless barley
- 2008. Midnight Sun-flower (unofficial release)
- 2006. Wooding barley
- 2001. Finnaska, a short-stemmed, high-protein barley
- 1987. Kenai polargrass
- 1986. Nortran tufted hairgrass
- 1983. Alasclear potato
- 1981. Datal barley; Otal barley; Thual barley; Norcoast Bering hairgrass; Highlat russet potato; Squentna strawberry; Ingal wheat; Nogal wheat; Vidal wheat
- 1980. Sourdough bluejoint reedgrass
- 1979. Denali potato
- 1977. Alaska red potato
- 1976. Tundra glaucus bluegrass; Alyeska polargrass; Kiska raspberry; Toklat strawberry
- 1974. Yukon Chief corn
- 1972. Denali alfalfa; Lidal barley; Weal barley; Ceal oats; Toral oats
- 1970. Alaska 6467 & 6469 cabbages; Alaska Frostless potato; Early Tanana tomato
- 1969. Susitna and Matared strawberries
- 1968. Pioneer strawberry
- 1965. Nugget Kentucky bluegrass, Polar bromegrass
- 1964. Arctared red fescue
- 1963. Alaska russet potato
- 1961. Stately potato
- 1959. Alaska 114 potato
- 1953. Gasser wheat, Alaskaland red clover, Knik potato
- 1920. Trapmar barley
- 1905. Sitka hybrid strawberry
