= ASSC =

ASSC may refer to:

- Association for the Scientific Study of Consciousness
- Airborne Special Service Company, a special forces unit of the Republic of China Army
- Airport Surface Surveillance Capability, designed to reduce the possibility of runway incursions at airports
- Aviation Section, U.S. Signal Corps, the aerial warfare service of the United States from 1914 to 1918
- Anti Social Social Club, clothing brand in Los Angeles
- Aylesford School – Sports College, a secondary school in Kent, England
- The amiloride sensitive sodium channel, also called Epithelial sodium channel (ENaC)
- Areas of Special State Concern, a Croatian government designation for regional development

== See also ==
- Advancement of Sound Science Center
