= AHQ =

AHQ often stands for "Air Headquarters" and may refer to:

== British military units ==
- AHQ Air Defences Eastern Mediterranean
- AHQ Eastern Mediterranean
- Air Headquarters East Africa
- AHQ Iraq
- AHQ Levant
- AHQ Malta
- AHQ Western Desert became the Desert Air Force
- AHQ Libya became the Desert Air Force

== Other uses ==
- Air Headquarters (Pakistan)
- Ahq eSports Club, an esports team based in Taiwan
- Ah Q, the fictional protagonist of the novella The True Story of Ah Q
