= A1C (disambiguation) =

Glycated hemoglobin (hemoglobin A1c or Hb_{A1c}) is a surrogate marker for blood glucose levels.

A1C may also refer to:

- A1C, a Rivian prototype vehicle
- A1C spacesuit, an Apollo variant of the NASA Gemini spacesuit
- Airman first class, an enlisted rank in the U.S. Air Force
- A1C, a postal code in Downtown St. John's, Newfoundland Island, Canada

== See also ==
- AIC (disambiguation)
- ALC (disambiguation)
- Alpha-1A adrenergic receptor, formerly known also as the alpha-1C adrenergic receptor
- MV A1C William H. Pitsenbarger, a container ship
