= ALG =

ALG may refer to:

== Airfields ==
- Advanced Landing Ground, temporary airfields created by the Allies in World War II
  - ALG Wormhout, the Advanced Landing Ground home base of 'B' Flight, 665 (AOP) Squadron RCAF, near Dunkirk, France
- Houari Boumediene Airport (IATA airport code ALG), Algiers, Algeria

== Enterprises and organizations ==
- ALG, a company that provides information on future residual values of vehicles; purchased by TrueCar in 2011
- American Laser Games, a former US company
- Apple Leisure Group, a US travel company
- Association of London Government, a local government association in England
- Art. Lebedev Group, the holding company which owns Art. Lebedev Studio
- Liptako–Gourma Authority (Autorité du Liptako-Gourma), a regional development organization in Africa

== Science and technology ==
- Anti-lymphocyte globulin, an immunosuppressive drug
- Application-level gateway, in computer networking

== Sports ==
- A-League, a domestic football league in Australasia
- ALG Spor, a football club in Gaziantep, Turkey

== Other uses ==
- Algeria, IOC and UNDP country code
- Algonquian languages (ISO 639 code ALG)
- Automatic Language Growth, an approach to language learning/teaching
