= ACDA =

ACDA may refer to:

- Allegheny County District Attorney
- American Choral Directors Association, a non-profit organization
- Arms Control and Disarmament Agency, an independent agency
- Assured Clear Distance Ahead, a fundamental driving principle
- Atyap Community Development Association, a sociocultural organization of the Atyap people
- Thomas Acda (born March 6, 1967), television actor
