= ABCA =

ABCA may refer to:

- ABCA Armies, an international military organization established in 1947
- ABC transporter proteins, subfamily A
- Alberta Court of Appeal, common name of the Court of Appeal of Alberta, Canada
- Alcoholic Beverage and Cannabis Administration (District of Columbia)
- American Baseball Coaches Association
- Army Bureau of Current Affairs, an organisation set up to educate and raise morale amongst British servicemen in World War II
- Association of Bangladesh-China Alumni, organisation for Bangladeshis who have studied or worked in China
- Ausable Bayfield Conservation Authority, a local conservation agency in Southern Ontario, Canada
- West Virginia Alcohol Beverage Control Administration
