= ACV =

ACV may refer to:

== Companies and organizations ==
- Airports Corporation of Vietnam
- Asser Christelijke Voetbalvereniging (English: Assen Christian Football Club), a Dutch amateur football club
- Associated Commercial Vehicles, a former vehicle manufacturer of the UK, acquired by Leyland Motors Ltd
- Confederation of Christian Trade Unions (Dutch: Algemeen Christelijk Vakverbond), a Belgian trade union

== Economics ==
- Actual cash value, money equal to the cost of replacing lost, stolen, or damaged property after depreciation
- All-commodity volume, the total annual sales volume of retailers that can be aggregated from individual store-level up to larger geographical sets

== Military ==
- Air Cushion Vehicle, or Patrol Air Cushion Vehicle (PACV), a hovercraft used by the US Army in the Vietnam War
- Amphibious Combat Vehicle, an amphibious, wheeled armored vehicle for the US Marine Corps
- Armoured Combat Vehicle, a proposed wheeled Canadian tank replacement
- A retired US Navy hull classification symbol: Auxiliary aircraft carrier (ACV)
- Two Turkish armored combat vehicles:
  - FNSS ACV-15
  - FNSS ACV-19

== Other uses ==
- AC Virtus, football club in San Marino
- Achumawi language, the native language spoken by the Pit River people of present-day California
- Aciclovir, an antiviral drug
- ACV, an astronomical notation for an Alpha^{2} Canum Venaticorum variable
- Air cushion vehicle or hovercraft, a type of vehicle supported by high-pressure air
- Allegheny-Clarion Valley School District, a public school district in Clarion County, Pennsylvania, US
- Apple cider vinegar, a common vinegar available to consumers, popularly used in alternative medicine
- Arcata-Eureka Airport, California, US (IATA code: ACV)
- Assassin's Creed Valhalla, a 2020 video game
- Asset of community value, in England, protection of land/property from development
- Automatic control valve, an in-line fluid regulation device
- δ-(L-α-amino-adipate)-L-cysteine-D-valine, the biological precursor of penicillin
