= AXP =

AXP may refer to:

- Alpha AXP, later known as DEC Alpha, a 64-bit instruction set architecture developed by Digital Equipment Corporation (DEC)
- Anomalous X-ray pulsar
- American Express, whose NYSE ticker symbol is "AXP"
- Alexandra Parade railway station, United Kingdom, whose National Rail code is "AXP"
- Alpha Chi Rho, a fraternity whose Greek letters resemble "ΑΧΡ"
- Automotive X Prize
- The Atheist Experience
- Athlon XP, an AMD processor
- Architectural Experience Program
- Aerial Xpress, a pro wrestling tag team of Scorpio Sky and Quicksilver
- Spring Point Airport, whose IATA airport code is "AXP"
