= ANM =

ANM may refer to:

- Active Network Management, a control system that manages DER's and load on the electricity distribution network
- Administrația Națională de Meteorologie, the Romanian public weather prediction organisation
- Alaska Naval Militia, the naval force of Alaska
- Anisotropic Network Model, a tool for Normal Mode analysis of proteins
- ANM (Naples) (formally Azienda Napoletana Mobilità), a large public transit agency in Naples, Italy
- Antsirabato Airport, Antalaha, Madagascar, from its IATA airport code
- Arab Nationalist Movement, a former pan-Arab nationalist organization
- Australian Nationalist Movement, a neo-Nazi organisation founded by Jack van Tongeren
- Australian Newsprint Mills, Australian company
- Auxiliary nurse midwife, village level female health worker in India
