= ALPA =

ALPA or Alpa may refer to:

- Alpa, a formerly Swiss camera design company and manufacturer of 35 mm cameras
- Alpa, Tavas
- Air Line Pilots Association, International
- Arbitrated Loop Physical Address, used in part of some computer systems, e.g. device numbering on Fibre Channel loops
- Alpa, an alternate name of Alope (Ozolian Locris), an ancient city of Greece
