= ADW =

ADW may refer to:

== Organizations ==
- Academy of Sciences of the German Democratic Republic (German: Deutsche Akademie der Wissenschaften zu Berlin, AdW)
- Air Andaman, a defunct Thai airline
- Archdiocese of Washington

== Transport infrastructure ==
- Addiewell railway station, West Lothian, Scotland
- Andrews Field, a military airfield in Maryland, US
- Joint Base Andrews in Camp Springs, State of Maryland, US (IATA airport code ADW)

== Other uses ==
- Advance-deposit wagering
- ADW.Launcher, an alternative home screen for the Android operating system
- Amondawa language
- Andrew Dickson White, diplomat, historian and first president of Cornell University
- Animal Diversity Web, a natural sciences database at the University of Michigan
- Assault with a deadly weapon, an abbreviation used in sentencing descriptions
- Atlanta Daily World, a newspaper
