= APOE =

APOE may refer to:

- Apolipoprotein E (Apo-E)), a protein implicated in Alzheimer's disease and cardiovascular diseases
- Association of Professional Oklahoma Educators (APOE)
