= AVB =

AVB may refer to:

== People ==
- Abraham van Beijeren (1620–1690), still-life painter
- Armin van Buuren (born 1976), DJ and trance music producer
- Anthony Vanden Borre (born 1987), footballer
- André Villas-Boas (born 1977), Portuguese football manager
- Antônio Villas Boas (1934–1992), Brazilian farmer

== Technology ==
- Android Verified Boot, a booting security measure for Android devices
- Atmospheric vacuum breaker, a plumbing device
- Audio Video Bridging, an IEEE 802.1 standards initiative

== Music ==
- Acappella Vocal Band, a musical group also known as All Vocal Band
- April Verch Band

== Other uses ==
- Anahim Volcanic Belt, a geological feature in British Columbia, Canada
- Airbus versus Boeing, competition between the aircraft manufacturers
- Atrioventricular block, a heart disease
- Avantix Mobile, a portable ticket machine on British railways
- Aviano Air Base in northern Italy
- A US Navy hull classification symbol: Advance Aviation Base Ship (AVB)
