= Aoi =

Aoi may refer to:

- Ao (color), a Japanese color word (noun)
- Aoi (name), a Japanese given name and a Japanese surname
- Aoi, the Japanese name for various plants used in Japanese heraldry, including the hollyhock and wild ginger
- Aoi, a shorthand for the Tokugawa clan which took the plant as its symbol
  - Aoi, Nagoya neighbourhood
  - Aoi Oshitayashiki residence in Aoi, Nagoya
- Aoi Matsuri, a hollyhock festival that takes place annually on 15 May in Kyoto, Japan
- Aoi (trigraph), the three letters "aoi"
- Aoi-ku, Shizuoka, a ward of Shizuoka, Shizuoka Prefecture, Japan
- Aoi Asahina, a character from the Danganronpa franchise

== Science and technology ==
- AND-OR-invert, a Boolean logic gate in electrical engineering
- Angle of incidence (disambiguation), angle from "straight on" (angle from perpendicular or normal)
- Arctic oscillation index, a measure of atmospheric pressure changes in the Arctic
- Automated optical inspection, manufacturing test system that uses optical vision to identify defects during the manufacturing of a printed circuit board
- Area of interest, a contiguous area that is of interest for military purposes, related to area of responsibility

== Organizations ==
- Arab Organization for Industrialization, an Egyptian defense manufacturing consortium
- Association of Illustrators, a non-profit trade association for illustrator's rights and professional standards (U.K.)
- AOI Records, a record label created by De La Soul
- Africa Orientale Italiana, an Italian colony in Africa
- Association of the Oldest Inhabitants of the District of Columbia, a civic organization based in Washington, D.C.
- Africa Open Institute for Music, Research and Innovation, a interdisciplinary music research institute at Stellenbosch University

== Other uses ==
- "Aoi" (song), a 2013 song by Sakanaction
- Aoi (TV series), a 2000 Japanese historical drama television series
- Ancona Airport's IATA code, near Ancona, Italy
- All Ordinaries, the primary index of the Australian securities market
- Articles of incorporation, the rules governing a corporation (U.S. and Canada)
- Art Official Intelligence, a series of albums by De La Soul
