= AWG (disambiguation) =

AWG is an abbreviation for American wire gauge.

AWG may also refer to:

== Science and technology ==
- Arbitrary waveform generator, a piece of electronic test equipment used to generate electrical waveforms
- Arrayed waveguide grating, in telecommunications, an optical (de)multiplexing device
- Atmospheric water generator, a device that extracts water from humid air
- Anthropocene Working Group, a research group dedicated to the study of the Anthropocene as a geological time unit

== Businesses and organizations ==
- Anglian Water Group, a British water company
- Association for Women Geoscientists
- Associated Wholesale Grocers
- Australian Writers' Guild

== Other uses ==
- American Winery Guide, a compendium of wineries in the United States
- Arctic Winter Games, an international biennial sports competition
- Asian Winter Games, an international winter sports competition for members of the Olympic Council of Asia
- Aruban guilder, the currency of Aruba by ISO 4217 code
- Asymmetric Warfare Group, a unit of the United States Army which crafts doctrine for asymmetric warfare
