= AGW =

AGW may refer to:

- Anthropogenic global warming, overall warming of Earth's climate caused or produced by humans
- Actual gold weight, a measure used in gold bullion, coin or bar
- Agnew Airport (IATA: AGW), Queensland, Australia
- Access gateway, shorthand for multi-service access gateway (MSAG), a device used in telecommunications
- Argentine Great Western Railway
- Art Gallery of Windsor, Ontario, Canada
- Attorney General of Washington
- Attorney General of Wisconsin
- Attorney General of Wyoming
- Auditor General for Wales
- Avia (airline) (ICAO: AGW), a former airline Johannesburg, South Africa
- Kahua language (ISO 639-3: agw)
