= AKP =

AKP may refer to:

== Companies ==
- Arbaaz Khan Productions, an Indian motion picture production and distribution company, based in Mumbai

== Political parties ==
=== Communist parties ===
- Arbeidernes Kommunistparti (Workers' Communist Party (Norway)), a Norwegian political party
- Azərbaycan Kommunist Partiyası (Azerbaijan Communist Party), one of two Azerbaijan political parties:
  - Azerbaijan Communist Party (1920), the Azerbaijan branch of the Communist Party of the Soviet Union
  - Azerbaijan Communist Party (1993), a minor political party in the post-Soviet Republic of Azerbaijan

=== Other uses in political parties ===
- Adalet ve Kalkınma Partisi (Justice and Development Party), Turkish conservative political party
- Ang Kapatiran, a Philippine political party

== Other ==
- Anaktuvuk Pass Airport in Anaktuvuk Pass, Alaska (IATA code "AKP")
- Alpha Kappa Psi, American fraternal society for people studying for or engaged in business activities
- Agence Kampuchea Presse, the national press agency of Cambodia
- Ansar Khalifa Philippines, an Islamic militant group in the Philippines
