= AFI =

AFI may refer to:

== Arts and media ==
- AFI (band), an American rock band
  - AFI (2017 album), the tenth studio album by AFI
  - AFI (2004 album), a retrospective album by AFI released in 2004
- Aquarium Fish International , a monthly magazine published in North America (1988–2012)
- Ashton Fletcher Irwin (born 1994), an Australian drummer

== Organizations ==
- Agencia Federal de Inteligencia, the Argentine national intelligence agency
- Agencia Federal de Investigación (Federal Investigations Agency), a Mexican agency
- Alliance for Financial Inclusion, an organization of central bank regulators from the developing world
- American Film Institute, an independent non-profit film organization
- American Football Ireland, the organizing body for American football in the Republic of Ireland and Northern Ireland
- American Football Israel, a nonprofit sports organization
- Aniridia Foundation International, a support organization for people with Aniridia and family members
- Association des Femmes Ivoiriennes, women's organization in the Ivory Coast
- Australian Film Institute, an organisation that promotes Australian film and television

== Science and technology ==
- Actual flip-angle imaging, a type of magnetic resonance imaging (MRI)
- Address-family identifier, a 16 bit field of the Routing Information Protocol
- Amniotic fluid index, a measure of the amount of amniotic fluid of a fetus
- Application Family Identifier, an 8 bit field of an RFID tag
- Nikon AF-I, a type of Nikon F-mount lens

== Other uses ==
- Afi, Iran, a village in East Azerbaijan Province, Iran
- Air Force Instruction, documented instructions for members of the US Air Force
- Akrukay language, a Ramu language of Papua New Guinea
- Amalfi Airport (Colombia) in Antioquia Department, Colombia (IATA airport code AFI)
