= AJP =

AJP or ajp may refer to:

- American Journal of Philology, published by Johns Hopkins University Press
- American Journal of Psychiatry, published by the American Psychiatric Association
- American Journal of Psychology, published by the University of Illinois Press
- American Journal of Physics, published by the American Association of Physics Teachers and the American Institute of Physics
- American Journal of Physiology, published by the American Physiological Society
- Asian Jake Paul, single by American YouTuber IDubbbz
- Australasian Journal of Philosophy, published by the Australasian Association of Philosophy
- AJP Motos, a Portuguese motorcycle brand
- Animal Justice Party, a political party in Australia focusing on animal rights
- Apache JServ Protocol, protocol for computer servers
- All Japan Pro Wrestling, Japanese professional wrestling promotion
- South Levantine Arabic (deprecated ISO 639-3 code)
- AJP6 and AJP8, TVR engines
- Assam Jatiya Parishad, political party in India
