= ACDT =

ACDT may refer to:

- Apple Certified Desktop Technician, a computer certification
- Australian Central Daylight Time, a time in Australia
