= Certification, Licensure, and Credentialing for the New Nurse Practitioner in Wisconsin =

American state certification

Advanced practice registered nurses (APRNs) are registered nurses with graduate degrees in nursing. APRN roles include: certified nurse midwife, clinical nurse specialist, certified registered nurse anesthetist, and nurse practitioner. APRNs assess, diagnose, manage patient medical problems, order diagnostic tests, and prescribe medications. Rules, regulations, and credentialing for APRNs vary by state. This page outlines the regulatory processes for nurse practitioners in Wisconsin, including education, certification, licensing, and credentialing. Regulatory and credentialing processes are continuously changing, and the information contained on this page is current as of November 2015.

== Preparation ==
Graduate education serves as the background for nurse practitioner (NP) preparation. In Wisconsin, an applicant must hold a master's degree in nursing or a related health field from a college or university to sit for the NP certification exam. The college or university attended by an applicant should be accredited by “a regional accrediting agency approved by the board of education in the state in which the college or university is located”. The nationally recognized advanced practice accrediting agencies includes the Commission on Collegiate Nursing Education (CCNE) and the Accreditation Commission for Education in Nursing (ACEN).

Additionally, an applicant must successfully complete the NP curriculum, which must include all didactic NP program coursework. The Wisconsin State Board of Nursing requires the following graduate level core courses for NP candidates: advanced pathophysiology, advanced pharmacology, and advanced physical assessment. The advanced pathophysiology course should include all general principles that are applicable across the human lifespan. Similarly, the advanced pharmacology course must include pharmacokinetics, pharmacodynamics, and pharmacotherapeutics of broad categories of agents. Finally, the advanced physical evaluation, or assessment, course must include assessment of all systems of the body, advanced assessment methods, techniques, and concepts. In addition, faculty-supervised clinical practice hours are required, which serves as the basis of the clinical practice.

The nurse practitioners are the registered nurses (RNs) with education beyond the basic requirement for RN. For that reason, a current active RN license issued by the state of Wisconsin is required for NP preparation. In addition, a transcript showing academic works or a final official transcript showing the awarded degree is required to be eligible to sit for the certification exam. Currently, there are two credentialing bodies that offer certification examinations for NPs: the American Nurses Credentialing Center (ANCC), and the American Academy of Nurse Practitioners (AANP). The ANCC offers certifications for family, gerontology, adult, pediatric, acute care, and other APRN specialities. The AANP currently offers certification exams for adult, family, and adult-gerontology nurse practitioners and offer two 75-item multiple choice practice examinations, which includes one exam set for family nurse practitioner (FNP) and other for adult-gerontology nurse practitioner (A-GNP). There is a US$50 per-use fee associated with accessing each practice exam set.

== Certification ==
Upon completion of the preparatory requirements outlined above, an individual can obtain certification. To obtain certification, the individual must first apply to take the certification exam through the ANCC or AANP. The examination application requires the applicant to hold a master's or doctoral degree from an accredited school in addition to a validation of education form signed by college or university faculty. The applicant must also hold a current RN license issued by Wisconsin or a compact state. The applicant must have completed a minimum of 500 supervised clinical hours (more hours may be required depending on specialty). Once the application is accepted and approved, the applicant may sit for the certification exam. Certification is granted upon successful completion of the exam with a passing score of 85% or above. Certification is valid for 5 years.

== Licensure ==
Licensure is the process by which the state of Wisconsin and the Wisconsin Board of Nursing give an individual permission to practice as a nurse practitioner in Wisconsin. Obtaining licensure permits an individual to use the title of nurse practitioner, allowing them to practice within a specific scope of practice, and indicates that the individual has met the minimum required professional competencies. APRNs are first licensed as an RN and obtain a second licensure as an APRN. To be licensed as an RN, an individual must graduate from an accredited school of nursing; the term “accredited” indicates that the curriculum has been approved by the Wisconsin Board of Nursing. The next step is to apply to take the National Council Licensing Exam (NCLEX). This step requires the accredited school of nursing to submit a certification of graduation directly to The Wisconsin Board of Nursing. Once an individual has passed the NCLEX examination they are granted an RN license.

To be licensed as an APRN, a similar process occurs. Graduation from an accredited Master's or Doctoral program is required. The next step is to be certified by a national certifying body, such as the American Nurses Credentialing Center (ANCC) or the American Association of Nurse Practitioners (AANP). See Certification section above. Once certified, the Wisconsin Board of Nursing recognizes the individual as competent to practice as an APRN.

The Wisconsin Board of Nursing also regulates licensure as an Advanced Practice Nurse Prescriber (APNP). In order to obtain licensure as an APNP, the above credentials must be obtained first (RN licensure and certification as an APRN). Certification as an APNP is regulated by Chapter N8 of the Wisconsin Nurse Practice Act. In order to apply to take the certification examination for APNPs an individual must complete 45 contact hours in clinical pharmacology/pharmacotherapeutics within the last three years. The application requires proof of certification as an APRN by a certifying body and requires the payment of a fee. Once an individual passes the certification examination, that individual is licensed by the state of Wisconsin to practice as an APNP. The state of Wisconsin requires an APNP to practice in collaboration with a physician and the relationship must be documented.

== Credentialing ==
The Wisconsin State Legislature identifies four categories of the Advanced Practice Registered Nurse (APRN):

1. Certified Nurse Anesthetist (CRNA)
2. Certified Nurse Practitioners (CNP)
3. Certified Nurse Midwife (CNM)
4. Certified Clinical Nurse Specialist (CNS)

To hold the credentials of one of the four APRN positions recognized in the State of Wisconsin a master's or doctoral degree from an accredited school of nursing must be obtained. See education requirements outlined in Preparation section above. In addition to the post-graduate degree, approval from a national certifying body must be granted. See Licensure section above.
