= AWD =

AWD may refer to:

== Biology ==
- African Wild Dog (Lycaon pictus), a canid of sub-Saharan Africa
- Acute watery diarrhoea, liquid faeces

== Businesses and organisations ==
- AWD Holding (Allgemeiner Wirtschaftsdienst), a German company
- AWD Trucks, a British truck manufacturer
- Atomwaffen Division, an international neo-Nazi terrorist group based in the United States (2015–2020)

== Computing ==
- Adaptive web design, the progressive enhancement of a website
- Artweaver document, the default file extension used by the freeware raster graphics editor developed by Boris Eyrich
- Microsoft Fax Microsoft at Work Document (file extension)

== Laws ==
- Agency Worker Directive (2008/104/EC)
- Americans with Disabilities Act

== Vehicles ==
- Air Warfare Destroyer, a ship class of the Royal Australian Navy
- All-wheel drive, a power-train configuration for vehicles, most commonly four-wheel and six-wheel drive

== Other uses ==
- Afghan War Diary, a collection of thousands of US military documents that were leaked to the public via Wikileaks in July 2010
- Americans with disabilities
