= Air Combat Emulator =

Air Combat Emulator may refer to:

- Ace 1 (video game) or Air Combat Emulator I, a 1985 combat flight simulator
- Ace 2 (video game) or Air Combat Emulator II, a 1987 combat flight simulator

== See also ==
- ACE (disambiguation)
- Combat flight simulation game
- Field training exercise
- Flight simulator
- Microsoft Combat Flight Simulator
- Military wargaming
- Wargame
