= ANL =

ANL may refer to:

- American Negro League, one of the several Negro leagues that were established during the early twentieth century in the US when professional baseball was segregated
- Andulo Airport, an Angolan airport with this IATA code
- Anguilla, UNDP country code
- Anniesland railway station, from its UK rail code
- Anti-Nazi League, an anti-fascist campaign in the UK
- Anti-Nowhere League, an English punk band
- Argonne National Laboratory, one of the US Department of Energy National Laboratories
- Australian National Line, an Australian government-owned shipping company
- Australian Netball League, a second-tier netball competition in Australia
- A US Navy hull classification symbol: Net laying vessel (ANL)
