= ABPI =

ABPI may refer to:

- Ankle–brachial pressure index, a measure of the fall in blood pressure in the arteries supplying the legs
- Association of the British Pharmaceutical Industry, the trade association for companies in the UK producing prescription medicines
