= ACMC =

ACMC may refer to:

- Arts Council of Mendocino County
- Assistant Commandant of the Marine Corps
- Amazing Cinematic Music Channel
