= ASW =

ASW, a three-letter abbreviation, may refer to:

- Alumino silicate wool, a type of mineral wool
- Amphibian Species of the World, an online herpetology database hosted by the American Museum of Natural History
- Anti-submarine warfare
- Artificial seawater
- aSmallWorld, an online social network service
- Aswan International Airport (IATA airport code "ASW"), an airport in Egypt
- Asynchronous SpaceWarp, a framerate smoothing technique used on the Oculus Rift

== Organizations ==
- Amalgamated Society of Woodworkers, former UK trade union
- American School of Warsaw, Poland
- Arc System Works, a video game development company
- Arriva Scotland West, a defunct Scottish bus operator
- ASW Distillery, a manufacturer of liquor located in Atlanta, Georgia

== Sports ==
- All-Star Wrestling, a former professional wrestling promotion based in Vancouver, Canada
- All Star Wrestling, a professional wrestling promotion based in Liverpool, England
- Altijd Sterker Worden, a club from Dordrecht, Netherlands that merged into SC Emma
- Altijd Sterker Worden, a club from Hendrik-Ido-Ambacht, Netherlands under its original name
