= AYM =

AYM or aym may refer to:

- Aymara language, spoken in Bolivia, Peru and Chile
- The Alliance for Youth Movements, now known as Movements.org
- Achcham Yenbadhu Madamaiyada, a 2016 Indian Tamil-language film
- Angry young men, a British literary movement
- Anglesey Mining, a British mining company
- Aym (demon), in the Ars Goetia book of demonology
- Yas Island Seaplane Base, United Arab Emirates (IATA code: AYM)
- The Constitutional Court of Turkey (Turkish: Anayasa Mahkemesi), the highest legal body in Turkey

== People with the surname Aym ==
- Zighen Aym (born 1957), Algerian writer and engineer
