= ASUW =

ASUW may refer to:

- Associated Students of the University of Washington
- Associated Students of the University of Wyoming
- Anti-surface warfare (ASuW)
