= AMH =

AMH may refer to:

== Places ==
- Academia Mexicana de la Historia, the national academy of history, in Mexico
- Alaska Marine Highway, ferry services along the southern coast of Alaska and to Washington state
- Arba Minch Airport, Ethiopia (IATA airport code "AMH")
- Jefferson Abington Hospital (formerly known as Abington Memorial Hospital), a hospital in Pennsylvania, US
- Amahlongwa, a township in KwaZulu-Natal, South Africa

== Medicine ==
- Anti-Müllerian hormone, a protein encoded by the gene AMH and involved in male sexual development in embryos
- American Mission Hospital, a hospital network in the Kingdom Bahrain, in the Arabian Gulf, established in 1903
- Atlantic Modal Haplotype, a genetic Y-chromosome haplotype
- Australian Medicines Handbook, a medical reference text used by health professionals in Australia
- Atypical melanocytic hyperplasia

== Other uses ==
- American history (common college or university course code prefix "AMH")
- Amharic language (SIL and ISO 639-2 code "amh")
- amh, a Latin-script trigraph used in Irish orthography
- Aviation structural mechanic (Hydraulics) (US Navy occupational rating code "AMH")
- Anatomically modern humans, the sub-species Homo sapiens sapiens
- Anthony Michael Hall, an American actor running production company AMH Entertainment
