= Anglo-Australian Near-Earth Asteroid Survey =

The Anglo-Australian Near-Earth Asteroid Survey (AANEAS) operated from 1990 to 1996, becoming one of the most prolific programs of its type in the world. Apart from leading to the discovery of 38 near-Earth asteroids, 9 comets, 63 supernovae, several other astronomical phenomena and the delivery of a substantial proportion of all NEA astrometry obtained worldwide (e.g., 30% in 1994–95), AANEAS also led to many other scientific advances which were reported in the refereed literature.

== See also ==
- List of asteroid close approaches to Earth
- List of near-Earth object observation projects
