= ADATS =

ADATS may refer to:

- Air Defense Anti-Tank System
- Australian Defence Air Traffic System

== See also ==
- ADAT
