= ARBA =

Arba or ARBA may refer to:

== Places ==
- Arba (Achaea), a town in ancient Achaea, Greece
- Arba, Friuli-Venezia Giulia, a comune (municipality) in Italy
- Arba, Illyria, ancient name of modern Rab in Croatia
- Arba, Indiana, an unincorporated community in the United States

== Other uses ==
- Arba (beetle), a genus of insects in the subfamily Prioninae
- Arba (biblical figure), a man mentioned in the Bible
- Académie Royale des Beaux-Arts, a Belgian art school
- American Rabbit Breeders Association
- American Rare Breed Association, an American kennel club
- American Revolution Bicentennial Administration
- Ariba, an American software and information technology services company
- Roman Catholic Diocese of Arba, a titular see

== See also ==
- Arba Sicula, a nonprofit society for the preservation and promotion of the Sicilian language and culture
