= AZN =

AZN or Azn may refer to:

- Azerbaijani manat, ISO 4217 code for currency of Azerbaijan
- AZN Television
- AZN, the IATA code for Andizhan Airport
- AZN, the stock ticker symbol for AstraZeneca
- Western Durango Nahuatl (ISO 639 azn), a dialect of Mexicanero
- A shorthand form of Asian
