= ASOC =

ASOC may refer to:

- Anarcho-socialism
- Atlanta Symphony Orchestra Chorus
- Altered state of consciousness
- Advanced Linux Sound Architecture, a.k.a. ALSA System on Chip
- Amateur Station Operator's Certificate
- Applescript ObjC Binding, a.k.a. ApplescriptObjC
- Antarctic and Southern Ocean Coalition, international environmental organization
- Air Support Operations Center, a division of the United States Army
- Australian and New Zealand Standard Offence Classification, see Violent crime § Australia
