= ASCC =

ASCC may refer to:

- Alaska Systems Coordinating Council
- Air Standardization Coordinating Committee, an organisation tasked with enhancing coalition military aviation
- Air Station Cape Cod, a United States Coast Guard facility in Massachusetts
- American Samoa Community College
- Army Service Component Command
- Automatic Sequence Controlled Calculator, known as the Harvard Mark I, a World War II-era electro-mechanical computer
