= American Basketball League =

American Basketball League (ABL) is a name that has been used by four defunct basketball leagues in the US:

- American Basketball League (1925–1955), the first major professional basketball league
- American Basketball League (1961–1962), a league that only played a single full season
- American Basketball League (1996–1998), a women's basketball league
- American Basketball League (2013–2015), a semi-professional men's basketball league

== See also ==
- American Basketball Association (ABA)
