= AED =

Aed or AED may refer to:

== People ==
- Áed (given name)
- Aed Carabao (Yuenyong Opakul, born 1954), Thai leader of the band Carabao

== Science and medicine ==
- Antiepileptic drug
- Automated external defibrillator
- Atomic-emission detector, in chromatography

== Other ==
- AED Oil Limited
- AED-0, an extended ALGOL 60 used to write DYNAMO II
- Aed (god), an Irish god
- AED (non-profit) (formerly Academy for Educational Development), a defunct U.S. non-profit organization
- Advertising elasticity of demand, measuring advertising effectiveness
- Alpha Epsilon Delta (ΑΕΔ), a US premedical honor society
- Argentine Sign Language, ISO 639-3 language code
- United Arab Emirates dirham, by ISO 4217 currency code
