= Lobby Lud =

Fictional character used in newspaper competitions

A Lobby Lud newspaper clipping from the News Chronicle, 1935

Lobby Lud is a fictional character created in August 1927 by the Westminster Gazette, a British newspaper, now defunct. The character was used in readers' prize competitions during the summer period. Anonymous employees visited seaside resorts and afterwards produced a detailed description of the town they visited, without disclosing its name. They also described a person and declared him to be the "Lobby Lud" of that issue. Readers were given a pass phrase and had to both guess the location and find the person described. Anyone carrying the newspaper could challenge Lobby Lud with the phrase and receive £5 (equivalent to £263 in 2024).

The competition was created because people on holiday were known to be less likely to buy a newspaper. Some towns and large factories had holiday fortnights (called "wakes weeks" in the north of England); the town or works would all decamp at the same time. Circulation could drop considerably in the summer and proprietors hoped prizes would revive it.

The character's name was derived from the paper's telegraphic address, "Lobby, Ludgate".

The British colloquial phrase "You are (name) and I claim my five pounds" is associated with Lobby Lud, despite being based on a similar idea created by a different paper.

== Other papers ==
After the demise of the Gazette in 1928 the competition continued in The Daily News, which became the News Chronicle from 1930; in turn, it was absorbed into the Daily Mail in 1960. Other newspapers such as the Daily Mirror ran similar schemes. "You are (name) and I claim my five pounds", the most well-known phrase, seems to date from a Daily Mail version after World War II. A train, the Lobby Lud Express, was run to take Londoners to resorts that Lobby visited.

In 1983, an original Lobby Lud – William Chinn – was discovered aged 91 in Cardiff, Wales. The Daily Mirror's "Chalkie White" continues to visit resorts, and the idea has been taken up by local radio stations and other media, often offering lesser prizes. Chalkie is a typical nickname applied to people with the surname White. An example is Andy Capp's closest friend in a long-running Daily Mirror cartoon strip.

== Lobby Lud in popular culture ==
- Graham Greene's Brighton Rock (1938) uses a Lobby Lud character (called Kolley Kibber) as a plot device.
- The device also appears in the ITV show Agatha Christie's Poirot episode "The Jewel Robbery at the Grand Metropolitan," though not in the original story written before the Lobby Lud phenomenon in 1924: on holiday at the seaside, Poirot is mistaken for the man in the newspaper contest, "Lucky Len".
- In V. S. Naipaul's novel A House for Mr. Biswas (1961), Mr. Biswas, working as a journalist, tours Trinidad hoping to be approached with the phrase "You are the Scarlet Pimpernel and I claim the Sentinel prize!"
- The phrase "You are X and I claim my five pounds" has become a humorous way of pointing out a similarity between a subject and a second person. It was regularly used by the British satirical magazine Private Eye, most notably on the cover of issue 180 in November 1968 which showed a photograph from the wedding of the former Jackie Kennedy in which the bride was depicted as saying: "You are Aristotle Onassis and I claim my five million pounds."
