= ADGB =

ADGB may refer to:

- Allgemeiner Deutscher Gewerkschaftsbund, confederation of German trade unions
- Air Defence of Great Britain, the predecessor organization to RAF Fighter Command
