= ASIP =

ASIP may refer to:

- Advanced Special Improvement Program models of US military SINCGARS radio family
- Agouti signalling peptide, a protein coded by the gene ASIP
- Always Sunny in Philadelphia
- American Society for Investigative Pathology
- Application-specific instruction set processor
- AppleShare IP
