= ACOM =

ACOM or Acom may refer to:

- Acom, a Japanese consumer loan company
- Alabama College of Osteopathic Medicine, an American medical school
- The Anglican Church of Melanesia, or the Church of the Province of Melanesia
- Association for Convention Operations Management
- Australian College of Ministries
- Agency.com, Ltd. (former NASDAQ stock ticker symbol)
- Ancestry.com, Inc. (NASDAQ stock ticker symbol)
- Acom International, a former Japanese golf tournament
- Acom-1, a model of Konica Autoreflex 35mm SLR camera
