= APHA =

The acronym APHA may refer to:

- American Paint Horse Association, a horse breed registry
- American Pharmacists Association (APhA)
- American Printing History Association
- American Public Health Association
  - APHA color, a color standard named for the American Public Health Association
- Animal and Plant Health Agency, an executive agency of DEFRA, UK
- Apha, a genus of moths in the family Eupterotidae
