= AUT =

AUT may refer to the following.

== Locations ==
- Austria (ISO 3166-1 country code)
- Agongointo-Zoungoudo Underground Town, Benin
- Aktio–Preveza Undersea Tunnel, Greece
- Airstrip on Atauro Island, East Timor (IATA airport code)

== Organizations ==
- Arriva UK Trains
- Association of University Teachers, a former British trade union
- Aut Even Hospital, Ireland

== Education ==
- Amirkabir University of Technology, Iran
- Auckland University of Technology, New Zealand
- Aristotle University of Thessaloniki, Greece
- American University of Technology, Lebanon
- Association of University Teachers a former trade union in the United Kingdom

== Computing ==
- Advanced and application unit testing, test techniques in computer programming
- Application under test, in software testing, the software that is to be tested (by other software)
- Atlantis Underwater Tycoon, a computer game
- Autonomous Things, technologies that bring autonomous computers into the physical environment

== Other fields ==
- An automorphism group in mathematics
- Automated ultrasonic testing, for pipeline construction girthwelds
- Aeronautica Umbra Trojani AUT.18, an Italian fighter aircraft prototype of 1939
- Reporting mark for Autauga Northern Railroad
- Reporting mark for Auto-Train Corporation
