= AAPC =

AAPC may refer to:

- AAPC (healthcare) (formerly the American Academy of Professional Coders), a professional organization for healthcare business professionals in the US
- Additive/Abradable Powder Coatings; see Abradable powder coatings
- African Auxiliary Pioneer Corps, military unit, British Empire
- All-African Peoples' Conference
- Allied Artists Pictures Corporation, the former name of a Hollywood film studio
- American Association of Pastoral Counselors, a professional association of pastoral counselors
- American Association of Political Consultants, the trade group of the political consulting profession in the US
- American Automotive Policy Council, American automobile trade group of Ford, Chrysler, and General Motors
- Artificial antigen presenting cells
- Association des architectes paysagistes du Canada (Canadian Society of Landscape Architects)
- Australian Army Pay Corps, military unit, Australia; see Royal Australian Army Pay Corps
