= A&S =

A&S may refer to:

- Abraham & Straus, a defunct American department store
- Abramowitz and Stegun, a 1964 mathematical reference book
- Abilene and Southern Railway, a defunct American railroad
- College of Arts and Sciences, an academic division at many higher education institutions
- Faculty of Arts and Science, University of Toronto
