= DTO =

DTO or dto may refer to:

== Arts and entertainment ==
- Denkmäler der Tonkunst in Österreich, a series of Austrian sheet music (1894–2017)
- Disney's Toontown Online, an MMORPG video game (2003–2013)
- Download to own, in media distribution
- "D.T.O.", a song on the eponymous metalcore album Vision of Disorder

== Science, technology and medicine ==
- Data transfer object, in computer programming
- Deodorized (or denarcotized) and diluted tinctures of opium, two drugs; see Laudanum § Misinterpretation of "DTO"
- Download to own, in media distribution
- Driverless train operation, on railways

== Other uses ==
- Disruptive Technology Office, a US military funding agency (1998–2007)
- Drug trafficking organizations, in US law enforcement
- Domestic terrorist organization, in US law enforcement
- Tommo So, spoken in Mali (ISO 636:dto)
- Denton Municipal Airport, Texas, US (by IATA and FAA code)
