= AAM =

AAM may refer to:

== Organizations ==
- Academy of Ancient Music, a period-instrument orchestra based in Cambridge, England
- Accademia di Architettura di Mendrisio
- Alliance of Automobile Manufacturers
- Alliance for Audited Media
- American Alliance of Museums, an organization for museums and associated individuals
- American Axle & Manufacturing, a supplier of automotive components
- Anti-Apartheid Movement
- Association for Accessible Medicines, formerly known as the Generic Pharmaceutical Association (GPhA)
- Association of Assistant Mistresses, a former British trade union

== Places ==
- Aam, a hamlet in the Netherlands
- Mala Mala Airport in Mpumalanga Province, South Africa (IATA airport code AAM)

== Science and technology ==
- Active appearance model, a method for image detection, using statistical models
- Advanced Air Mobility, a system of air-based transportation
- Air-to-air missile, a missile fired from an aircraft to attack another aircraft
- ASCII Adjust after Multiplication, computer instruction in Intel BCD opcodes#Multiplication
- Atmospheric angular momentum, the measure of the rotation of the atmosphere around the north–south axis of the Earth; see Day length fluctuations
- Automatic acoustic management, a technology to reduce hard drive seek noise

== Other uses ==
- Aramanik language, an extinct language of Tanzania, ISO 639-3 designation
- Author Accepted Manuscript
- US Army Achievement Medal, awarded for meritorious service or achievement
