= ABM =

ABM or Abm may refer to:

== Arts and media ==
- ABM (video game), 1980 video game
- Atmospheric Black Metal

== Businesses and organizations ==
=== Businesses ===
- ABM Industries, a US facility management provider
- Advantage Business Media, a US digital marketing and information services company
- Associated British Maltsters, acquired by Dalgety plc
- Northern Peninsula Airport in Bamaga, State of Queensland, Australia (IATA airport code ABM)

=== Other organizations ===
- Abahlali baseMjondolo, a movement of South African shack dwellers
- Anglican Board of Mission - Australia, the national mission agency of the Anglican Church of Australia
- Ansar Bait al-Maqdis, an Egyptian jihadist group

== Science and technology ==
- Advanced Bit Manipulation, an instruction set extension for x86
- Agaricus blazei Murill, a species of mushroom
- Agent-based model, a computational model for simulating autonomous agents
- Anti-ballistic missile
- Asynchronous Balanced Mode, an HDLC communication mode
- Automated banking machine, Canadian term for automated teller machine

== Other uses ==
- Air Battle Manager, a US Air Force rated officer position
- Abanyom language of Nigeria, ISO 639-3 code
- Account-based marketing, strategic approach to business marketing
- Activity-based management, method of identifying and evaluating activities that a business performs
- Anti-Ballistic Missile Treaty, 1972 arms control treaty between the US and USSR
