= AFJ =

AFJ may refer to:

- Alliance of Fairness and Justice or Pan-Purple Coalition
- Alliance for Justice
- Armed Forces Journal
- Washington County Airport (Pennsylvania)
- A Flying Jatt, a Bollywood movie
