= AVM =

AVM may refer to:

== Medicine and biology ==
- Acute viral meningitis, inflammation of the protective membranes covering the brain and spinal cord, caused by a viral infection
- Arteriovenous malformation, a congenital disorder of the veins and arteries that make up the vascular system
  - Cerebral arteriovenous malformation, an abnormal connection of the veins and arteries in the brain
- Autophagic vacuolar myopathy, multiple rare genetic disorders with common histological and pathological features on muscle biopsy
- Avian vacuolar myelinopathy, a fatal neurological disease that affects various waterbirds and raptors

== Other uses ==
- ActionScript Virtual Machine, a component of Adobe Flash Player
- Adaptive Vehicle Make, a United States military project to design and manufacture defense systems and vehicles
- Adarsha Vidya Mandir, a school in Lalitpur, Nepal
- Air vice-marshal, a rank in the United Kingdom and many Commonwealth air forces
- Animation vs. Minecraft, a Minecraft-themed Animator vs. Animation spinoff video series produced by Alan Becker
- Associação Visão de Macau or Vision Macau, a political party in Macao
- Astronomy Visualization Metadata, a standard for tagging digital astronomical images with astronomical information
- Attribute value matrix, a compact notation in linguistics for listing attribute-value pairs describing a lexical entity
- Automated Valuation Model, a mathematical model for analysis of residential property
- Automatic vehicle monitoring, one of the applications of vehicle tracking systems
- AVM GmbH, a German manufacturer of broadband modems and consumer networking devices
- AVM Productions, a film production house in Tamil Nadu, India
  - A. V. Meiyappan, Indian filmmaker, founder of AVM Productions
- AVM Runestone, an archaeological forgery found in 2001 near Kensington, Minnesota
- MetroCity AVM, a modern shopping mall in Istanbul, Turkey
- A US Navy hull classification symbol: Guided missile ship (AVM)
