= AJD (disambiguation) =

AJD is a stochastic process.

AJD may also refer to:

- Accelerated JD program
- Astronomical Julian day
- All Japan Districts, one of the awards issued by the Japan Amateur Radio League
