= ACRI =

Acri may refer to:

- Acri, a town in the province of Cosenza, southern Italy
- Association for Civil Rights in Israel
- African Crisis Response Initiative, now African Contingency Operations Training and Assistance, a US training program
- American Committee for Relief in Ireland
- Associazione fra le Casse di Risparmio Italiane, now Associazione di Fondazioni e di Casse di Risparmio S.p.A., an Italian banking association

== People with the surname ==
- Bob Acri (1918–2013), American jazz pianist and composer

== See also ==
- Acre (disambiguation)
