= AMSO =

AMSO may refer to:

- American Shale Oil
- Army Modeling & Simulation Office
- Air Member for Supply and Organisation, now called Air Member for Materiel, in the Royal Air Force
