= AICD =

AICD may refer to:

- Automated Implantable Cardioverter-Defibrillator
- Amyloid precursor protein Intracellular Cytoplasmic/C-terminal Domain, the smaller cleavage product of APP by gamma-secretase
- Australian Institute of Company Directors, an organisation supporting company directors in Australia
- Activation-induced cell death (AICD), important for maintaining T cell homeostasis of the immune system. Autoreactive T cells undergo apoptosis through AICD both from the thymus and periphery
