= AFRC =

AFRC may refer to:

== Military ==
- Air Force Reserve Command, major command of the US Air Force
- Armed Forces Recreation Center, resorts run by the US Armed Forces for members of the military and their families
- Armed Forces Revolutionary Council, Ghana, ruled Ghana for 4 months in 1979
- Armed Forces Revolutionary Council, rebel group in Sierra Leone from 1997–2002

== Other uses ==
- Accounting and Financial Reporting Council, a statutory body charged with regulating the accounting profession in Hong Kong
- Advanced Frame Rate Converter, used for frame rate control
- Agricultural and Food Research Council, British farming and horticulture organisation
- Arkansas Forest Resource Center, University of Arkansas at Monticello, US
- Neil A. Armstrong Flight Research Center, a NASA center on Edwards Air Force Base in California, US

== See also ==
- Australian Family Relationships Clearinghouse Issues, aka AFRC Issues
- American Flame Research Committee, component of the International Flame Research Foundation
