= AGL =

AGL may refer to:

== Businesses ==
- AGL Energy, Australian energy company, successor to Australian Gas Light Company
- AGL Resources, an American utility company
  - Atlanta Gas Light, a subsidiary of AGL Resources
- Australian Gas Light Company, a former Australian energy company

== Science and technology ==
=== Biology ===
- AGL gene, which codes for human glycogen debranching enzyme
- amylo- α- 1,6- glucosidase, 4- α- glucanotransferase (AGL), another name for the glycogen debranching enzyme

=== Computing ===
- Adobe Glyph List, a list of glyph names for Unicode characters
- Apple Graphics Library, the Apple API for OpenGL
- Automotive Grade Linux, an open operating system and framework for automotive applications
- A Graphics Language, BASIC language extension for control of Hewlett-Packard plotters

=== Other uses in science and technology ===
- Affine general linear group, a group of affine transformations in mathematics
- Artificial grammar learning, an investigative technique in cognitive psychology and linguistics
- Automatic Grenade Launcher, weapon for shooting grenades rapidly

== Transport infrastructure ==
- Abergele & Pensarn railway station, UK (National Rail code AGL)
- Ampang Line, a rapid transit line in Malaysia
- Wanigela Airport in Oro Province, Papua New Guinea (IATA airport code AGL)

== Other uses ==
- Lighthouse tender (US Navy hull classification symbol AGL)
- Above ground level
- Angola (ITU letter code AGL)
- "Animism: the Gods' Lake", a fictional location in Animism (TV series)
- Fembe language of Papua New Guinea (ISO 639-3 code agl)
