= Adult Film Database =

Pornographic movie/actor website database

- Website type: Adult website
- Available in: English
- Website: adultfilmdatabase.com
- Launched: 1991 as Sodomite; 1999 as Adult Film Database
- Current status: Active

Screenshot of the homepage

The Adult Film Database (AFD) is an English-language adult website database that attempts to keep records of all pornographic movies and adult film stars. This include filmographies, partial biographies, reviews, labeled and categorized adult film stills, as well as a regularly updated adult industry blog which features the latest news about adult performers, movies, directors, studios, web site updates and sundry adult news from around the world.

== Founding and synopsis ==
It was created in 1991 under the name Sodomite by a college student. This was an attempt to fill the void of the temporary absence of the Internet Adult Film Database (IAFD) and as a project in web development. In 1999 its name was changed to the AdultFilmDatabase.com. Today, the AdultFilmDatabase.com is a major competitor to the Internet Adult Film Database.

Taking inspiration from both the Internet Adult Film Database and the mainstream Internet Movie Database and forging ties with industry mainstays like Vivid Entertainment, Hustler, Wicked and Digital Playground the AdultFilmDatabase.com features information on over 100,000 adult movies and 60,000 performers (updated March 2019).

Run by a husband and wife team, the Adult Film Database was the first online adult database to include both straight and gay videos and performers.

In October 2007, the Adult Film Database debunked rumors adult film performer Tamara Lee had died from AIDS. The news was covered by trade industry report magazine Adult Video News in an article on October 23, 2007.
