= Advanced Research and Assessment Group =

Department of the Defence Academy of the United Kingdom

Coordinates: 51°36′28.60″N 1°38′1.05″W

The Advanced Research and Assessment Group (ARAG) was a department of the Defence Academy of the United Kingdom concerned with long-term planning and threat assessment.

ARAG was established in 2005 by Chris Donnelly CMG, the former principal advisor to the NATO Secretary General. He realised that across the UK Ministry of Defence and wider government no organisation was either adaptable or innovative enough to research 21st Century security challenges. ARAG brought together experts from the military, academia and other fields in "research clusters" dedicated to specific areas of concern, in order to provide policy-makers with focussed analysis of international security issues. ARAG members were hand-picked and came from a wide background of skills, experience and nationalities. ARAG subsumed the Conflict Studies Research Centre, previously known as the Soviet Studies Research Centre, which for nearly 40 years had studied the Soviet Union, working in open source organic languages to supplement MoD and Intelligence Service assets. ARAG worked across government departments undertaking both directed and undirected research and broadening its reach to encompass new security challenges such as China, cyber security and strategic communication. It produced a large number of research papers - made freely available to the public from the Defence Academy website - as well as more targeted limited distribution work. Many of these papers became seminal reference works including Russia and The West: A Reassessment by Dr James Sherr, Charles Blandy's correct prediction of the Russian attack on Georgia, Professor James Pettifer's analysis of the Greek financial crisis and the joint paper by Major General Andrew Mackay and Commander Steve Tatham. Mackay is on public record as stating that ARAG was the only organisation in the MoD capable of helping him plan and write his operational design for his Brigade tour in Helmand Province, Afghanistan, in 2007. ARAG also administered the Defence Academy Reserve Cadre, a network of over 70 Reserve Forces personnel with unusual civilian skills sets or languages. The Cadre personnel were designed to augment regular forces and other government departments in providing specialist civilian skills in operational areas. They were also, at one point, the only part of the UK Defence Community directly assisting the UK Prevent agenda through their mentoring at the Active Change Foundation. The cadre was described by then Vice Chief of Defence Staff General Sir Timothy Granville-Chapman as a 'work of genius'.

In 2007 Mr Donnelly handed management of ARAG to Dr Jamie MacIntosh, the former Special Advisor to the Home Secretary Dr John Reid. Dr MacIntosh was responsible for advising Dr Reid to split the functions of the Home Office – declaring that it was not 'fit for purpose'.

ARAG was renamed Research & Assessment Branch in late 2009 and, losing its own budget, incorporated into the Defence Academy's HQ Building - newly refurbished to accommodate them. Widely flagged as a means to preserve ARAG's capability, the Defence Academy's Director General, Lieutenant General Andrew Graham, told the staff that he was 'passionate about research' and that the capability was secure under his tenure. However less than three months later and despite having an annual budget of less than £1 million, ARAG was closed down in February 2010 by General Graham as a cost-saving measure. The move was widely condemned, with letters of protest being sent from government departments, the security services, former senior members of the US government, academia and other organisations. However ARAG and its new head had already made itself unpopular in Whitehall for pointing out the failures of government departments and agencies as part of their 'red-teaming' function. R&AB also made itself unpopular within the Defence Academy itself – suggesting that whilst over 300 military officers graduated each year from the JSCSC Staff Courses there was no measure of effectiveness of the courses and no way to measure their value for money. R&AB staff also pointed out inconsistencies and failings of the various contracts and PFIs that existed in the Defence Academy. For example, despite King's College London and SERCO receiving millions in public money, no online research papers were available to students - a basic research tool enjoyed by every other university in the UK - and basic administrative functions were hugely and disproportionately expensive. As a consequence many senior officers were reluctant to make a case for its retention. The comments from King's College London Staff were particularly revealing. The BBC featured its demise, twice, in The World at One on 3 Feb 2010 and a large number of PQs were raised by various MPs. The answers provided by the then Minister for the Armed Forces, Bill Rammell, were confused and suggested that ARAG's functions would be handed to other organisations - a clear breach of negotiated Union arrangements and as such the basis of an ongoing dispute between the Defence Academy and the Prospect Union. Since the vast majority of ARAG and R&AB's work was undertaken in organic language analysis, it is unclear how such functions could be fulfilled by King's College London or Cranfield University. In discussions with staff after the decision it became apparent that the senior management of the Defence Academy were unaware of much of the work R&AB had undertaken - a failing that a number of the staff attributed to firstly Dr Macintosh, who in 2009 had inexplicably ceased the publication of all R&AB papers for nearly one year, and secondly to Lt General Graham who has taken a far less hands on approach with Defence Academy business than his predecessor Lieutenant General John Kiszely, who had been actively involved in a number of ARAGs projects - instead creating a new 1 Star post (Army Brigadier Sean Crane) to help oversee the Academy's multimillion-pound business.

With no tangible written output for nearly a year, Brigadier Crane questioned the worth of the unit and its Head was apparently unable to make a case for its retention. At its close the 25 full-time R&AB staff spoke 27 languages and administered a distributed global network of associates and subject matter experts of over 5000 people world-wide. All of R&AB's civil servants joined the MoD re-deployment pool whilst its long standing contractors - Persian, Arabic and Russian analysts - were laid off. R&AB's network of experts was dismantled. No other comparable organisation exists in the Western world. The Reserve Cadre was also disbanded at the same time.

In April 2010 Dr Macintosh was loaned by the MoD to a new crisis and resilience research centre at University College London founded by Dr John Reid for a period of three years. A number of the new centre's functions (Quote: the institute will encompass themes such as behaviour, capacity, media, strategy and development unquote) exactly mirror those of the former R&AB, leading to further accusations that the MoD still requires the functions formally provided by R&AB.
