= African Aurora Business Network =

Ghanaian non-governmental organization

African Aurora Business Network, abbreviated as AABN, is an enterprise development non-governmental Organization headquartered in Accra, Ghana. The organization assists micro and small scale enterprises (MSEs) and its environment through partnerships, capacity building, creative products and advisory services.

== History ==
AABN was established in 1999 and in 2001 registered by guarantee as a limited liability company in Ghana. AABN has provided business development services for government institutions such as the Ministry of Trade and Industry and Private Sector Development and the Ministry of Women and Children Affairs under the UNDP Gender Programme. They also implemented projects for the International Labour Organisation as well as various clients in Ghana.

Their work also focuses on employment opportunities for university graduates.
