= List of minor planets: 747001–748000 =

The following is a partial list of minor planets, running from minor-planet number 747001 through 748000, inclusive. The primary data for this and other partial lists is based on JPL's "Small-Body Orbital Elements" and data available from the Minor Planet Center. Critical list information is also provided by the MPC, unless otherwise specified from Lowell Observatory. A detailed description of the table's columns and additional sources are given on the main page including a complete list of every page in this series, and a statistical break-up on the dynamical classification of minor planets.

Also see the summary list of all named bodies in numerical and alphabetical order, and the corresponding naming citations for the number range of this particular list. New namings may only be added to this list after official publication, as the preannouncement of names is condemned by the Working Group for Small Bodies Nomenclature of the International Astronomical Union.

Near-Earth obj.	MBA (inner)	MBA (outer)	Centaur
Mars-crosser	MBA (middle)	Jupiter trojan	Trans-Neptunian obj.
Unclassified

== 747001–747100 ==
Designation			Discovery			Properties		Ref
Permanent	Provisional	Named after	Date	Site	Discoverer(s)	Category	Diam.	Ref
747001	2012 OR_{1}	—	May 27, 2012	Mount Lemmon	Mount Lemmon Survey	·	880 m	MPC · JPL
747002	2012 OX_{1}	—	July 22, 2012	Alder Springs	Levin, K.	·	2.6 km	MPC · JPL
747003	2012 OP_{2}	—	July 24, 2012	Oukaïmeden	C. Rinner	·	2.9 km	MPC · JPL
747004	2012 OK_{5}	—	July 28, 2012	Haleakala	Pan-STARRS 1	THB	2.6 km	MPC · JPL
747005	2012 OL_{5}	—	July 28, 2012	Haleakala	Pan-STARRS 1	·	1.7 km	MPC · JPL
747006	2012 OT_{6}	—	August 12, 2004	Palomar	NEAT	·	690 m	MPC · JPL
747007	2012 OX_{6}	—	August 12, 2001	Palomar	NEAT	·	3.2 km	MPC · JPL
747008	2012 OZ_{6}	—	December 29, 2014	Haleakala	Pan-STARRS 1	·	3.0 km	MPC · JPL
747009	2012 PU	—	August 7, 2012	Marly	Kocher, F.	·	3.1 km	MPC · JPL
747010	2012 PV_{2}	—	August 8, 2012	Haleakala	Pan-STARRS 1	·	1.6 km	MPC · JPL
747011	2012 PG_{6}	—	August 10, 2012	La Sagra	OAM	ATE	320 m	MPC · JPL
747012	2012 PC_{7}	—	August 8, 2012	Haleakala	Pan-STARRS 1	·	1.7 km	MPC · JPL
747013	2012 PG_{7}	—	August 8, 2012	Haleakala	Pan-STARRS 1	·	3.2 km	MPC · JPL
747014	2012 PQ_{9}	—	August 8, 2012	Haleakala	Pan-STARRS 1	NAE	1.8 km	MPC · JPL
747015	2012 PF_{10}	—	September 12, 2007	Mount Lemmon	Mount Lemmon Survey	·	2.1 km	MPC · JPL
747016	2012 PA_{14}	—	February 1, 2009	Kitt Peak	Spacewatch	T_{j} (2.98)	3.4 km	MPC · JPL
747017	2012 PY_{16}	—	August 12, 2012	Haleakala	Pan-STARRS 1	L5	8.2 km	MPC · JPL
747018	2012 PC_{17}	—	February 10, 2011	Mount Lemmon	Mount Lemmon Survey	·	870 m	MPC · JPL
747019	2012 PY_{20}	—	August 13, 2012	Haleakala	Pan-STARRS 1	·	880 m	MPC · JPL
747020	2012 PG_{21}	—	March 29, 2011	Mount Lemmon	Mount Lemmon Survey	·	1.1 km	MPC · JPL
747021	2012 PC_{22}	—	August 13, 2012	Haleakala	Pan-STARRS 1	·	2.7 km	MPC · JPL
747022	2012 PW_{22}	—	October 15, 2001	Apache Point	SDSS	·	2.5 km	MPC · JPL
747023	2012 PW_{23}	—	August 13, 2012	Haleakala	Pan-STARRS 1	·	1.5 km	MPC · JPL
747024	2012 PF_{24}	—	August 25, 2000	Cerro Tololo	Deep Ecliptic Survey	·	620 m	MPC · JPL
747025	2012 PM_{26}	—	August 13, 2012	Haleakala	Pan-STARRS 1	V	550 m	MPC · JPL
747026	2012 PR_{28}	—	May 22, 2005	Palomar	NEAT	·	520 m	MPC · JPL
747027	2012 PV_{31}	—	May 23, 2012	Mount Lemmon	Mount Lemmon Survey	PHO	820 m	MPC · JPL
747028	2012 PT_{34}	—	March 26, 2007	Mount Lemmon	Mount Lemmon Survey	·	1.2 km	MPC · JPL
747029	2012 PC_{35}	—	November 12, 2005	Kitt Peak	Spacewatch	·	950 m	MPC · JPL
747030	2012 PG_{36}	—	February 8, 2011	Mount Lemmon	Mount Lemmon Survey	·	1.4 km	MPC · JPL
747031	2012 PM_{38}	—	August 6, 2012	Haleakala	Pan-STARRS 1	·	990 m	MPC · JPL
747032	2012 PN_{39}	—	August 8, 2012	Haleakala	Pan-STARRS 1	·	1.5 km	MPC · JPL
747033	2012 PO_{40}	—	May 31, 2008	Mount Lemmon	Mount Lemmon Survey	·	1.1 km	MPC · JPL
747034	2012 PF_{43}	—	September 25, 2005	Kitt Peak	Spacewatch	·	830 m	MPC · JPL
747035	2012 PH_{45}	—	August 14, 2012	Haleakala	Pan-STARRS 1	·	1.1 km	MPC · JPL
747036	2012 PW_{45}	—	August 14, 2012	Haleakala	Pan-STARRS 1	NYS	1.0 km	MPC · JPL
747037	2012 PB_{46}	—	December 27, 2013	Mount Lemmon	Mount Lemmon Survey	PHO	900 m	MPC · JPL
747038	2012 PP_{46}	—	August 14, 2012	Haleakala	Pan-STARRS 1	·	1.0 km	MPC · JPL
747039	2012 PW_{46}	—	August 12, 2012	Kitt Peak	Spacewatch	L5	7.9 km	MPC · JPL
747040	2012 PX_{46}	—	August 2, 2016	Haleakala	Pan-STARRS 1	PHO	660 m	MPC · JPL
747041	2012 PO_{48}	—	August 10, 2012	Kitt Peak	Spacewatch	·	1 km	MPC · JPL
747042	2012 PV_{48}	—	August 13, 2012	Haleakala	Pan-STARRS 1	·	900 m	MPC · JPL
747043	2012 PE_{51}	—	February 20, 2015	Haleakala	Pan-STARRS 1	·	2.3 km	MPC · JPL
747044	2012 PV_{51}	—	August 12, 2012	Siding Spring	SSS	·	820 m	MPC · JPL
747045	2012 PJ_{52}	—	July 12, 2016	Mount Lemmon	Mount Lemmon Survey	·	1.0 km	MPC · JPL
747046	2012 PG_{53}	—	August 13, 2012	Haleakala	Pan-STARRS 1	·	2.3 km	MPC · JPL
747047	2012 PU_{55}	—	August 14, 2012	Haleakala	Pan-STARRS 1	·	940 m	MPC · JPL
747048	2012 PG_{57}	—	August 8, 2012	Haleakala	Pan-STARRS 1	·	1.3 km	MPC · JPL
747049	2012 QE_{1}	—	August 16, 2012	Tenerife	ESA OGS	·	2.4 km	MPC · JPL
747050	2012 QE_{3}	—	February 16, 2010	Mount Lemmon	Mount Lemmon Survey	HNS	890 m	MPC · JPL
747051	2012 QO_{6}	—	August 17, 2012	Haleakala	Pan-STARRS 1	·	2.7 km	MPC · JPL
747052	2012 QZ_{6}	—	August 14, 2012	Siding Spring	SSS	EUN	710 m	MPC · JPL
747053	2012 QE_{7}	—	December 30, 2005	Kitt Peak	Spacewatch	·	960 m	MPC · JPL
747054	2012 QW_{10}	—	September 20, 2008	Kitt Peak	Spacewatch	·	1.2 km	MPC · JPL
747055	2012 QC_{13}	—	August 19, 2006	Anderson Mesa	LONEOS	THB	2.5 km	MPC · JPL
747056	2012 QE_{14}	—	August 21, 2012	Westfield	R. Holmes	·	1.1 km	MPC · JPL
747057	2012 QJ_{21}	—	August 24, 2012	Catalina	CSS	·	1.1 km	MPC · JPL
747058	2012 QN_{23}	—	October 12, 2007	Kitt Peak	Spacewatch	·	1.8 km	MPC · JPL
747059	2012 QX_{25}	—	August 24, 2012	Kitt Peak	Spacewatch	L5	7.2 km	MPC · JPL
747060	2012 QG_{27}	—	August 24, 2012	Kitt Peak	Spacewatch	·	830 m	MPC · JPL
747061	2012 QQ_{30}	—	August 25, 2012	Kitt Peak	Spacewatch	·	2.4 km	MPC · JPL
747062	2012 QE_{32}	—	August 25, 2012	Kitt Peak	Spacewatch	·	850 m	MPC · JPL
747063	2012 QH_{35}	—	November 29, 2005	Kitt Peak	Spacewatch	·	1.0 km	MPC · JPL
747064	2012 QJ_{36}	—	August 25, 2012	Kitt Peak	Spacewatch	·	730 m	MPC · JPL
747065	2012 QE_{40}	—	August 26, 2012	Catalina	CSS	·	1.0 km	MPC · JPL
747066	2012 QP_{40}	—	August 11, 2012	Siding Spring	SSS	·	1.3 km	MPC · JPL
747067	2012 QL_{43}	—	August 12, 2012	Siding Spring	SSS	·	2.1 km	MPC · JPL
747068	2012 QV_{43}	—	August 14, 2012	Siding Spring	SSS	V	520 m	MPC · JPL
747069	2012 QY_{43}	—	August 17, 2012	Haleakala	Pan-STARRS 1	LIX	2.8 km	MPC · JPL
747070	2012 QX_{45}	—	May 6, 2006	Mount Lemmon	Mount Lemmon Survey	·	2.4 km	MPC · JPL
747071	2012 QY_{45}	—	August 16, 2012	Haleakala	Pan-STARRS 1	·	2.6 km	MPC · JPL
747072	2012 QZ_{48}	—	August 24, 2012	Kitt Peak	Spacewatch	·	1.1 km	MPC · JPL
747073	2012 QA_{51}	—	August 19, 2012	Siding Spring	SSS	THB	3.4 km	MPC · JPL
747074	2012 QB_{52}	—	August 25, 2012	Haleakala	Pan-STARRS 1	·	1.2 km	MPC · JPL
747075	2012 QC_{54}	—	August 16, 2012	Haleakala	Pan-STARRS 1	·	1.2 km	MPC · JPL
747076	2012 QB_{55}	—	January 2, 2014	Kitt Peak	Spacewatch	·	960 m	MPC · JPL
747077	2012 QJ_{56}	—	January 26, 2014	Catalina	CSS	·	1.0 km	MPC · JPL
747078	2012 QL_{56}	—	August 26, 2012	Haleakala	Pan-STARRS 1	·	1.6 km	MPC · JPL
747079	2012 QB_{57}	—	August 13, 2012	Kitt Peak	Spacewatch	·	2.7 km	MPC · JPL
747080	2012 QZ_{58}	—	August 17, 2012	Haleakala	Pan-STARRS 1	·	2.9 km	MPC · JPL
747081	2012 QD_{59}	—	September 21, 2018	Palomar	Zwicky Transient Facility	·	3.0 km	MPC · JPL
747082	2012 QG_{59}	—	December 11, 2013	Mount Lemmon	Mount Lemmon Survey	·	1.5 km	MPC · JPL
747083	2012 QY_{59}	—	August 26, 2012	Haleakala	Pan-STARRS 1	·	2.8 km	MPC · JPL
747084	2012 QW_{60}	—	April 20, 2017	Haleakala	Pan-STARRS 1	H	410 m	MPC · JPL
747085	2012 QZ_{61}	—	August 26, 2012	Haleakala	Pan-STARRS 1	·	1.4 km	MPC · JPL
747086	2012 QG_{64}	—	August 26, 2012	Kitt Peak	Spacewatch	EOS	1.5 km	MPC · JPL
747087	2012 QY_{64}	—	August 16, 2012	Alder Springs	Levin, K.	·	820 m	MPC · JPL
747088	2012 QV_{65}	—	August 25, 2012	Haleakala	Pan-STARRS 1	·	930 m	MPC · JPL
747089	2012 QA_{66}	—	August 26, 2012	Haleakala	Pan-STARRS 1	L5	7.1 km	MPC · JPL
747090	2012 QF_{66}	—	August 17, 2012	Haleakala	Pan-STARRS 1	EOS	1.6 km	MPC · JPL
747091	2012 QD_{67}	—	August 26, 2012	Haleakala	Pan-STARRS 1	·	890 m	MPC · JPL
747092	2012 QF_{69}	—	August 26, 2012	Haleakala	Pan-STARRS 1	L5	8.3 km	MPC · JPL
747093	2012 QW_{82}	—	August 25, 2012	Kitt Peak	Spacewatch	L5	7.1 km	MPC · JPL
747094	2012 RJ	—	September 4, 2012	Haleakala	Pan-STARRS 1	H	440 m	MPC · JPL
747095	2012 RM	—	May 8, 2008	Mount Lemmon	Mount Lemmon Survey	·	700 m	MPC · JPL
747096	2012 RH_{1}	—	August 14, 2012	Haleakala	Pan-STARRS 1	T_{j} (2.97)	2.8 km	MPC · JPL
747097	2012 RU_{7}	—	August 12, 2006	Palomar	NEAT	·	2.7 km	MPC · JPL
747098	2012 RW_{8}	—	March 30, 2011	Haleakala	Pan-STARRS 1	·	1.2 km	MPC · JPL
747099	2012 RG_{10}	—	August 25, 2012	Catalina	CSS	·	1.0 km	MPC · JPL
747100	2012 RF_{25}	—	August 24, 2001	Socorro	LINEAR	·	2.8 km	MPC · JPL

== 747101–747200 ==
back to top

Designation			Discovery			Properties		Ref
Permanent	Provisional	Named after	Date	Site	Discoverer(s)	Category	Diam.	Ref
747101	2012 RR_{27}	—	July 30, 2008	Mount Lemmon	Mount Lemmon Survey	·	830 m	MPC · JPL
747102	2012 RQ_{30}	—	September 6, 2012	Haleakala	Pan-STARRS 1	·	2.6 km	MPC · JPL
747103	2012 RO_{32}	—	March 4, 2011	Catalina	CSS	H	500 m	MPC · JPL
747104	2012 RV_{33}	—	September 15, 2012	Tenerife	ESA OGS	·	570 m	MPC · JPL
747105	2012 RA_{34}	—	August 26, 2012	Haleakala	Pan-STARRS 1	·	2.6 km	MPC · JPL
747106	2012 RJ_{34}	—	September 30, 2006	Mount Lemmon	Mount Lemmon Survey	·	2.8 km	MPC · JPL
747107	2012 RC_{35}	—	September 15, 2012	Kitt Peak	Spacewatch	·	3.0 km	MPC · JPL
747108	2012 RC_{45}	—	September 14, 2012	Catalina	CSS	LIX	3.1 km	MPC · JPL
747109	2012 RN_{47}	—	September 10, 2012	Westfield	R. Holmes	·	2.7 km	MPC · JPL
747110	2012 RT_{47}	—	September 15, 2012	Catalina	CSS	·	1.1 km	MPC · JPL
747111	2012 RK_{48}	—	September 15, 2012	Catalina	CSS	·	980 m	MPC · JPL
747112	2012 SH_{1}	—	September 16, 2012	Mount Lemmon	Mount Lemmon Survey	·	2.4 km	MPC · JPL
747113	2012 SN_{1}	—	August 25, 2012	Kitt Peak	Spacewatch	·	2.7 km	MPC · JPL
747114	2012 SV_{3}	—	October 20, 2007	Mount Lemmon	Mount Lemmon Survey	BRA	1.3 km	MPC · JPL
747115	2012 SL_{5}	—	September 7, 2008	Mount Lemmon	Mount Lemmon Survey	NYS	860 m	MPC · JPL
747116	2012 SA_{6}	—	January 25, 2003	La Silla	A. Boattini, Hainaut, O.	·	2.4 km	MPC · JPL
747117	2012 SD_{9}	—	October 6, 2008	Kitt Peak	Spacewatch	·	600 m	MPC · JPL
747118	2012 SF_{13}	—	March 18, 2002	Kitt Peak	Deep Ecliptic Survey	·	1.0 km	MPC · JPL
747119	2012 SD_{18}	—	September 22, 2008	Mount Lemmon	Mount Lemmon Survey	ADE	1.4 km	MPC · JPL
747120	2012 SQ_{24}	—	September 17, 2012	Mount Lemmon	Mount Lemmon Survey	L5	7.2 km	MPC · JPL
747121	2012 SF_{25}	—	September 17, 2012	Mount Lemmon	Mount Lemmon Survey	·	2.4 km	MPC · JPL
747122	2012 SW_{25}	—	September 17, 2012	Mount Lemmon	Mount Lemmon Survey	L5	7.2 km	MPC · JPL
747123	2012 SZ_{25}	—	September 17, 2012	Mount Lemmon	Mount Lemmon Survey	EOS	1.6 km	MPC · JPL
747124	2012 SN_{26}	—	September 17, 2012	Mount Lemmon	Mount Lemmon Survey	·	2.9 km	MPC · JPL
747125	2012 SV_{27}	—	September 18, 2012	Kitt Peak	Spacewatch	L5	7.5 km	MPC · JPL
747126	2012 SO_{28}	—	August 26, 2012	Kitt Peak	Spacewatch	·	2.7 km	MPC · JPL
747127	2012 SN_{30}	—	September 20, 2012	Mount Lemmon	Mount Lemmon Survey	APO	580 m	MPC · JPL
747128	2012 SY_{32}	—	September 17, 2012	Les Engarouines	L. Bernasconi	NYS	950 m	MPC · JPL
747129	2012 SK_{35}	—	September 23, 2008	Kitt Peak	Spacewatch	·	750 m	MPC · JPL
747130	2012 SC_{39}	—	September 18, 2012	Mount Lemmon	Mount Lemmon Survey	·	700 m	MPC · JPL
747131	2012 SM_{39}	—	December 4, 2008	Mount Lemmon	Mount Lemmon Survey	PAD	1.2 km	MPC · JPL
747132	2012 SO_{39}	—	August 23, 2012	Westfield	R. Holmes	·	2.7 km	MPC · JPL
747133	2012 SQ_{40}	—	September 18, 2012	Mount Lemmon	Mount Lemmon Survey	·	1.4 km	MPC · JPL
747134	2012 ST_{41}	—	August 1, 2008	Dauban	C. Rinner, F. Kugel	·	850 m	MPC · JPL
747135	2012 SO_{45}	—	September 21, 2012	Mount Lemmon	Mount Lemmon Survey	·	1.0 km	MPC · JPL
747136	2012 SA_{46}	—	September 22, 2012	Kitt Peak	Spacewatch	EUN	670 m	MPC · JPL
747137	2012 SJ_{49}	—	September 23, 2012	Mount Lemmon	Mount Lemmon Survey	·	860 m	MPC · JPL
747138	2012 SP_{59}	—	September 17, 2012	Mount Lemmon	Mount Lemmon Survey	·	1.4 km	MPC · JPL
747139	2012 SD_{67}	—	September 16, 2012	Mount Lemmon	Mount Lemmon Survey	H	590 m	MPC · JPL
747140	2012 SM_{68}	—	August 24, 2007	Kitt Peak	Spacewatch	AGN	1.0 km	MPC · JPL
747141	2012 SA_{70}	—	September 16, 2012	Kitt Peak	Spacewatch	·	2.4 km	MPC · JPL
747142	2012 SU_{70}	—	September 21, 2012	Kitt Peak	Spacewatch	(5)	820 m	MPC · JPL
747143	2012 SQ_{72}	—	January 22, 2015	Haleakala	Pan-STARRS 1	·	2.7 km	MPC · JPL
747144	2012 SR_{72}	—	September 27, 2012	Haleakala	Pan-STARRS 1	·	1.5 km	MPC · JPL
747145	2012 SC_{75}	—	September 27, 2012	Haleakala	Pan-STARRS 1	·	1.5 km	MPC · JPL
747146	2012 SG_{75}	—	January 2, 2000	Kitt Peak	Spacewatch	(1547)	1.2 km	MPC · JPL
747147	2012 SJ_{75}	—	May 20, 2015	Haleakala	Pan-STARRS 1	·	710 m	MPC · JPL
747148	2012 SV_{77}	—	September 21, 2012	Mount Lemmon	Mount Lemmon Survey	·	680 m	MPC · JPL
747149	2012 SB_{79}	—	August 27, 2006	Kitt Peak	Spacewatch	·	2.2 km	MPC · JPL
747150	2012 SJ_{80}	—	September 21, 2012	Catalina	CSS	T_{j} (2.99)	2.7 km	MPC · JPL
747151	2012 SZ_{80}	—	September 25, 2012	Mount Lemmon	Mount Lemmon Survey	L5	7.3 km	MPC · JPL
747152	2012 ST_{82}	—	September 21, 2012	Mount Lemmon	Mount Lemmon Survey	·	2.5 km	MPC · JPL
747153	2012 SM_{86}	—	September 22, 2012	Kitt Peak	Spacewatch	·	670 m	MPC · JPL
747154	2012 SM_{88}	—	September 24, 2012	Mount Lemmon	Mount Lemmon Survey	·	690 m	MPC · JPL
747155	2012 SW_{88}	—	September 24, 2012	Mount Lemmon	Mount Lemmon Survey	·	830 m	MPC · JPL
747156	2012 SV_{89}	—	September 25, 2012	Mount Lemmon	Mount Lemmon Survey	L5	6.3 km	MPC · JPL
747157	2012 SL_{90}	—	September 17, 2012	Mount Lemmon	Mount Lemmon Survey	L5	6.5 km	MPC · JPL
747158	2012 SW_{92}	—	September 25, 2012	Kitt Peak	Spacewatch	L5	6.4 km	MPC · JPL
747159	2012 SC_{93}	—	September 25, 2012	Kitt Peak	Spacewatch	·	1.6 km	MPC · JPL
747160	2012 SD_{93}	—	September 22, 2012	Kitt Peak	Spacewatch	L5	7.5 km	MPC · JPL
747161	2012 SS_{93}	—	September 18, 2012	Mount Lemmon	Mount Lemmon Survey	L5	6.8 km	MPC · JPL
747162	2012 SP_{101}	—	September 24, 2012	Mount Lemmon	Mount Lemmon Survey	L5	8.3 km	MPC · JPL
747163	2012 SD_{102}	—	September 24, 2012	Mount Lemmon	Mount Lemmon Survey	L5	6.7 km	MPC · JPL
747164	2012 TT	—	October 4, 2012	Haleakala	Pan-STARRS 1	APO +1km	880 m	MPC · JPL
747165	2012 TH_{3}	—	October 7, 2008	Mount Lemmon	Mount Lemmon Survey	·	570 m	MPC · JPL
747166	2012 TP_{4}	—	October 5, 2012	Haleakala	Pan-STARRS 1	L5	10 km	MPC · JPL
747167	2012 TU_{7}	—	September 16, 2012	Mount Lemmon	Mount Lemmon Survey	·	610 m	MPC · JPL
747168	2012 TK_{13}	—	October 6, 2012	Haleakala	Pan-STARRS 1	·	1.2 km	MPC · JPL
747169	2012 TN_{14}	—	October 7, 2012	Haleakala	Pan-STARRS 1	L5	7.1 km	MPC · JPL
747170	2012 TR_{15}	—	September 16, 2012	Nogales	M. Schwartz, P. R. Holvorcem	H	560 m	MPC · JPL
747171	2012 TD_{17}	—	September 15, 2012	Tenerife	ESA OGS	ARM	2.6 km	MPC · JPL
747172	2012 TN_{18}	—	September 26, 2008	Kitt Peak	Spacewatch	·	830 m	MPC · JPL
747173	2012 TP_{18}	—	September 14, 2012	Kitt Peak	Spacewatch	·	2.2 km	MPC · JPL
747174	2012 TA_{19}	—	October 6, 2012	Haleakala	Pan-STARRS 1	·	2.7 km	MPC · JPL
747175	2012 TB_{20}	—	October 7, 2012	Haleakala	Pan-STARRS 1	L5	8.8 km	MPC · JPL
747176	2012 TS_{20}	—	January 29, 2011	Mayhill-ISON	L. Elenin	H	570 m	MPC · JPL
747177	2012 TN_{24}	—	October 31, 2002	Palomar	NEAT	·	1.2 km	MPC · JPL
747178	2012 TU_{28}	—	October 4, 2012	Mount Lemmon	Mount Lemmon Survey	·	940 m	MPC · JPL
747179	2012 TN_{33}	—	September 23, 2012	Kitt Peak	Spacewatch	·	2.9 km	MPC · JPL
747180	2012 TV_{34}	—	September 11, 2012	Siding Spring	SSS	·	1.3 km	MPC · JPL
747181	2012 TG_{45}	—	October 8, 2012	Mount Lemmon	Mount Lemmon Survey	·	2.8 km	MPC · JPL
747182	2012 TO_{53}	—	February 14, 2010	Mount Lemmon	Mount Lemmon Survey	MAS	600 m	MPC · JPL
747183	2012 TD_{58}	—	October 7, 2012	Oukaïmeden	C. Rinner	·	1.5 km	MPC · JPL
747184	2012 TQ_{58}	—	November 25, 2009	Kitt Peak	Spacewatch	·	610 m	MPC · JPL
747185	2012 TF_{61}	—	September 23, 2008	Kitt Peak	Spacewatch	·	980 m	MPC · JPL
747186	2012 TQ_{65}	—	September 23, 2008	Kitt Peak	Spacewatch	·	720 m	MPC · JPL
747187	2012 TQ_{68}	—	October 8, 2012	Mount Lemmon	Mount Lemmon Survey	·	2.2 km	MPC · JPL
747188	2012 TH_{71}	—	October 9, 2012	Mayhill	Falla, N.	·	2.4 km	MPC · JPL
747189	2012 TB_{72}	—	October 9, 2012	Haleakala	Pan-STARRS 1	·	760 m	MPC · JPL
747190	2012 TR_{76}	—	October 9, 2012	Haleakala	Pan-STARRS 1	·	800 m	MPC · JPL
747191	2012 TT_{77}	—	October 9, 2012	Haleakala	Pan-STARRS 1	·	2.6 km	MPC · JPL
747192	2012 TW_{77}	—	October 25, 2008	Kitt Peak	Spacewatch	HNS	940 m	MPC · JPL
747193	2012 TM_{78}	—	January 9, 1997	Kitt Peak	Spacewatch	·	1.8 km	MPC · JPL
747194	2012 TK_{84}	—	August 26, 2003	Cerro Tololo	Deep Ecliptic Survey	·	1.2 km	MPC · JPL
747195	2012 TF_{88}	—	April 5, 2010	Mount Lemmon	Mount Lemmon Survey	NAE	1.8 km	MPC · JPL
747196	2012 TA_{95}	—	October 8, 2012	Kitt Peak	Spacewatch	·	880 m	MPC · JPL
747197	2012 TC_{102}	—	October 6, 2012	Mount Lemmon	Mount Lemmon Survey	MAS	570 m	MPC · JPL
747198	2012 TT_{102}	—	October 21, 2001	Socorro	LINEAR	·	960 m	MPC · JPL
747199	2012 TX_{105}	—	October 9, 2012	Mount Lemmon	Mount Lemmon Survey	HOF	2.2 km	MPC · JPL
747200	2012 TF_{111}	—	April 19, 2007	Kitt Peak	Spacewatch	·	900 m	MPC · JPL

== 747201–747300 ==
back to top

Designation			Discovery			Properties		Ref
Permanent	Provisional	Named after	Date	Site	Discoverer(s)	Category	Diam.	Ref
747201	2012 TN_{112}	—	October 10, 2012	Mount Lemmon	Mount Lemmon Survey	·	2.0 km	MPC · JPL
747202	2012 TN_{116}	—	November 18, 2003	Kitt Peak	Spacewatch	·	1.5 km	MPC · JPL
747203	2012 TQ_{118}	—	September 6, 2008	Mount Lemmon	Mount Lemmon Survey	·	960 m	MPC · JPL
747204	2012 TV_{122}	—	April 23, 2009	Mount Lemmon	Mount Lemmon Survey	L5	7.3 km	MPC · JPL
747205	2012 TW_{122}	—	October 8, 2012	Haleakala	Pan-STARRS 1	L5	7.5 km	MPC · JPL
747206	2012 TD_{124}	—	October 9, 2012	Mount Lemmon	Mount Lemmon Survey	L5	6.2 km	MPC · JPL
747207	2012 TW_{127}	—	May 7, 2006	Kitt Peak	Spacewatch	·	1.4 km	MPC · JPL
747208	2012 TL_{128}	—	October 14, 2004	Kitt Peak	Spacewatch	·	670 m	MPC · JPL
747209	2012 TR_{129}	—	April 3, 2011	Haleakala	Pan-STARRS 1	V	550 m	MPC · JPL
747210	2012 TV_{132}	—	September 16, 2012	Kitt Peak	Spacewatch	V	530 m	MPC · JPL
747211	2012 TY_{134}	—	October 6, 2008	Mount Lemmon	Mount Lemmon Survey	·	700 m	MPC · JPL
747212	2012 TZ_{137}	—	December 3, 2008	Mount Lemmon	Mount Lemmon Survey	·	780 m	MPC · JPL
747213	2012 TF_{140}	—	October 11, 2012	Haleakala	Pan-STARRS 1	L5	7.7 km	MPC · JPL
747214	2012 TN_{143}	—	September 22, 2012	Kitt Peak	Spacewatch	L5	6.4 km	MPC · JPL
747215	2012 TA_{146}	—	October 14, 2012	Mount Lemmon	Mount Lemmon Survey	L5	7.5 km	MPC · JPL
747216	2012 TK_{146}	—	October 12, 2012	Observatorio Cala	B. Linero, I. de la Cueva	·	890 m	MPC · JPL
747217	2012 TZ_{148}	—	October 8, 2012	Haleakala	Pan-STARRS 1	NAE	1.8 km	MPC · JPL
747218	2012 TH_{150}	—	September 16, 2012	Mount Lemmon	Mount Lemmon Survey	·	1.5 km	MPC · JPL
747219	2012 TV_{150}	—	September 28, 2008	Mount Lemmon	Mount Lemmon Survey	·	970 m	MPC · JPL
747220	2012 TJ_{152}	—	October 17, 2007	Mount Lemmon	Mount Lemmon Survey	THM	2.0 km	MPC · JPL
747221	2012 TD_{153}	—	March 29, 2011	Mount Lemmon	Mount Lemmon Survey	NYS	690 m	MPC · JPL
747222	2012 TM_{155}	—	September 22, 2012	Kitt Peak	Spacewatch	·	1.3 km	MPC · JPL
747223	2012 TQ_{161}	—	October 8, 2012	Haleakala	Pan-STARRS 1	·	480 m	MPC · JPL
747224	2012 TS_{164}	—	September 22, 2012	Kitt Peak	Spacewatch	L5	7.0 km	MPC · JPL
747225	2012 TS_{166}	—	January 28, 2006	Mount Lemmon	Mount Lemmon Survey	·	870 m	MPC · JPL
747226	2012 TW_{167}	—	September 26, 2008	Kitt Peak	Spacewatch	·	790 m	MPC · JPL
747227	2012 TT_{170}	—	September 25, 2012	Catalina	CSS	·	1.4 km	MPC · JPL
747228	2012 TV_{173}	—	October 9, 2012	Mount Lemmon	Mount Lemmon Survey	L5	7.4 km	MPC · JPL
747229	2012 TD_{175}	—	October 9, 2012	Mount Lemmon	Mount Lemmon Survey	·	1.3 km	MPC · JPL
747230	2012 TM_{178}	—	October 8, 2012	Mount Lemmon	Mount Lemmon Survey	L5	6.2 km	MPC · JPL
747231	2012 TK_{180}	—	October 9, 2012	Haleakala	Pan-STARRS 1	·	1.1 km	MPC · JPL
747232	2012 TT_{182}	—	September 25, 2012	Kitt Peak	Spacewatch	·	1.3 km	MPC · JPL
747233	2012 TE_{187}	—	April 26, 2006	Cerro Tololo	Deep Ecliptic Survey	·	1.2 km	MPC · JPL
747234	2012 TO_{189}	—	September 15, 2012	Kitt Peak	Spacewatch	·	360 m	MPC · JPL
747235	2012 TO_{190}	—	September 16, 2012	Mount Lemmon	Mount Lemmon Survey	·	1.1 km	MPC · JPL
747236	2012 TY_{190}	—	October 10, 2012	Kitt Peak	Spacewatch	·	1.2 km	MPC · JPL
747237	2012 TA_{191}	—	October 10, 2012	Mount Lemmon	Mount Lemmon Survey	·	2.4 km	MPC · JPL
747238	2012 TV_{191}	—	October 10, 2012	Mount Lemmon	Mount Lemmon Survey	·	2.3 km	MPC · JPL
747239	2012 TN_{195}	—	October 10, 2012	Mount Lemmon	Mount Lemmon Survey	EOS	1.4 km	MPC · JPL
747240	2012 TP_{196}	—	October 10, 2012	Mount Lemmon	Mount Lemmon Survey	EOS	1.5 km	MPC · JPL
747241	2012 TD_{197}	—	October 25, 2008	Kitt Peak	Spacewatch	·	770 m	MPC · JPL
747242	2012 TP_{197}	—	October 10, 2012	Kitt Peak	Spacewatch	·	1.1 km	MPC · JPL
747243	2012 TL_{198}	—	March 18, 2009	Catalina	CSS	·	3.5 km	MPC · JPL
747244	2012 TM_{200}	—	September 18, 2012	Kitt Peak	Spacewatch	·	830 m	MPC · JPL
747245	2012 TB_{202}	—	October 11, 2012	Mount Lemmon	Mount Lemmon Survey	L5	7.4 km	MPC · JPL
747246	2012 TL_{205}	—	October 11, 2012	Mount Lemmon	Mount Lemmon Survey	·	2.6 km	MPC · JPL
747247	2012 TK_{211}	—	September 23, 2008	Mount Lemmon	Mount Lemmon Survey	·	780 m	MPC · JPL
747248	2012 TD_{216}	—	September 17, 2012	Nogales	M. Schwartz, P. R. Holvorcem	EUN	890 m	MPC · JPL
747249	2012 TU_{220}	—	October 9, 2008	Mount Lemmon	Mount Lemmon Survey	·	600 m	MPC · JPL
747250	2012 TP_{223}	—	January 20, 2006	Kitt Peak	Spacewatch	·	1.0 km	MPC · JPL
747251	2012 TW_{224}	—	March 17, 2007	Kitt Peak	Spacewatch	L5	7.1 km	MPC · JPL
747252	2012 TJ_{231}	—	October 7, 2012	Haleakala	Pan-STARRS 1	·	1.0 km	MPC · JPL
747253	2012 TX_{234}	—	September 23, 2008	Mount Lemmon	Mount Lemmon Survey	·	720 m	MPC · JPL
747254	2012 TH_{235}	—	October 7, 2012	Haleakala	Pan-STARRS 1	(5)	800 m	MPC · JPL
747255	2012 TB_{238}	—	October 7, 2012	Haleakala	Pan-STARRS 1	·	2.4 km	MPC · JPL
747256	2012 TE_{239}	—	October 29, 2008	Kitt Peak	Spacewatch	·	1.3 km	MPC · JPL
747257	2012 TQ_{239}	—	September 17, 2012	Kitt Peak	Spacewatch	·	2.7 km	MPC · JPL
747258	2012 TU_{242}	—	October 1, 2008	Kitt Peak	Spacewatch	·	670 m	MPC · JPL
747259	2012 TJ_{244}	—	October 6, 2008	Mount Lemmon	Mount Lemmon Survey	RAF	680 m	MPC · JPL
747260	2012 TU_{245}	—	September 14, 2007	Kitt Peak	Spacewatch	·	1.4 km	MPC · JPL
747261	2012 TE_{246}	—	June 23, 2012	Mount Lemmon	Mount Lemmon Survey	NYS	1.0 km	MPC · JPL
747262	2012 TW_{247}	—	September 15, 2012	Mount Lemmon	Mount Lemmon Survey	MAS	610 m	MPC · JPL
747263	2012 TS_{249}	—	October 11, 2012	Haleakala	Pan-STARRS 1	HNS	960 m	MPC · JPL
747264	2012 TW_{249}	—	June 7, 2011	Haleakala	Pan-STARRS 1	·	1.4 km	MPC · JPL
747265	2012 TX_{251}	—	October 11, 2012	Haleakala	Pan-STARRS 1	EOS	1.4 km	MPC · JPL
747266	2012 TG_{252}	—	October 11, 2012	Haleakala	Pan-STARRS 1	·	800 m	MPC · JPL
747267	2012 TR_{253}	—	October 11, 2012	Haleakala	Pan-STARRS 1	·	1.0 km	MPC · JPL
747268	2012 TU_{255}	—	August 26, 2012	Haleakala	Pan-STARRS 1	·	520 m	MPC · JPL
747269	2012 TK_{257}	—	October 14, 2012	Catalina	CSS	·	2.0 km	MPC · JPL
747270	2012 TX_{257}	—	October 8, 2012	Haleakala	Pan-STARRS 1	·	640 m	MPC · JPL
747271	2012 TD_{259}	—	October 9, 2007	Mount Lemmon	Mount Lemmon Survey	EOS	1.5 km	MPC · JPL
747272	2012 TU_{260}	—	October 7, 2012	Haleakala	Pan-STARRS 1	·	2.4 km	MPC · JPL
747273	2012 TP_{261}	—	October 8, 2012	Mount Lemmon	Mount Lemmon Survey	L5	6.5 km	MPC · JPL
747274	2012 TO_{262}	—	October 8, 2012	Kitt Peak	Spacewatch	THM	1.6 km	MPC · JPL
747275	2012 TM_{263}	—	October 8, 2012	Mount Lemmon	Mount Lemmon Survey	L5	6.8 km	MPC · JPL
747276	2012 TR_{266}	—	September 23, 2008	Mount Lemmon	Mount Lemmon Survey	·	1.0 km	MPC · JPL
747277	2012 TJ_{267}	—	August 10, 2007	Kitt Peak	Spacewatch	·	1.5 km	MPC · JPL
747278	2012 TO_{267}	—	October 8, 2012	Haleakala	Pan-STARRS 1	(69559)	3.0 km	MPC · JPL
747279	2012 TN_{269}	—	March 11, 2007	Kitt Peak	Spacewatch	L5	8.4 km	MPC · JPL
747280	2012 TY_{270}	—	September 15, 2012	Kitt Peak	Spacewatch	HYG	2.3 km	MPC · JPL
747281	2012 TG_{273}	—	October 15, 2012	Mount Lemmon	Mount Lemmon Survey	·	1.2 km	MPC · JPL
747282	2012 TL_{276}	—	November 6, 2008	Mount Lemmon	Mount Lemmon Survey	·	910 m	MPC · JPL
747283	2012 TM_{277}	—	September 21, 2012	Kitt Peak	Spacewatch	·	760 m	MPC · JPL
747284	2012 TB_{279}	—	May 12, 2011	Mount Lemmon	Mount Lemmon Survey	·	1.1 km	MPC · JPL
747285	2012 TN_{281}	—	October 11, 2012	Mount Lemmon	Mount Lemmon Survey	·	1.5 km	MPC · JPL
747286	2012 TV_{281}	—	October 11, 2012	Mount Lemmon	Mount Lemmon Survey	·	1.1 km	MPC · JPL
747287	2012 TG_{284}	—	October 15, 2012	Mount Lemmon	Mount Lemmon Survey	·	840 m	MPC · JPL
747288	2012 TC_{287}	—	September 23, 2008	Kitt Peak	Spacewatch	EUN	710 m	MPC · JPL
747289	2012 TM_{287}	—	October 10, 2012	Mount Lemmon	Mount Lemmon Survey	·	2.8 km	MPC · JPL
747290	2012 TN_{287}	—	October 10, 2012	Mount Lemmon	Mount Lemmon Survey	EOS	1.7 km	MPC · JPL
747291	2012 TY_{288}	—	October 10, 2012	Mount Lemmon	Mount Lemmon Survey	·	2.6 km	MPC · JPL
747292	2012 TE_{290}	—	October 14, 2012	Catalina	CSS	·	2.5 km	MPC · JPL
747293	2012 TB_{293}	—	October 6, 2012	Kitt Peak	Spacewatch	·	1.1 km	MPC · JPL
747294	2012 TX_{295}	—	September 15, 2012	Catalina	CSS	·	1.0 km	MPC · JPL
747295	2012 TP_{296}	—	October 15, 2012	Kitt Peak	Spacewatch	·	2.2 km	MPC · JPL
747296	2012 TD_{298}	—	May 12, 2010	Mount Lemmon	Mount Lemmon Survey	·	1.4 km	MPC · JPL
747297	2012 TZ_{300}	—	October 26, 2008	Mount Lemmon	Mount Lemmon Survey	·	740 m	MPC · JPL
747298	2012 TL_{302}	—	September 7, 2008	Mount Lemmon	Mount Lemmon Survey	·	1.1 km	MPC · JPL
747299	2012 TZ_{304}	—	October 24, 2005	Anderson Mesa	LONEOS	·	790 m	MPC · JPL
747300	2012 TE_{308}	—	October 10, 2012	Haleakala	Pan-STARRS 1	·	2.0 km	MPC · JPL

== 747301–747400 ==
back to top

Designation			Discovery			Properties		Ref
Permanent	Provisional	Named after	Date	Site	Discoverer(s)	Category	Diam.	Ref
747301	2012 TM_{310}	—	October 13, 2012	Nogales	M. Schwartz, P. R. Holvorcem	T_{j} (2.97) · 3:2	5.0 km	MPC · JPL
747302	2012 TP_{310}	—	October 10, 2001	Palomar	NEAT	·	1.1 km	MPC · JPL
747303	2012 TP_{312}	—	October 14, 2012	Nogales	M. Schwartz, P. R. Holvorcem	·	1.6 km	MPC · JPL
747304	2012 TO_{315}	—	September 26, 2012	Catalina	CSS	·	2.7 km	MPC · JPL
747305	2012 TP_{317}	—	October 8, 2008	Kitt Peak	Spacewatch	·	750 m	MPC · JPL
747306	2012 TN_{325}	—	October 15, 2012	Mount Lemmon	Mount Lemmon Survey	EOS	1.2 km	MPC · JPL
747307	2012 TO_{325}	—	October 5, 2012	Haleakala	Pan-STARRS 1	·	850 m	MPC · JPL
747308	2012 TY_{329}	—	October 13, 2012	Kitt Peak	Spacewatch	·	2.6 km	MPC · JPL
747309	2012 TL_{332}	—	October 6, 2012	Haleakala	Pan-STARRS 1	·	3.1 km	MPC · JPL
747310	2012 TM_{332}	—	May 20, 2015	Haleakala	Pan-STARRS 1	EUN	980 m	MPC · JPL
747311	2012 TU_{332}	—	August 27, 2003	Palomar	NEAT	·	1.4 km	MPC · JPL
747312	2012 TZ_{332}	—	February 24, 2014	Haleakala	Pan-STARRS 1	·	1.1 km	MPC · JPL
747313	2012 TM_{333}	—	January 31, 2014	Haleakala	Pan-STARRS 1	·	1.1 km	MPC · JPL
747314	2012 TC_{334}	—	August 1, 2016	Haleakala	Pan-STARRS 1	MAR	800 m	MPC · JPL
747315	2012 TG_{334}	—	October 8, 2012	Mount Lemmon	Mount Lemmon Survey	AGN	830 m	MPC · JPL
747316	2012 TC_{335}	—	October 9, 2012	Mount Lemmon	Mount Lemmon Survey	·	940 m	MPC · JPL
747317	2012 TR_{337}	—	February 28, 2014	Haleakala	Pan-STARRS 1	MAR	780 m	MPC · JPL
747318	2012 TE_{338}	—	October 11, 2012	Mount Lemmon	Mount Lemmon Survey	EUN	880 m	MPC · JPL
747319	2012 TO_{339}	—	October 31, 2008	Kitt Peak	Spacewatch	EUN	930 m	MPC · JPL
747320	2012 TG_{343}	—	October 13, 2012	Siding Spring	SSS	T_{j} (2.97)	3.2 km	MPC · JPL
747321	2012 TL_{343}	—	November 27, 2017	Mount Lemmon	Mount Lemmon Survey	(1547)	1.4 km	MPC · JPL
747322	2012 TV_{344}	—	October 11, 2012	Haleakala	Pan-STARRS 1	·	2.9 km	MPC · JPL
747323	2012 TT_{345}	—	October 8, 2012	Mount Lemmon	Mount Lemmon Survey	L5	6.6 km	MPC · JPL
747324	2012 TK_{346}	—	October 23, 2016	Mount Lemmon	Mount Lemmon Survey	PHO	750 m	MPC · JPL
747325	2012 TP_{346}	—	October 10, 2012	Haleakala	Pan-STARRS 1	·	2.7 km	MPC · JPL
747326	2012 TQ_{347}	—	October 11, 2012	Kitt Peak	Spacewatch	·	1.5 km	MPC · JPL
747327	2012 TK_{350}	—	April 25, 2015	Haleakala	Pan-STARRS 1	·	930 m	MPC · JPL
747328	2012 TV_{350}	—	October 11, 2012	Haleakala	Pan-STARRS 1	L5	7.9 km	MPC · JPL
747329	2012 TW_{350}	—	February 27, 2017	Haleakala	Pan-STARRS 1	L5	7.2 km	MPC · JPL
747330	2012 TK_{351}	—	October 12, 2013	Kitt Peak	Spacewatch	L5	7.4 km	MPC · JPL
747331	2012 TA_{352}	—	October 9, 2012	Haleakala	Pan-STARRS 1	L5	6.8 km	MPC · JPL
747332	2012 TH_{353}	—	February 18, 2015	Mount Lemmon	Mount Lemmon Survey	·	2.9 km	MPC · JPL
747333	2012 TX_{354}	—	October 14, 2012	Kitt Peak	Spacewatch	·	1.8 km	MPC · JPL
747334	2012 TB_{356}	—	October 11, 2012	Haleakala	Pan-STARRS 1	·	770 m	MPC · JPL
747335	2012 TJ_{356}	—	October 8, 2012	Mount Lemmon	Mount Lemmon Survey	L5	7.2 km	MPC · JPL
747336	2012 TP_{359}	—	October 8, 2012	Mount Lemmon	Mount Lemmon Survey	·	1.5 km	MPC · JPL
747337	2012 TS_{359}	—	October 15, 2012	Oukaïmeden	C. Rinner	L5	6.4 km	MPC · JPL
747338	2012 TY_{359}	—	October 8, 2012	Haleakala	Pan-STARRS 1	·	1.1 km	MPC · JPL
747339	2012 TJ_{360}	—	October 7, 2012	Haleakala	Pan-STARRS 1	·	970 m	MPC · JPL
747340	2012 TB_{361}	—	October 7, 2012	Haleakala	Pan-STARRS 1	(5)	780 m	MPC · JPL
747341	2012 TH_{362}	—	October 11, 2012	Haleakala	Pan-STARRS 1	·	810 m	MPC · JPL
747342	2012 TX_{362}	—	October 10, 2012	Mount Lemmon	Mount Lemmon Survey	L5	6.8 km	MPC · JPL
747343	2012 TZ_{363}	—	October 11, 2012	Mount Lemmon	Mount Lemmon Survey	·	960 m	MPC · JPL
747344	2012 TL_{364}	—	October 8, 2012	Mount Lemmon	Mount Lemmon Survey	·	780 m	MPC · JPL
747345	2012 TX_{369}	—	October 11, 2012	Mount Lemmon	Mount Lemmon Survey	·	1.8 km	MPC · JPL
747346	2012 TS_{372}	—	October 15, 2012	Mount Lemmon	Mount Lemmon Survey	L5	7.7 km	MPC · JPL
747347	2012 TP_{374}	—	October 8, 2012	Mount Lemmon	Mount Lemmon Survey	·	1.9 km	MPC · JPL
747348	2012 TN_{387}	—	October 10, 2012	Mount Lemmon	Mount Lemmon Survey	·	1.1 km	MPC · JPL
747349	2012 UP	—	October 16, 2012	Mount Lemmon	Mount Lemmon Survey	L5	7.5 km	MPC · JPL
747350	2012 UO_{1}	—	September 15, 2012	Mount Lemmon	Mount Lemmon Survey	HNS	1.0 km	MPC · JPL
747351	2012 UU_{5}	—	October 6, 2012	Mount Lemmon	Mount Lemmon Survey	·	490 m	MPC · JPL
747352	2012 US_{6}	—	August 22, 2007	Kitt Peak	Spacewatch	·	1.3 km	MPC · JPL
747353	2012 UP_{16}	—	September 24, 2008	Kitt Peak	Spacewatch	·	820 m	MPC · JPL
747354	2012 UN_{17}	—	April 6, 2005	Mount Lemmon	Mount Lemmon Survey	TIR	2.6 km	MPC · JPL
747355	2012 UJ_{18}	—	September 14, 2012	Mount Lemmon	Mount Lemmon Survey	L5	8.5 km	MPC · JPL
747356	2012 UN_{20}	—	October 8, 2012	Kitt Peak	Spacewatch	HNS	1.2 km	MPC · JPL
747357	2012 UD_{26}	—	October 17, 2012	Mount Lemmon	Mount Lemmon Survey	·	2.9 km	MPC · JPL
747358	2012 UP_{29}	—	October 17, 2012	Piszkés-tető	K. Sárneczky, T. Vorobjov	·	2.5 km	MPC · JPL
747359	2012 UG_{30}	—	September 26, 2012	Nogales	M. Schwartz, P. R. Holvorcem	·	2.4 km	MPC · JPL
747360	2012 UO_{35}	—	October 8, 2012	Mount Lemmon	Mount Lemmon Survey	·	950 m	MPC · JPL
747361	2012 UP_{35}	—	October 3, 2008	Mount Lemmon	Mount Lemmon Survey	(5)	590 m	MPC · JPL
747362	2012 UE_{36}	—	September 22, 2008	Mount Lemmon	Mount Lemmon Survey	·	780 m	MPC · JPL
747363	2012 UM_{37}	—	October 16, 2012	Mount Lemmon	Mount Lemmon Survey	EOS	1.7 km	MPC · JPL
747364	2012 UT_{44}	—	October 18, 2012	Mount Lemmon	Mount Lemmon Survey	·	1.3 km	MPC · JPL
747365	2012 UU_{46}	—	August 28, 2012	Mount Lemmon	Mount Lemmon Survey	·	1.2 km	MPC · JPL
747366	2012 UQ_{54}	—	October 26, 2008	Kitt Peak	Spacewatch	MAR	590 m	MPC · JPL
747367	2012 UB_{56}	—	October 21, 2001	Socorro	LINEAR	·	3.3 km	MPC · JPL
747368	2012 UH_{58}	—	November 11, 2004	Kitt Peak	Deep Ecliptic Survey	·	590 m	MPC · JPL
747369	2012 UX_{58}	—	October 4, 2008	Mount Lemmon	Mount Lemmon Survey	(5)	1.1 km	MPC · JPL
747370	2012 UN_{59}	—	October 19, 2012	Haleakala	Pan-STARRS 1	·	1.1 km	MPC · JPL
747371	2012 UB_{60}	—	October 28, 2008	Kitt Peak	Spacewatch	·	910 m	MPC · JPL
747372	2012 UP_{62}	—	October 17, 2012	Mount Lemmon	Mount Lemmon Survey	VER	2.4 km	MPC · JPL
747373	2012 UQ_{68}	—	September 16, 2012	Tenerife	ESA OGS	H	650 m	MPC · JPL
747374	2012 UR_{70}	—	August 26, 2012	Haleakala	Pan-STARRS 1	·	1.8 km	MPC · JPL
747375	2012 UT_{70}	—	October 11, 2012	Haleakala	Pan-STARRS 1	(5)	660 m	MPC · JPL
747376	2012 UV_{74}	—	October 18, 2012	Haleakala	Pan-STARRS 1	(895)	2.9 km	MPC · JPL
747377	2012 UQ_{76}	—	September 27, 2008	Mount Lemmon	Mount Lemmon Survey	·	720 m	MPC · JPL
747378	2012 UE_{77}	—	August 26, 2012	Haleakala	Pan-STARRS 1	·	1.4 km	MPC · JPL
747379	2012 UD_{78}	—	October 10, 2012	Kitt Peak	Spacewatch	3:2 · SHU	3.7 km	MPC · JPL
747380	2012 UU_{79}	—	October 19, 2012	Haleakala	Pan-STARRS 1	(5)	760 m	MPC · JPL
747381	2012 UP_{82}	—	October 20, 2012	Kitt Peak	Spacewatch	EUN	670 m	MPC · JPL
747382	2012 US_{82}	—	November 11, 2007	Mount Lemmon	Mount Lemmon Survey	·	2.8 km	MPC · JPL
747383	2012 UT_{83}	—	October 20, 2012	Kitt Peak	Spacewatch	·	1.3 km	MPC · JPL
747384	2012 UG_{86}	—	October 14, 2012	Kitt Peak	Spacewatch	AEO	970 m	MPC · JPL
747385	2012 UR_{88}	—	September 26, 2003	Apache Point	SDSS	·	1.5 km	MPC · JPL
747386	2012 US_{90}	—	October 21, 2012	Piszkés-tető	K. Sárneczky, G. Hodosán	H	480 m	MPC · JPL
747387	2012 UE_{98}	—	October 18, 2012	Nogales	M. Schwartz, P. R. Holvorcem	BAR	1.4 km	MPC · JPL
747388	2012 UY_{98}	—	September 6, 2008	Mount Lemmon	Mount Lemmon Survey	MAS	700 m	MPC · JPL
747389	2012 US_{99}	—	December 2, 2005	Kitt Peak	Wasserman, L. H., Millis, R. L.	MAS	590 m	MPC · JPL
747390	2012 UB_{102}	—	October 18, 2012	Haleakala	Pan-STARRS 1	·	2.5 km	MPC · JPL
747391	2012 UD_{102}	—	October 20, 2008	Kitt Peak	Spacewatch	·	490 m	MPC · JPL
747392	2012 UX_{104}	—	December 4, 2008	Mount Lemmon	Mount Lemmon Survey	·	1.4 km	MPC · JPL
747393	2012 UX_{107}	—	October 19, 2012	Haleakala	Pan-STARRS 1	·	2.5 km	MPC · JPL
747394	2012 UK_{108}	—	October 8, 2012	Mount Lemmon	Mount Lemmon Survey	MAS	620 m	MPC · JPL
747395	2012 UN_{111}	—	October 21, 2012	Haleakala	Pan-STARRS 1	·	1.2 km	MPC · JPL
747396	2012 UA_{114}	—	September 23, 2012	Mount Lemmon	Mount Lemmon Survey	L5 · (17492)	7.7 km	MPC · JPL
747397	2012 UU_{120}	—	October 10, 2001	Palomar	NEAT	H	460 m	MPC · JPL
747398	2012 UG_{121}	—	October 22, 2012	Haleakala	Pan-STARRS 1	·	1.1 km	MPC · JPL
747399	2012 UG_{122}	—	October 22, 2012	Haleakala	Pan-STARRS 1	·	820 m	MPC · JPL
747400	2012 UW_{123}	—	October 22, 2012	Haleakala	Pan-STARRS 1	·	910 m	MPC · JPL

== 747401–747500 ==
back to top

Designation			Discovery			Properties		Ref
Permanent	Provisional	Named after	Date	Site	Discoverer(s)	Category	Diam.	Ref
747401	2012 UH_{124}	—	October 22, 2012	Haleakala	Pan-STARRS 1	·	990 m	MPC · JPL
747402	2012 UY_{127}	—	October 16, 2012	Westfield	R. Holmes	·	1.2 km	MPC · JPL
747403	2012 UY_{129}	—	October 19, 2012	Mount Lemmon	Mount Lemmon Survey	·	1.8 km	MPC · JPL
747404	2012 UL_{132}	—	March 12, 2010	Mount Lemmon	Mount Lemmon Survey	MAR	790 m	MPC · JPL
747405	2012 UQ_{132}	—	October 6, 2008	Mount Lemmon	Mount Lemmon Survey	·	870 m	MPC · JPL
747406	2012 UY_{137}	—	October 22, 2012	Haleakala	Pan-STARRS 1	·	990 m	MPC · JPL
747407	2012 UR_{140}	—	October 18, 2012	Haleakala	Pan-STARRS 1	·	1.4 km	MPC · JPL
747408	2012 UO_{141}	—	October 8, 2012	Haleakala	Pan-STARRS 1	·	730 m	MPC · JPL
747409	2012 UG_{146}	—	July 1, 2011	Kitt Peak	Spacewatch	·	2.7 km	MPC · JPL
747410	2012 UW_{147}	—	October 8, 2007	Catalina	CSS	H	430 m	MPC · JPL
747411	2012 UJ_{149}	—	October 17, 2006	Kitt Peak	Spacewatch	·	2.6 km	MPC · JPL
747412	2012 UY_{149}	—	October 21, 2012	Kitt Peak	Spacewatch	BRG	1.2 km	MPC · JPL
747413	2012 UD_{151}	—	October 21, 2012	Kitt Peak	Spacewatch	·	990 m	MPC · JPL
747414	2012 UK_{152}	—	October 21, 2012	Kitt Peak	Spacewatch	·	1.2 km	MPC · JPL
747415	2012 UD_{155}	—	November 18, 2008	Kitt Peak	Spacewatch	(5)	880 m	MPC · JPL
747416	2012 UB_{159}	—	September 23, 2008	Mount Lemmon	Mount Lemmon Survey	·	1.0 km	MPC · JPL
747417	2012 UU_{162}	—	September 25, 2008	Mount Lemmon	Mount Lemmon Survey	NYS	1.1 km	MPC · JPL
747418	2012 UW_{162}	—	October 22, 2012	Kitt Peak	Spacewatch	(5)	1.0 km	MPC · JPL
747419	2012 UL_{164}	—	October 23, 2012	Haleakala	Pan-STARRS 1	ADE	1.7 km	MPC · JPL
747420	2012 UH_{165}	—	October 10, 2012	Haleakala	Pan-STARRS 1	·	1.2 km	MPC · JPL
747421	2012 UX_{166}	—	October 18, 2012	Mount Lemmon	Mount Lemmon Survey	·	1.0 km	MPC · JPL
747422	2012 UM_{168}	—	August 20, 2003	Palomar	NEAT	MAR	1.2 km	MPC · JPL
747423	2012 UE_{171}	—	October 6, 2012	Haleakala	Pan-STARRS 1	·	680 m	MPC · JPL
747424	2012 UX_{174}	—	October 31, 2012	Haleakala	Pan-STARRS 1	·	1.8 km	MPC · JPL
747425	2012 UV_{178}	—	October 21, 2012	Haleakala	Pan-STARRS 1	·	2.3 km	MPC · JPL
747426	2012 UT_{179}	—	November 1, 2008	Mount Lemmon	Mount Lemmon Survey	·	1.3 km	MPC · JPL
747427	2012 UX_{182}	—	October 21, 2012	Haleakala	Pan-STARRS 1	·	1.0 km	MPC · JPL
747428	2012 UA_{183}	—	October 21, 2012	Haleakala	Pan-STARRS 1	(5)	940 m	MPC · JPL
747429	2012 UJ_{183}	—	October 22, 2012	Haleakala	Pan-STARRS 1	·	870 m	MPC · JPL
747430	2012 UM_{185}	—	January 28, 2014	Kitt Peak	Spacewatch	EOS	1.6 km	MPC · JPL
747431	2012 UX_{185}	—	October 19, 2012	Haleakala	Pan-STARRS 1	·	970 m	MPC · JPL
747432	2012 UB_{186}	—	October 17, 2012	Mount Lemmon	Mount Lemmon Survey	·	2.6 km	MPC · JPL
747433	2012 UV_{186}	—	October 21, 2012	Piszkés-tető	K. Sárneczky, G. Hodosán	·	880 m	MPC · JPL
747434	2012 UW_{186}	—	January 4, 2014	Haleakala	Pan-STARRS 1	EOS	1.6 km	MPC · JPL
747435	2012 UH_{187}	—	October 8, 2016	Mount Lemmon	Mount Lemmon Survey	(194)	1.4 km	MPC · JPL
747436	2012 UT_{187}	—	April 18, 2015	Mount Lemmon	Mount Lemmon Survey	·	950 m	MPC · JPL
747437	2012 US_{188}	—	March 5, 2014	Haleakala	Pan-STARRS 1	·	870 m	MPC · JPL
747438	2012 UB_{189}	—	October 18, 2012	Haleakala	Pan-STARRS 1	·	940 m	MPC · JPL
747439	2012 UN_{189}	—	October 17, 2012	Mount Lemmon	Mount Lemmon Survey	·	1.2 km	MPC · JPL
747440	2012 US_{189}	—	October 22, 2012	Haleakala	Pan-STARRS 1	EUN	950 m	MPC · JPL
747441	2012 UU_{189}	—	October 17, 2012	Mount Lemmon	Mount Lemmon Survey	·	2.5 km	MPC · JPL
747442	2012 UB_{190}	—	April 25, 2015	Haleakala	Pan-STARRS 1	EUN	930 m	MPC · JPL
747443	2012 UD_{190}	—	October 20, 2012	Haleakala	Pan-STARRS 1	·	900 m	MPC · JPL
747444	2012 UC_{191}	—	October 20, 2012	Mount Lemmon	Mount Lemmon Survey	·	570 m	MPC · JPL
747445	2012 UE_{191}	—	October 16, 2012	Mount Lemmon	Mount Lemmon Survey	·	1.9 km	MPC · JPL
747446	2012 UE_{192}	—	October 17, 2012	Mount Lemmon	Mount Lemmon Survey	·	1.0 km	MPC · JPL
747447	2012 UH_{193}	—	October 21, 2016	Mount Lemmon	Mount Lemmon Survey	(194)	910 m	MPC · JPL
747448	2012 UJ_{193}	—	October 20, 2012	Piszkés-tető	K. Sárneczky, A. Király	·	1.1 km	MPC · JPL
747449	2012 UU_{193}	—	October 18, 2012	Haleakala	Pan-STARRS 1	·	790 m	MPC · JPL
747450	2012 UM_{197}	—	October 20, 2012	Haleakala	Pan-STARRS 1	EUN	850 m	MPC · JPL
747451	2012 UO_{199}	—	October 18, 2012	Haleakala	Pan-STARRS 1	·	1.3 km	MPC · JPL
747452	2012 UD_{200}	—	March 5, 2014	Westfield	R. Holmes	·	1.8 km	MPC · JPL
747453	2012 UF_{200}	—	October 20, 2012	Piszkés-tető	K. Sárneczky, A. Király	L5	8.8 km	MPC · JPL
747454	2012 UG_{200}	—	December 30, 2013	Mount Lemmon	Mount Lemmon Survey	·	2.0 km	MPC · JPL
747455	2012 UX_{200}	—	October 25, 2016	Haleakala	Pan-STARRS 1	ADE	1.3 km	MPC · JPL
747456	2012 UC_{201}	—	October 23, 2012	Haleakala	Pan-STARRS 1	·	1.4 km	MPC · JPL
747457	2012 UG_{201}	—	October 18, 2012	Haleakala	Pan-STARRS 1	EOS	1.2 km	MPC · JPL
747458	2012 UH_{201}	—	October 22, 2012	Mount Lemmon	Mount Lemmon Survey	·	860 m	MPC · JPL
747459	2012 UN_{201}	—	October 26, 2012	Mount Lemmon	Mount Lemmon Survey	·	820 m	MPC · JPL
747460	2012 UW_{201}	—	October 25, 2012	Mount Lemmon	Mount Lemmon Survey	·	2.5 km	MPC · JPL
747461	2012 UB_{202}	—	February 12, 2018	Haleakala	Pan-STARRS 1	L5	7.2 km	MPC · JPL
747462	2012 UG_{202}	—	October 9, 2016	Haleakala	Pan-STARRS 1	·	1.2 km	MPC · JPL
747463	2012 UB_{206}	—	January 3, 2014	Kitt Peak	Spacewatch	·	1.2 km	MPC · JPL
747464	2012 UC_{206}	—	October 17, 2012	Mount Lemmon	Mount Lemmon Survey	·	1.3 km	MPC · JPL
747465	2012 UE_{206}	—	October 18, 2012	Haleakala	Pan-STARRS 1	·	1.1 km	MPC · JPL
747466	2012 US_{206}	—	October 19, 2012	Mount Lemmon	Mount Lemmon Survey	EOS	2.0 km	MPC · JPL
747467	2012 UG_{207}	—	October 16, 2012	Mount Lemmon	Mount Lemmon Survey	L5	7.5 km	MPC · JPL
747468	2012 UX_{207}	—	October 17, 2012	Haleakala	Pan-STARRS 1	L5	6.6 km	MPC · JPL
747469	2012 UT_{209}	—	May 21, 2015	Cerro Tololo	DECam	·	2.4 km	MPC · JPL
747470	2012 UB_{213}	—	October 23, 2012	Kitt Peak	Spacewatch	·	2.8 km	MPC · JPL
747471	2012 US_{213}	—	October 18, 2012	Haleakala	Pan-STARRS 1	V	540 m	MPC · JPL
747472	2012 UH_{214}	—	October 27, 2012	Mount Lemmon	Mount Lemmon Survey	·	950 m	MPC · JPL
747473	2012 UB_{215}	—	October 23, 2012	Kitt Peak	Spacewatch	EOS	1.6 km	MPC · JPL
747474	2012 UJ_{216}	—	October 20, 2012	Haleakala	Pan-STARRS 1	·	1.3 km	MPC · JPL
747475	2012 UU_{220}	—	October 17, 2012	Mount Lemmon	Mount Lemmon Survey	EUN	930 m	MPC · JPL
747476	2012 UW_{220}	—	October 21, 2012	Mount Lemmon	Mount Lemmon Survey	·	880 m	MPC · JPL
747477	2012 UQ_{227}	—	October 16, 2012	Mount Lemmon	Mount Lemmon Survey	·	1.9 km	MPC · JPL
747478	2012 UA_{228}	—	October 17, 2012	Haleakala	Pan-STARRS 1	·	2.3 km	MPC · JPL
747479	2012 UW_{230}	—	October 17, 2012	Haleakala	Pan-STARRS 1	EOS	1.4 km	MPC · JPL
747480	2012 UB_{233}	—	October 22, 2012	Mount Lemmon	Mount Lemmon Survey	·	2.0 km	MPC · JPL
747481	2012 UC_{233}	—	October 18, 2012	Mount Lemmon	Mount Lemmon Survey	·	2.4 km	MPC · JPL
747482	2012 UD_{247}	—	October 23, 2012	Mount Lemmon	Mount Lemmon Survey	·	2.3 km	MPC · JPL
747483	2012 UH_{250}	—	October 17, 2012	Haleakala	Pan-STARRS 1	L5	7.1 km	MPC · JPL
747484	2012 VF_{4}	—	November 3, 2012	Haleakala	Pan-STARRS 1	·	1.0 km	MPC · JPL
747485	2012 VR_{4}	—	November 2, 2012	Mount Lemmon	Mount Lemmon Survey	·	1.5 km	MPC · JPL
747486	2012 VN_{8}	—	November 3, 2012	Haleakala	Pan-STARRS 1	·	1.2 km	MPC · JPL
747487	2012 VO_{9}	—	March 22, 2001	Kitt Peak	SKADS	·	1.1 km	MPC · JPL
747488	2012 VK_{15}	—	November 4, 2012	Haleakala	Pan-STARRS 1	EUN	710 m	MPC · JPL
747489	2012 VE_{17}	—	November 20, 2008	Mount Lemmon	Mount Lemmon Survey	(5)	960 m	MPC · JPL
747490	2012 VQ_{17}	—	September 28, 2003	Kitt Peak	Spacewatch	·	1.3 km	MPC · JPL
747491	2012 VZ_{18}	—	November 7, 2008	Mount Lemmon	Mount Lemmon Survey	KON	1.8 km	MPC · JPL
747492	2012 VA_{21}	—	November 9, 2008	Kitt Peak	Spacewatch	·	700 m	MPC · JPL
747493	2012 VB_{22}	—	November 3, 2012	Mount Lemmon	Mount Lemmon Survey	·	2.5 km	MPC · JPL
747494	2012 VZ_{22}	—	October 19, 2012	Haleakala	Pan-STARRS 1	·	570 m	MPC · JPL
747495	2012 VM_{23}	—	November 4, 2012	Mount Lemmon	Mount Lemmon Survey	·	690 m	MPC · JPL
747496	2012 VL_{28}	—	October 8, 2012	Kitt Peak	Spacewatch	EOS	1.3 km	MPC · JPL
747497	2012 VJ_{29}	—	October 26, 2008	Kitt Peak	Spacewatch	·	830 m	MPC · JPL
747498	2012 VV_{29}	—	August 28, 2012	Mount Lemmon	Mount Lemmon Survey	HNS	1.1 km	MPC · JPL
747499	2012 VD_{36}	—	October 21, 2012	Haleakala	Pan-STARRS 1	·	3.7 km	MPC · JPL
747500	2012 VB_{38}	—	October 31, 2008	Catalina	CSS	·	1.3 km	MPC · JPL

== 747501–747600 ==
back to top

Designation			Discovery			Properties		Ref
Permanent	Provisional	Named after	Date	Site	Discoverer(s)	Category	Diam.	Ref
747501	2012 VE_{42}	—	October 17, 2012	Mount Lemmon	Mount Lemmon Survey	·	890 m	MPC · JPL
747502	2012 VJ_{43}	—	November 6, 2012	Mount Lemmon	Mount Lemmon Survey	EUN	960 m	MPC · JPL
747503	2012 VO_{45}	—	November 20, 2008	Kitt Peak	Spacewatch	·	640 m	MPC · JPL
747504	2012 VN_{49}	—	October 21, 2012	Kitt Peak	Spacewatch	·	500 m	MPC · JPL
747505	2012 VP_{49}	—	October 18, 2012	Haleakala	Pan-STARRS 1	·	980 m	MPC · JPL
747506	2012 VU_{53}	—	September 18, 2012	Mount Lemmon	Mount Lemmon Survey	·	1.7 km	MPC · JPL
747507	2012 VV_{62}	—	November 7, 2008	Mount Lemmon	Mount Lemmon Survey	·	900 m	MPC · JPL
747508	2012 VG_{64}	—	November 12, 2012	Mount Lemmon	Mount Lemmon Survey	KON	1.5 km	MPC · JPL
747509	2012 VM_{66}	—	September 26, 2012	Mount Lemmon	Mount Lemmon Survey	·	2.5 km	MPC · JPL
747510	2012 VP_{70}	—	October 21, 2012	Haleakala	Pan-STARRS 1	·	2.1 km	MPC · JPL
747511	2012 VC_{71}	—	October 21, 2012	Haleakala	Pan-STARRS 1	KON	1.5 km	MPC · JPL
747512	2012 VN_{79}	—	November 19, 2008	Mount Lemmon	Mount Lemmon Survey	·	870 m	MPC · JPL
747513	2012 VR_{82}	—	October 19, 2012	Haleakala	Pan-STARRS 1	·	1.8 km	MPC · JPL
747514	2012 VF_{83}	—	October 7, 2004	Kitt Peak	Spacewatch	·	1.1 km	MPC · JPL
747515	2012 VM_{86}	—	October 16, 2012	Kitt Peak	Spacewatch	(5)	930 m	MPC · JPL
747516	2012 VM_{91}	—	November 14, 2012	Kitt Peak	Spacewatch	KON	1.4 km	MPC · JPL
747517	2012 VN_{91}	—	November 14, 2012	Kitt Peak	Spacewatch	·	1.7 km	MPC · JPL
747518	2012 VE_{97}	—	November 8, 2012	Socorro	LINEAR	·	1.2 km	MPC · JPL
747519	2012 VK_{99}	—	October 21, 2012	Haleakala	Pan-STARRS 1	(5)	1.0 km	MPC · JPL
747520	2012 VL_{99}	—	October 21, 2012	Haleakala	Pan-STARRS 1	·	1.5 km	MPC · JPL
747521	2012 VR_{99}	—	November 7, 2012	Haleakala	Pan-STARRS 1	·	1.3 km	MPC · JPL
747522	2012 VN_{100}	—	November 13, 2006	Kitt Peak	Spacewatch	·	2.2 km	MPC · JPL
747523	2012 VV_{102}	—	May 25, 2006	Mauna Kea	P. A. Wiegert	·	1.2 km	MPC · JPL
747524	2012 VQ_{104}	—	October 18, 2012	Haleakala	Pan-STARRS 1	·	2.3 km	MPC · JPL
747525	2012 VO_{106}	—	October 22, 2012	Haleakala	Pan-STARRS 1	·	1.7 km	MPC · JPL
747526	2012 VC_{109}	—	October 29, 2008	Kitt Peak	Spacewatch	·	580 m	MPC · JPL
747527	2012 VF_{111}	—	November 7, 2012	Haleakala	Pan-STARRS 1	·	2.3 km	MPC · JPL
747528	2012 VH_{112}	—	October 9, 2012	Haleakala	Pan-STARRS 1	·	1.6 km	MPC · JPL
747529	2012 VR_{112}	—	October 10, 2012	Mount Lemmon	Mount Lemmon Survey	·	2.9 km	MPC · JPL
747530	2012 VG_{113}	—	October 18, 2012	Haleakala	Pan-STARRS 1	·	830 m	MPC · JPL
747531	2012 VK_{114}	—	November 14, 2012	Kitt Peak	Spacewatch	·	760 m	MPC · JPL
747532 Davidabrown	2012 VA_{115}	Davidabrown	November 14, 2012	Mount Graham	K. Černis, R. P. Boyle	·	1 km	MPC · JPL
747533	2012 VA_{117}	—	December 6, 2013	Haleakala	Pan-STARRS 1	·	3.0 km	MPC · JPL
747534	2012 VF_{117}	—	November 12, 2012	Mount Lemmon	Mount Lemmon Survey	·	880 m	MPC · JPL
747535	2012 VO_{117}	—	November 7, 2012	Mount Lemmon	Mount Lemmon Survey	(5)	1.1 km	MPC · JPL
747536	2012 VC_{118}	—	May 22, 2015	Haleakala	Pan-STARRS 1	·	1.0 km	MPC · JPL
747537	2012 VD_{118}	—	November 6, 2012	Kitt Peak	Spacewatch	·	800 m	MPC · JPL
747538	2012 VE_{118}	—	May 11, 2015	Mount Lemmon	Mount Lemmon Survey	·	2.2 km	MPC · JPL
747539	2012 VX_{118}	—	November 13, 2012	Mount Lemmon	Mount Lemmon Survey	·	700 m	MPC · JPL
747540	2012 VC_{119}	—	November 4, 2012	Mount Lemmon	Mount Lemmon Survey	·	1.7 km	MPC · JPL
747541	2012 VD_{119}	—	November 14, 2012	Kitt Peak	Spacewatch	(5)	740 m	MPC · JPL
747542	2012 VK_{119}	—	November 2, 2012	Haleakala	Pan-STARRS 1	·	1.1 km	MPC · JPL
747543	2012 VX_{119}	—	November 12, 2012	Haleakala	Pan-STARRS 1	·	3.5 km	MPC · JPL
747544	2012 VG_{120}	—	November 7, 2012	Mount Lemmon	Mount Lemmon Survey	·	940 m	MPC · JPL
747545	2012 VQ_{121}	—	June 23, 2018	Haleakala	Pan-STARRS 1	·	3.1 km	MPC · JPL
747546	2012 VG_{122}	—	November 27, 2013	Haleakala	Pan-STARRS 1	·	1.6 km	MPC · JPL
747547	2012 VV_{122}	—	September 2, 2016	Mount Lemmon	Mount Lemmon Survey	·	830 m	MPC · JPL
747548	2012 VJ_{123}	—	November 13, 2012	Kitt Peak	Spacewatch	·	3.0 km	MPC · JPL
747549	2012 VC_{124}	—	December 4, 2016	Mount Lemmon	Mount Lemmon Survey	PHO	1.1 km	MPC · JPL
747550	2012 VP_{124}	—	April 25, 2015	Haleakala	Pan-STARRS 1	·	1.0 km	MPC · JPL
747551	2012 VK_{125}	—	November 7, 2012	Kitt Peak	Spacewatch	·	770 m	MPC · JPL
747552	2012 VX_{125}	—	January 8, 2016	Haleakala	Pan-STARRS 1	·	3.0 km	MPC · JPL
747553	2012 VU_{127}	—	November 7, 2012	Haleakala	Pan-STARRS 1	·	2.1 km	MPC · JPL
747554	2012 VC_{128}	—	November 7, 2012	Haleakala	Pan-STARRS 1	VER	2.2 km	MPC · JPL
747555	2012 VV_{128}	—	November 2, 2012	Catalina	CSS	ADE	1.5 km	MPC · JPL
747556	2012 VA_{130}	—	November 7, 2012	Mount Lemmon	Mount Lemmon Survey	(5)	960 m	MPC · JPL
747557	2012 VO_{130}	—	November 12, 2012	Mount Lemmon	Mount Lemmon Survey	EUN	680 m	MPC · JPL
747558	2012 VG_{131}	—	November 5, 2012	Kitt Peak	Spacewatch	·	760 m	MPC · JPL
747559	2012 VH_{131}	—	September 17, 2003	Kitt Peak	Spacewatch	·	1.1 km	MPC · JPL
747560	2012 VA_{134}	—	November 12, 2012	Mount Lemmon	Mount Lemmon Survey	·	3.1 km	MPC · JPL
747561	2012 VE_{134}	—	November 12, 2012	Mount Lemmon	Mount Lemmon Survey	VER	2.2 km	MPC · JPL
747562	2012 VW_{135}	—	November 13, 2012	Mount Lemmon	Mount Lemmon Survey	·	1.1 km	MPC · JPL
747563	2012 WF_{4}	—	October 8, 2012	Haleakala	Pan-STARRS 1	·	850 m	MPC · JPL
747564	2012 WD_{5}	—	October 22, 2012	Kitt Peak	Spacewatch	·	1.5 km	MPC · JPL
747565	2012 WN_{6}	—	November 17, 2012	Kitt Peak	Spacewatch	(5)	890 m	MPC · JPL
747566	2012 WR_{8}	—	November 4, 2012	Kitt Peak	Spacewatch	·	1.8 km	MPC · JPL
747567	2012 WN_{10}	—	October 23, 2012	Mount Lemmon	Mount Lemmon Survey	·	1.2 km	MPC · JPL
747568	2012 WJ_{15}	—	November 19, 2012	Kitt Peak	Spacewatch	·	900 m	MPC · JPL
747569	2012 WR_{15}	—	November 19, 2012	Kitt Peak	Spacewatch	·	1.8 km	MPC · JPL
747570	2012 WW_{15}	—	November 14, 2012	Kitt Peak	Spacewatch	·	1.3 km	MPC · JPL
747571	2012 WJ_{16}	—	September 25, 2012	Mount Lemmon	Mount Lemmon Survey	(5)	870 m	MPC · JPL
747572	2012 WU_{18}	—	November 20, 2012	Mount Lemmon	Mount Lemmon Survey	·	1.2 km	MPC · JPL
747573	2012 WX_{19}	—	October 14, 2012	Kitt Peak	Spacewatch	(5)	960 m	MPC · JPL
747574	2012 WC_{21}	—	November 20, 2012	Mount Lemmon	Mount Lemmon Survey	·	2.1 km	MPC · JPL
747575	2012 WD_{21}	—	October 24, 1995	Kitt Peak	Spacewatch	·	1.0 km	MPC · JPL
747576	2012 WX_{22}	—	November 20, 2012	Mount Lemmon	Mount Lemmon Survey	·	840 m	MPC · JPL
747577	2012 WR_{24}	—	December 30, 2008	Mount Lemmon	Mount Lemmon Survey	(5)	1.1 km	MPC · JPL
747578	2012 WW_{24}	—	September 19, 2012	Kitt Peak	Spacewatch	·	1.4 km	MPC · JPL
747579	2012 WR_{26}	—	November 4, 2012	Kitt Peak	Spacewatch	·	720 m	MPC · JPL
747580	2012 WE_{29}	—	November 22, 2012	Kitt Peak	Spacewatch	·	970 m	MPC · JPL
747581	2012 WH_{30}	—	September 24, 2008	Kitt Peak	Spacewatch	MAS	510 m	MPC · JPL
747582	2012 WW_{35}	—	October 13, 2012	Nogales	M. Schwartz, P. R. Holvorcem	·	1.5 km	MPC · JPL
747583	2012 WL_{37}	—	November 22, 2012	Kitt Peak	Spacewatch	·	1.8 km	MPC · JPL
747584	2012 WU_{37}	—	November 26, 2012	Mount Lemmon	Mount Lemmon Survey	·	1.0 km	MPC · JPL
747585	2012 WZ_{38}	—	December 13, 2017	Haleakala	Pan-STARRS 1	MAR	700 m	MPC · JPL
747586	2012 WV_{39}	—	January 14, 2018	Haleakala	Pan-STARRS 1	·	980 m	MPC · JPL
747587	2012 WW_{39}	—	May 21, 2015	Haleakala	Pan-STARRS 1	·	1.2 km	MPC · JPL
747588	2012 WY_{39}	—	November 27, 2012	Mount Lemmon	Mount Lemmon Survey	·	1.3 km	MPC · JPL
747589	2012 WE_{40}	—	November 22, 2012	Kitt Peak	Spacewatch	(5)	910 m	MPC · JPL
747590	2012 WD_{41}	—	November 26, 2012	Mount Lemmon	Mount Lemmon Survey	·	1.1 km	MPC · JPL
747591	2012 WL_{41}	—	November 23, 2012	Kitt Peak	Spacewatch	(5)	930 m	MPC · JPL
747592	2012 WX_{41}	—	November 25, 2012	Kitt Peak	Spacewatch	·	1.2 km	MPC · JPL
747593	2012 WZ_{44}	—	November 25, 2012	Kitt Peak	Spacewatch	(5)	900 m	MPC · JPL
747594	2012 XC_{3}	—	December 3, 2012	Mount Lemmon	Mount Lemmon Survey	·	2.2 km	MPC · JPL
747595	2012 XD_{4}	—	December 3, 2012	Mount Lemmon	Mount Lemmon Survey	·	1.4 km	MPC · JPL
747596	2012 XF_{4}	—	November 20, 2008	Kitt Peak	Spacewatch	·	870 m	MPC · JPL
747597	2012 XJ_{5}	—	September 24, 2008	Mount Lemmon	Mount Lemmon Survey	·	1.0 km	MPC · JPL
747598	2012 XM_{6}	—	November 7, 2012	Mount Lemmon	Mount Lemmon Survey	·	830 m	MPC · JPL
747599	2012 XQ_{11}	—	November 10, 2004	Kitt Peak	Deep Ecliptic Survey	·	730 m	MPC · JPL
747600	2012 XB_{14}	—	December 5, 2012	Mount Lemmon	Mount Lemmon Survey	PHO	960 m	MPC · JPL

== 747601–747700 ==
back to top

Designation			Discovery			Properties		Ref
Permanent	Provisional	Named after	Date	Site	Discoverer(s)	Category	Diam.	Ref
747601	2012 XR_{17}	—	November 17, 2012	Kitt Peak	Spacewatch	(5)	800 m	MPC · JPL
747602	2012 XX_{20}	—	November 6, 2012	Kitt Peak	Spacewatch	·	980 m	MPC · JPL
747603	2012 XT_{24}	—	December 3, 2012	Mount Lemmon	Mount Lemmon Survey	·	1.0 km	MPC · JPL
747604	2012 XL_{26}	—	November 6, 2012	Mount Lemmon	Mount Lemmon Survey	·	1.2 km	MPC · JPL
747605	2012 XF_{28}	—	November 7, 2012	Mount Lemmon	Mount Lemmon Survey	·	1.3 km	MPC · JPL
747606	2012 XK_{30}	—	November 18, 2008	Kitt Peak	Spacewatch	·	820 m	MPC · JPL
747607	2012 XF_{31}	—	November 7, 2012	Kitt Peak	Spacewatch	·	2.5 km	MPC · JPL
747608	2012 XX_{31}	—	September 14, 2007	Mount Lemmon	Mount Lemmon Survey	·	1.5 km	MPC · JPL
747609	2012 XL_{33}	—	December 3, 2012	Mount Lemmon	Mount Lemmon Survey	·	930 m	MPC · JPL
747610	2012 XY_{34}	—	December 3, 2012	Mount Lemmon	Mount Lemmon Survey	·	690 m	MPC · JPL
747611	2012 XX_{35}	—	December 3, 2012	Mount Lemmon	Mount Lemmon Survey	·	1.2 km	MPC · JPL
747612	2012 XY_{38}	—	August 18, 2012	Tenerife	ESA OGS	·	1.3 km	MPC · JPL
747613	2012 XW_{42}	—	December 3, 2012	Mount Lemmon	Mount Lemmon Survey	·	1.0 km	MPC · JPL
747614	2012 XA_{45}	—	December 1, 2008	Kitt Peak	Spacewatch	·	810 m	MPC · JPL
747615	2012 XZ_{47}	—	August 2, 2011	Haleakala	Pan-STARRS 1	·	1.5 km	MPC · JPL
747616	2012 XA_{48}	—	October 29, 2008	Kitt Peak	Spacewatch	·	1.4 km	MPC · JPL
747617	2012 XC_{52}	—	December 6, 2012	Mount Lemmon	Mount Lemmon Survey	(5)	790 m	MPC · JPL
747618	2012 XS_{52}	—	December 30, 2008	Mount Lemmon	Mount Lemmon Survey	KON	2.2 km	MPC · JPL
747619	2012 XK_{53}	—	November 20, 2012	Mount Lemmon	Mount Lemmon Survey	·	1.1 km	MPC · JPL
747620	2012 XG_{54}	—	December 31, 2008	Kitt Peak	Spacewatch	·	1.0 km	MPC · JPL
747621	2012 XV_{54}	—	December 9, 2012	Haleakala	Pan-STARRS 1	·	700 m	MPC · JPL
747622	2012 XC_{57}	—	November 19, 2012	Kitt Peak	Spacewatch	·	990 m	MPC · JPL
747623	2012 XG_{57}	—	May 5, 2010	Mount Lemmon	Mount Lemmon Survey	·	2.2 km	MPC · JPL
747624	2012 XC_{60}	—	October 13, 2012	Kitt Peak	Spacewatch	·	2.3 km	MPC · JPL
747625	2012 XK_{63}	—	September 3, 2008	Kitt Peak	Spacewatch	·	1.1 km	MPC · JPL
747626	2012 XA_{64}	—	October 17, 2012	Mount Lemmon	Mount Lemmon Survey	·	890 m	MPC · JPL
747627	2012 XB_{64}	—	December 4, 2012	Mount Lemmon	Mount Lemmon Survey	·	2.6 km	MPC · JPL
747628	2012 XG_{67}	—	November 6, 1999	Kitt Peak	Spacewatch	EUN	850 m	MPC · JPL
747629	2012 XW_{67}	—	November 20, 2012	Nogales	M. Schwartz, P. R. Holvorcem	·	1.3 km	MPC · JPL
747630	2012 XU_{72}	—	December 6, 2012	Mount Lemmon	Mount Lemmon Survey	·	1.8 km	MPC · JPL
747631	2012 XY_{72}	—	September 21, 1995	Kitt Peak	Spacewatch	(5)	810 m	MPC · JPL
747632	2012 XC_{73}	—	December 5, 2008	Kitt Peak	Spacewatch	MAR	790 m	MPC · JPL
747633	2012 XT_{73}	—	November 30, 2008	Kitt Peak	Spacewatch	·	840 m	MPC · JPL
747634	2012 XX_{75}	—	April 22, 2009	Mount Lemmon	Mount Lemmon Survey	·	2.6 km	MPC · JPL
747635	2012 XW_{76}	—	December 6, 2012	Mount Lemmon	Mount Lemmon Survey	·	1.1 km	MPC · JPL
747636	2012 XF_{77}	—	October 9, 2012	Mount Lemmon	Mount Lemmon Survey	·	890 m	MPC · JPL
747637	2012 XD_{80}	—	November 7, 2012	Haleakala	Pan-STARRS 1	·	2.2 km	MPC · JPL
747638	2012 XS_{80}	—	December 6, 2012	Mount Lemmon	Mount Lemmon Survey	EUN	750 m	MPC · JPL
747639	2012 XF_{81}	—	November 7, 2012	Mount Lemmon	Mount Lemmon Survey	·	1.2 km	MPC · JPL
747640	2012 XB_{86}	—	November 13, 2012	Mount Lemmon	Mount Lemmon Survey	(5)	940 m	MPC · JPL
747641	2012 XU_{88}	—	December 8, 2012	Mount Lemmon	Mount Lemmon Survey	·	2.3 km	MPC · JPL
747642	2012 XR_{92}	—	December 8, 2012	Mount Lemmon	Mount Lemmon Survey	MAR	750 m	MPC · JPL
747643	2012 XO_{95}	—	December 4, 2012	Mount Lemmon	Mount Lemmon Survey	·	2.9 km	MPC · JPL
747644	2012 XA_{97}	—	November 16, 2012	Les Engarouines	L. Bernasconi	(5)	1.3 km	MPC · JPL
747645	2012 XE_{97}	—	December 5, 2012	Mount Lemmon	Mount Lemmon Survey	·	1.2 km	MPC · JPL
747646	2012 XG_{99}	—	December 5, 2012	Mount Lemmon	Mount Lemmon Survey	(5)	910 m	MPC · JPL
747647	2012 XT_{101}	—	December 5, 2012	Mount Lemmon	Mount Lemmon Survey	·	1.0 km	MPC · JPL
747648	2012 XS_{102}	—	December 5, 2012	Mount Lemmon	Mount Lemmon Survey	·	2.5 km	MPC · JPL
747649	2012 XC_{103}	—	November 25, 2012	Kitt Peak	Spacewatch	·	1.4 km	MPC · JPL
747650	2012 XF_{104}	—	December 29, 2008	Kitt Peak	Spacewatch	·	1.5 km	MPC · JPL
747651	2012 XK_{106}	—	December 7, 2012	Mount Lemmon	Mount Lemmon Survey	·	1.0 km	MPC · JPL
747652	2012 XY_{106}	—	September 19, 2003	Palomar	NEAT	·	1.5 km	MPC · JPL
747653	2012 XK_{107}	—	December 8, 2012	Catalina	CSS	(5)	820 m	MPC · JPL
747654	2012 XM_{107}	—	November 6, 2012	Kitt Peak	Spacewatch	·	1.0 km	MPC · JPL
747655	2012 XG_{115}	—	November 7, 2012	Haleakala	Pan-STARRS 1	PHO	740 m	MPC · JPL
747656	2012 XD_{116}	—	December 7, 2012	Haleakala	Pan-STARRS 1	·	2.9 km	MPC · JPL
747657	2012 XA_{117}	—	December 8, 2012	Mayhill-ISON	L. Elenin	EUN	1.0 km	MPC · JPL
747658	2012 XX_{125}	—	June 23, 1995	Kitt Peak	Spacewatch	·	1.1 km	MPC · JPL
747659	2012 XY_{129}	—	May 8, 2011	Mayhill-ISON	L. Elenin	·	930 m	MPC · JPL
747660	2012 XX_{130}	—	December 21, 2008	Catalina	CSS	·	860 m	MPC · JPL
747661	2012 XD_{131}	—	December 11, 2012	Mount Lemmon	Mount Lemmon Survey	·	1.3 km	MPC · JPL
747662	2012 XY_{132}	—	April 30, 2009	Mount Lemmon	Mount Lemmon Survey	BAR	1.0 km	MPC · JPL
747663	2012 XH_{137}	—	November 26, 2012	Mount Lemmon	Mount Lemmon Survey	·	3.5 km	MPC · JPL
747664	2012 XX_{142}	—	December 7, 2012	Haleakala	Pan-STARRS 1	·	1.0 km	MPC · JPL
747665	2012 XQ_{145}	—	November 23, 2012	Kitt Peak	Spacewatch	·	1.1 km	MPC · JPL
747666	2012 XY_{145}	—	November 5, 2012	Kitt Peak	Spacewatch	·	900 m	MPC · JPL
747667	2012 XD_{146}	—	December 9, 2012	Piszkéstető	K. Sárneczky	·	1.4 km	MPC · JPL
747668	2012 XQ_{146}	—	November 25, 2012	Kitt Peak	Spacewatch	·	1.1 km	MPC · JPL
747669	2012 XG_{148}	—	December 4, 2012	Mount Lemmon	Mount Lemmon Survey	·	540 m	MPC · JPL
747670	2012 XP_{148}	—	November 14, 2012	Kitt Peak	Spacewatch	·	950 m	MPC · JPL
747671	2012 XC_{151}	—	December 10, 2012	Kitt Peak	Spacewatch	JUN	1.1 km	MPC · JPL
747672	2012 XP_{151}	—	December 10, 2012	Kitt Peak	Spacewatch	·	1.7 km	MPC · JPL
747673	2012 XT_{152}	—	November 20, 2008	Mount Lemmon	Mount Lemmon Survey	·	1.0 km	MPC · JPL
747674	2012 XO_{159}	—	December 12, 2012	Mount Lemmon	Mount Lemmon Survey	EUN	870 m	MPC · JPL
747675	2012 XM_{160}	—	December 3, 2012	Mount Lemmon	Mount Lemmon Survey	·	1.3 km	MPC · JPL
747676	2012 XN_{160}	—	September 22, 2017	Haleakala	Pan-STARRS 1	·	2.7 km	MPC · JPL
747677	2012 XQ_{160}	—	December 10, 2012	Haleakala	Pan-STARRS 1	·	1.7 km	MPC · JPL
747678	2012 XS_{160}	—	December 11, 2012	Mount Lemmon	Mount Lemmon Survey	·	1.6 km	MPC · JPL
747679	2012 XV_{161}	—	December 4, 2012	Mount Lemmon	Mount Lemmon Survey	·	1.2 km	MPC · JPL
747680	2012 XB_{162}	—	December 8, 2012	Catalina	CSS	·	880 m	MPC · JPL
747681	2012 XD_{162}	—	December 9, 2012	Haleakala	Pan-STARRS 1	·	1.4 km	MPC · JPL
747682	2012 XQ_{162}	—	December 7, 2012	Kitt Peak	Spacewatch	·	1.2 km	MPC · JPL
747683	2012 XR_{163}	—	February 1, 2014	Tenerife	ESA OGS	EUN	1.1 km	MPC · JPL
747684	2012 XV_{164}	—	December 12, 2012	Nogales	M. Schwartz, P. R. Holvorcem	·	1.1 km	MPC · JPL
747685	2012 XW_{165}	—	November 12, 2015	Mount Lemmon	Mount Lemmon Survey	·	530 m	MPC · JPL
747686	2012 XY_{166}	—	December 8, 2012	Mount Lemmon	Mount Lemmon Survey	·	2.7 km	MPC · JPL
747687	2012 XZ_{166}	—	December 6, 2012	Kitt Peak	Spacewatch	L4	10 km	MPC · JPL
747688	2012 XZ_{167}	—	December 11, 2012	Mount Lemmon	Mount Lemmon Survey	·	890 m	MPC · JPL
747689	2012 XX_{168}	—	December 8, 2012	Nogales	M. Schwartz, P. R. Holvorcem	·	990 m	MPC · JPL
747690	2012 XJ_{169}	—	December 6, 2012	Mount Lemmon	Mount Lemmon Survey	·	730 m	MPC · JPL
747691	2012 XL_{169}	—	December 8, 2012	Mount Lemmon	Mount Lemmon Survey	·	3.3 km	MPC · JPL
747692	2012 XY_{170}	—	December 2, 2012	Mount Lemmon	Mount Lemmon Survey	·	1.0 km	MPC · JPL
747693	2012 XH_{171}	—	December 3, 2012	Mount Lemmon	Mount Lemmon Survey	·	1.1 km	MPC · JPL
747694	2012 XP_{171}	—	December 9, 2012	Mount Lemmon	Mount Lemmon Survey	·	930 m	MPC · JPL
747695	2012 XU_{171}	—	December 4, 2012	Mount Lemmon	Mount Lemmon Survey	·	2.0 km	MPC · JPL
747696	2012 XJ_{172}	—	December 5, 2012	Mount Lemmon	Mount Lemmon Survey	·	1.0 km	MPC · JPL
747697	2012 XN_{172}	—	December 13, 2012	Mount Lemmon	Mount Lemmon Survey	·	1.1 km	MPC · JPL
747698	2012 XP_{172}	—	December 8, 2012	Mount Lemmon	Mount Lemmon Survey	·	1.6 km	MPC · JPL
747699	2012 XW_{172}	—	December 13, 2012	Mount Lemmon	Mount Lemmon Survey	·	980 m	MPC · JPL
747700	2012 YA_{1}	—	December 18, 2012	Calar Alto-CASADO	Mottola, S.	EUN	1.1 km	MPC · JPL

== 747701–747800 ==
back to top

Designation			Discovery			Properties		Ref
Permanent	Provisional	Named after	Date	Site	Discoverer(s)	Category	Diam.	Ref
747701	2012 YJ_{6}	—	December 19, 2012	Calar Alto-CASADO	Mottola, S.	·	1.3 km	MPC · JPL
747702	2012 YK_{6}	—	January 25, 2009	Kitt Peak	Spacewatch	·	1.3 km	MPC · JPL
747703	2012 YM_{6}	—	December 21, 2012	Calar Alto-CASADO	Mottola, S.	(5)	980 m	MPC · JPL
747704	2012 YU_{6}	—	December 13, 2015	Haleakala	Pan-STARRS 1	H	590 m	MPC · JPL
747705	2012 YN_{10}	—	October 21, 2003	Kitt Peak	Spacewatch	·	1.3 km	MPC · JPL
747706	2012 YR_{10}	—	February 13, 2004	Kitt Peak	Spacewatch	·	1.6 km	MPC · JPL
747707	2012 YC_{11}	—	December 22, 2008	Kitt Peak	Spacewatch	·	990 m	MPC · JPL
747708	2012 YK_{12}	—	March 11, 2014	Mount Lemmon	Mount Lemmon Survey	MAR	1.1 km	MPC · JPL
747709	2012 YP_{12}	—	December 16, 2012	Tenerife	ESA OGS	·	1.2 km	MPC · JPL
747710	2012 YY_{12}	—	August 14, 2016	Haleakala	Pan-STARRS 1	·	1.6 km	MPC · JPL
747711	2012 YA_{13}	—	September 12, 2016	Haleakala	Pan-STARRS 1	·	1.2 km	MPC · JPL
747712	2012 YE_{13}	—	March 12, 2014	Mount Lemmon	Mount Lemmon Survey	·	1.5 km	MPC · JPL
747713	2012 YC_{16}	—	December 22, 2012	Haleakala	Pan-STARRS 1	L4	7.2 km	MPC · JPL
747714	2012 YF_{19}	—	December 23, 2012	Haleakala	Pan-STARRS 1	(5)	880 m	MPC · JPL
747715	2012 YH_{19}	—	September 30, 1999	Kitt Peak	Spacewatch	·	670 m	MPC · JPL
747716	2012 YX_{19}	—	December 20, 2012	Nogales	M. Schwartz, P. R. Holvorcem	·	1.6 km	MPC · JPL
747717	2012 YJ_{20}	—	December 22, 2012	Haleakala	Pan-STARRS 1	·	1.2 km	MPC · JPL
747718	2012 YR_{20}	—	December 22, 2012	Haleakala	Pan-STARRS 1	·	1.3 km	MPC · JPL
747719	2012 YV_{20}	—	December 22, 2012	Haleakala	Pan-STARRS 1	L4	7.2 km	MPC · JPL
747720	2012 YQ_{24}	—	December 22, 2012	Haleakala	Pan-STARRS 1	·	2.2 km	MPC · JPL
747721	2013 AT_{4}	—	September 25, 2011	Haleakala	Pan-STARRS 1	·	2.6 km	MPC · JPL
747722	2013 AR_{10}	—	July 7, 2010	Mount Lemmon	Mount Lemmon Survey	·	1.7 km	MPC · JPL
747723	2013 AG_{11}	—	January 4, 2013	Kitt Peak	Spacewatch	EUN	1.2 km	MPC · JPL
747724	2013 AO_{12}	—	January 3, 2013	Mount Lemmon	Mount Lemmon Survey	·	1.8 km	MPC · JPL
747725	2013 AN_{14}	—	February 14, 2009	Mount Lemmon	Mount Lemmon Survey	·	770 m	MPC · JPL
747726	2013 AF_{19}	—	October 23, 2003	Apache Point	SDSS	·	1.1 km	MPC · JPL
747727	2013 AE_{22}	—	May 23, 2006	Kitt Peak	Spacewatch	·	1.2 km	MPC · JPL
747728	2013 AH_{24}	—	November 23, 2012	Nogales	M. Schwartz, P. R. Holvorcem	(5) · fast	960 m	MPC · JPL
747729	2013 AM_{25}	—	December 8, 2012	Mount Lemmon	Mount Lemmon Survey	·	2.5 km	MPC · JPL
747730	2013 AG_{27}	—	January 2, 2013	Mount Lemmon	Mount Lemmon Survey	·	1.0 km	MPC · JPL
747731	2013 AD_{28}	—	January 4, 2013	Mount Lemmon	Mount Lemmon Survey	·	1.5 km	MPC · JPL
747732	2013 AF_{28}	—	December 21, 2003	Socorro	LINEAR	ADE	2.1 km	MPC · JPL
747733	2013 AR_{30}	—	December 12, 2012	Mount Lemmon	Mount Lemmon Survey	·	2.4 km	MPC · JPL
747734	2013 AU_{30}	—	January 3, 2013	Mount Lemmon	Mount Lemmon Survey	·	1.0 km	MPC · JPL
747735	2013 AA_{31}	—	December 9, 2012	Haleakala	Pan-STARRS 1	KON	1.8 km	MPC · JPL
747736	2013 AM_{31}	—	December 6, 2012	Kitt Peak	Spacewatch	(5)	960 m	MPC · JPL
747737	2013 AE_{32}	—	December 17, 2012	Tenerife	ESA OGS	·	1.3 km	MPC · JPL
747738	2013 AT_{32}	—	January 3, 2013	Mount Lemmon	Mount Lemmon Survey	·	1.6 km	MPC · JPL
747739	2013 AA_{33}	—	December 13, 2012	Piszkéstető	K. Sárneczky	·	1.4 km	MPC · JPL
747740	2013 AM_{34}	—	January 4, 2013	Mount Lemmon	Mount Lemmon Survey	·	1.7 km	MPC · JPL
747741	2013 AQ_{37}	—	September 20, 2003	Kitt Peak	Spacewatch	·	820 m	MPC · JPL
747742	2013 AX_{38}	—	January 25, 2009	Kitt Peak	Spacewatch	·	1.2 km	MPC · JPL
747743	2013 AX_{43}	—	November 20, 2003	Kitt Peak	Deep Ecliptic Survey	·	790 m	MPC · JPL
747744	2013 AQ_{45}	—	January 5, 2013	Kitt Peak	Spacewatch	(5)	970 m	MPC · JPL
747745	2013 AO_{46}	—	January 6, 2013	Kitt Peak	Spacewatch	·	1.6 km	MPC · JPL
747746	2013 AO_{48}	—	January 7, 2013	Mount Lemmon	Mount Lemmon Survey	·	2.8 km	MPC · JPL
747747	2013 AE_{49}	—	August 10, 2007	Kitt Peak	Spacewatch	·	1.3 km	MPC · JPL
747748	2013 AG_{49}	—	January 7, 2013	Piszkéstető	K. Sárneczky	·	1.5 km	MPC · JPL
747749	2013 AS_{50}	—	January 8, 2013	Haleakala	Pan-STARRS 1	H	510 m	MPC · JPL
747750	2013 AD_{59}	—	January 6, 2013	Kitt Peak	Spacewatch	JUN	740 m	MPC · JPL
747751	2013 AA_{61}	—	November 13, 2012	Mount Lemmon	Mount Lemmon Survey	·	880 m	MPC · JPL
747752	2013 AO_{61}	—	September 20, 2007	Kitt Peak	Spacewatch	·	1.0 km	MPC · JPL
747753	2013 AA_{63}	—	December 16, 2012	Tenerife	ESA OGS	HNS	1.0 km	MPC · JPL
747754	2013 AY_{64}	—	January 11, 2013	Haleakala	Pan-STARRS 1	H	420 m	MPC · JPL
747755	2013 AG_{68}	—	January 10, 2013	Kitt Peak	Spacewatch	·	890 m	MPC · JPL
747756	2013 AJ_{69}	—	January 6, 2013	Kitt Peak	Spacewatch	·	1.4 km	MPC · JPL
747757	2013 AA_{71}	—	February 22, 2009	Mount Lemmon	Mount Lemmon Survey	·	730 m	MPC · JPL
747758	2013 AB_{71}	—	January 10, 2013	Haleakala	Pan-STARRS 1	·	770 m	MPC · JPL
747759	2013 AU_{71}	—	December 13, 2012	Mount Lemmon	Mount Lemmon Survey	·	1.1 km	MPC · JPL
747760	2013 AJ_{72}	—	December 22, 2012	Haleakala	Pan-STARRS 1	EUN	1.1 km	MPC · JPL
747761	2013 AW_{73}	—	February 19, 2009	La Sagra	OAM	EUN	1.2 km	MPC · JPL
747762	2013 AC_{74}	—	January 9, 2013	Kitt Peak	Spacewatch	·	1.1 km	MPC · JPL
747763	2013 AG_{77}	—	February 4, 2009	Catalina	CSS	·	1.2 km	MPC · JPL
747764	2013 AA_{83}	—	January 12, 2013	Mount Lemmon	Mount Lemmon Survey	·	1.5 km	MPC · JPL
747765	2013 AQ_{83}	—	December 12, 2012	Mount Lemmon	Mount Lemmon Survey	L4	10 km	MPC · JPL
747766	2013 AD_{86}	—	December 23, 2012	Haleakala	Pan-STARRS 1	AST	1.2 km	MPC · JPL
747767	2013 AV_{89}	—	October 21, 1995	Kitt Peak	Spacewatch	(5)	960 m	MPC · JPL
747768	2013 AV_{90}	—	January 15, 2013	Catalina	CSS	·	1.2 km	MPC · JPL
747769	2013 AA_{94}	—	May 10, 2005	Kitt Peak	Spacewatch	JUN	1.1 km	MPC · JPL
747770	2013 AC_{100}	—	January 15, 2009	Kitt Peak	Spacewatch	·	1.0 km	MPC · JPL
747771	2013 AN_{104}	—	January 18, 2009	Kitt Peak	Spacewatch	·	770 m	MPC · JPL
747772	2013 AA_{106}	—	January 10, 2013	Haleakala	Pan-STARRS 1	VER	2.0 km	MPC · JPL
747773	2013 AP_{106}	—	January 4, 2013	Kitt Peak	Spacewatch	·	1.2 km	MPC · JPL
747774	2013 AW_{106}	—	January 10, 2013	Haleakala	Pan-STARRS 1	·	930 m	MPC · JPL
747775	2013 AM_{108}	—	December 9, 2012	Mount Lemmon	Mount Lemmon Survey	EUN	1.2 km	MPC · JPL
747776	2013 AL_{109}	—	January 10, 2013	Haleakala	Pan-STARRS 1	·	1.4 km	MPC · JPL
747777	2013 AS_{109}	—	January 5, 2013	Mount Lemmon	Mount Lemmon Survey	·	510 m	MPC · JPL
747778	2013 AR_{110}	—	October 19, 2003	Kitt Peak	Spacewatch	·	1.1 km	MPC · JPL
747779	2013 AE_{116}	—	September 27, 2012	Haleakala	Pan-STARRS 1	·	1.8 km	MPC · JPL
747780	2013 AU_{117}	—	January 15, 2013	Tenerife	ESA OGS	·	930 m	MPC · JPL
747781	2013 AT_{118}	—	January 4, 2013	Kitt Peak	Spacewatch	·	1.2 km	MPC · JPL
747782	2013 AV_{118}	—	January 15, 2013	Catalina	CSS	·	1.8 km	MPC · JPL
747783	2013 AA_{119}	—	January 3, 2013	Haleakala	Pan-STARRS 1	·	1.3 km	MPC · JPL
747784	2013 AQ_{122}	—	December 9, 2012	Mount Lemmon	Mount Lemmon Survey	·	1.4 km	MPC · JPL
747785	2013 AR_{124}	—	January 14, 2013	Mount Lemmon	Mount Lemmon Survey	·	1.2 km	MPC · JPL
747786	2013 AU_{124}	—	October 22, 2003	Kitt Peak	Spacewatch	·	1.5 km	MPC · JPL
747787	2013 AA_{129}	—	September 30, 2003	Kitt Peak	Spacewatch	·	1.2 km	MPC · JPL
747788	2013 AH_{131}	—	January 3, 2013	Haleakala	Pan-STARRS 1	L4	8.7 km	MPC · JPL
747789	2013 AA_{132}	—	January 9, 2013	Mount Lemmon	Mount Lemmon Survey	JUN	1.0 km	MPC · JPL
747790	2013 AB_{134}	—	November 25, 2006	Kitt Peak	Spacewatch	·	2.1 km	MPC · JPL
747791	2013 AO_{134}	—	February 3, 2009	Mount Lemmon	Mount Lemmon Survey	·	1.5 km	MPC · JPL
747792	2013 AK_{135}	—	January 10, 2013	Haleakala	Pan-STARRS 1	·	2.3 km	MPC · JPL
747793	2013 AY_{136}	—	January 10, 2013	Haleakala	Pan-STARRS 1	·	1.2 km	MPC · JPL
747794	2013 AN_{137}	—	January 9, 2013	Kitt Peak	Spacewatch	·	1.4 km	MPC · JPL
747795	2013 AV_{147}	—	January 4, 2013	Cerro Tololo	DECam	·	1.0 km	MPC · JPL
747796	2013 AQ_{151}	—	January 18, 2009	Kitt Peak	Spacewatch	·	1.0 km	MPC · JPL
747797	2013 AJ_{156}	—	January 4, 2013	Cerro Tololo	DECam	EUN	930 m	MPC · JPL
747798	2013 AK_{156}	—	February 27, 2008	Mount Lemmon	Mount Lemmon Survey	·	2.3 km	MPC · JPL
747799	2013 AA_{157}	—	January 20, 2013	Mount Lemmon	Mount Lemmon Survey	·	1.1 km	MPC · JPL
747800	2013 AW_{157}	—	September 29, 2011	Mount Lemmon	Mount Lemmon Survey	·	1.2 km	MPC · JPL

== 747801–747900 ==
back to top

Designation			Discovery			Properties		Ref
Permanent	Provisional	Named after	Date	Site	Discoverer(s)	Category	Diam.	Ref
747801	2013 AO_{161}	—	February 1, 2009	Mount Lemmon	Mount Lemmon Survey	·	1.1 km	MPC · JPL
747802	2013 AX_{161}	—	March 11, 2005	Mount Lemmon	Mount Lemmon Survey	BRG	990 m	MPC · JPL
747803	2013 AC_{163}	—	January 30, 2009	Mount Lemmon	Mount Lemmon Survey	·	1.0 km	MPC · JPL
747804	2013 AW_{168}	—	March 10, 2005	Mount Lemmon	Mount Lemmon Survey	BRG	1.0 km	MPC · JPL
747805	2013 AY_{174}	—	November 28, 1999	Kitt Peak	Spacewatch	ADE	1.6 km	MPC · JPL
747806	2013 AP_{175}	—	January 5, 2013	Cerro Tololo	DECam	·	1.4 km	MPC · JPL
747807	2013 AC_{177}	—	January 5, 2013	Cerro Tololo	D. E. Trilling, R. L. Allen	EUN	840 m	MPC · JPL
747808	2013 AQ_{180}	—	January 5, 2013	Cerro Tololo	DECam	·	990 m	MPC · JPL
747809	2013 AF_{181}	—	September 30, 2011	Mount Lemmon	Mount Lemmon Survey	·	1.3 km	MPC · JPL
747810	2013 AB_{184}	—	March 11, 2015	Kitt Peak	Spacewatch	L4	6.9 km	MPC · JPL
747811	2013 AM_{184}	—	January 10, 2013	Mount Lemmon	Mount Lemmon Survey	·	1.5 km	MPC · JPL
747812	2013 AC_{187}	—	September 26, 2011	Haleakala	Pan-STARRS 1	·	1.2 km	MPC · JPL
747813	2013 AW_{188}	—	October 9, 2007	Kitt Peak	Spacewatch	·	1.2 km	MPC · JPL
747814	2013 AK_{189}	—	April 9, 2014	Haleakala	Pan-STARRS 1	·	1.3 km	MPC · JPL
747815	2013 AH_{190}	—	October 13, 2016	Haleakala	Pan-STARRS 1	·	970 m	MPC · JPL
747816	2013 AH_{191}	—	January 5, 2013	Kitt Peak	Spacewatch	(5)	820 m	MPC · JPL
747817	2013 AL_{191}	—	January 10, 2013	Haleakala	Pan-STARRS 1	·	1.2 km	MPC · JPL
747818	2013 AC_{192}	—	January 9, 2013	Mount Lemmon	Mount Lemmon Survey	H	390 m	MPC · JPL
747819	2013 AX_{192}	—	January 9, 2013	Kitt Peak	Spacewatch	MAR	980 m	MPC · JPL
747820	2013 AE_{193}	—	January 10, 2013	Haleakala	Pan-STARRS 1	HNS	920 m	MPC · JPL
747821	2013 AW_{193}	—	January 9, 2013	Mount Lemmon	Mount Lemmon Survey	·	1.2 km	MPC · JPL
747822	2013 AR_{194}	—	October 17, 2017	Mount Lemmon	Mount Lemmon Survey	·	2.5 km	MPC · JPL
747823	2013 AB_{195}	—	March 5, 2016	Haleakala	Pan-STARRS 1	L4	7.2 km	MPC · JPL
747824	2013 AR_{197}	—	January 10, 2013	Haleakala	Pan-STARRS 1	·	520 m	MPC · JPL
747825	2013 AA_{198}	—	January 9, 2013	Kitt Peak	Spacewatch	·	1.5 km	MPC · JPL
747826	2013 AN_{199}	—	January 10, 2013	Haleakala	Pan-STARRS 1	L4 · ERY	6.7 km	MPC · JPL
747827	2013 AQ_{199}	—	January 3, 2013	Mount Lemmon	Mount Lemmon Survey	·	1.2 km	MPC · JPL
747828	2013 AC_{204}	—	September 5, 2010	Mount Lemmon	Mount Lemmon Survey	·	2.7 km	MPC · JPL
747829	2013 AL_{208}	—	January 6, 2013	Kitt Peak	Spacewatch	·	1.1 km	MPC · JPL
747830	2013 BG_{1}	—	December 6, 2011	Haleakala	Pan-STARRS 1	L4	6.7 km	MPC · JPL
747831	2013 BU_{3}	—	February 1, 2009	Kitt Peak	Spacewatch	EUN	1.0 km	MPC · JPL
747832	2013 BN_{12}	—	December 23, 2012	Haleakala	Pan-STARRS 1	·	2.7 km	MPC · JPL
747833	2013 BX_{13}	—	December 14, 2012	Calar Alto	Mottola, S.	·	1.3 km	MPC · JPL
747834	2013 BN_{15}	—	January 17, 2013	Haleakala	Pan-STARRS 1	MAR	860 m	MPC · JPL
747835	2013 BD_{20}	—	February 3, 2009	Kitt Peak	Spacewatch	·	1.2 km	MPC · JPL
747836	2013 BG_{20}	—	November 4, 2007	Mount Lemmon	Mount Lemmon Survey	·	1.5 km	MPC · JPL
747837	2013 BE_{25}	—	November 26, 2003	Kitt Peak	Spacewatch	·	1.4 km	MPC · JPL
747838	2013 BQ_{25}	—	October 1, 2011	Piszkéstető	K. Sárneczky	MAR	880 m	MPC · JPL
747839	2013 BY_{25}	—	September 4, 2011	Haleakala	Pan-STARRS 1	·	1.3 km	MPC · JPL
747840	2013 BC_{29}	—	December 9, 2012	Mount Lemmon	Mount Lemmon Survey	ADE	1.9 km	MPC · JPL
747841	2013 BD_{32}	—	March 9, 2005	Catalina	CSS	·	1.0 km	MPC · JPL
747842	2013 BQ_{33}	—	July 31, 2011	Mayhill-ISON	L. Elenin	PHO	1.0 km	MPC · JPL
747843	2013 BH_{34}	—	August 31, 2011	Haleakala	Pan-STARRS 1	·	1.2 km	MPC · JPL
747844	2013 BP_{35}	—	January 16, 2009	Kitt Peak	Spacewatch	·	1.1 km	MPC · JPL
747845	2013 BL_{36}	—	January 17, 2013	Haleakala	Pan-STARRS 1	·	1.2 km	MPC · JPL
747846	2013 BR_{44}	—	January 19, 2013	Kitt Peak	Spacewatch	·	890 m	MPC · JPL
747847	2013 BX_{44}	—	January 18, 2013	Haleakala	Pan-STARRS 1	L4	6.8 km	MPC · JPL
747848	2013 BC_{46}	—	September 2, 2011	Haleakala	Pan-STARRS 1	ADE	1.9 km	MPC · JPL
747849	2013 BW_{49}	—	January 17, 2009	Kitt Peak	Spacewatch	·	1.2 km	MPC · JPL
747850	2013 BL_{50}	—	September 18, 2003	Palomar	NEAT	·	950 m	MPC · JPL
747851	2013 BL_{52}	—	November 9, 2007	Kitt Peak	Spacewatch	·	1.3 km	MPC · JPL
747852	2013 BM_{52}	—	September 4, 2007	Mount Lemmon	Mount Lemmon Survey	·	1.2 km	MPC · JPL
747853	2013 BW_{52}	—	December 13, 2012	Kitt Peak	Spacewatch	·	970 m	MPC · JPL
747854	2013 BG_{55}	—	August 27, 2011	Haleakala	Pan-STARRS 1	·	1.3 km	MPC · JPL
747855	2013 BG_{59}	—	December 14, 2012	Tenerife	ESA OGS	·	1.1 km	MPC · JPL
747856	2013 BO_{60}	—	December 21, 2012	Mount Lemmon	Mount Lemmon Survey	·	1.3 km	MPC · JPL
747857	2013 BA_{65}	—	January 6, 2013	Kitt Peak	Spacewatch	EUN	880 m	MPC · JPL
747858	2013 BY_{68}	—	January 7, 2013	Kitt Peak	Spacewatch	L4	7.1 km	MPC · JPL
747859	2013 BD_{69}	—	January 20, 2013	Kitt Peak	Spacewatch	·	1.6 km	MPC · JPL
747860	2013 BV_{73}	—	January 31, 2013	Haleakala	Pan-STARRS 1	H	430 m	MPC · JPL
747861	2013 BN_{75}	—	October 11, 1999	Socorro	LINEAR	·	860 m	MPC · JPL
747862	2013 BK_{76}	—	January 22, 2013	Haleakala	Pan-STARRS 1	·	840 m	MPC · JPL
747863	2013 BH_{79}	—	January 31, 2013	Kitt Peak	Spacewatch	·	540 m	MPC · JPL
747864	2013 BM_{79}	—	December 13, 2012	Mount Lemmon	Mount Lemmon Survey	·	880 m	MPC · JPL
747865	2013 BG_{80}	—	January 31, 2013	Haleakala	Pan-STARRS 1	H	420 m	MPC · JPL
747866	2013 BF_{83}	—	September 10, 2007	Mount Lemmon	Mount Lemmon Survey	·	840 m	MPC · JPL
747867	2013 BC_{85}	—	January 20, 2013	Kitt Peak	Spacewatch	·	860 m	MPC · JPL
747868	2013 BR_{85}	—	September 26, 2017	Haleakala	Pan-STARRS 1	VER	2.2 km	MPC · JPL
747869	2013 BD_{86}	—	January 16, 2013	Haleakala	Pan-STARRS 1	·	1.2 km	MPC · JPL
747870	2013 BF_{86}	—	July 10, 2005	Kitt Peak	Spacewatch	·	1.4 km	MPC · JPL
747871	2013 BF_{87}	—	January 19, 2013	Kitt Peak	Spacewatch	·	860 m	MPC · JPL
747872	2013 BM_{87}	—	January 17, 2013	Mount Lemmon	Mount Lemmon Survey	·	990 m	MPC · JPL
747873	2013 BR_{87}	—	January 20, 2013	Kitt Peak	Spacewatch	(5)	1.0 km	MPC · JPL
747874	2013 BC_{88}	—	May 26, 2015	Mount Lemmon	Mount Lemmon Survey	·	3.8 km	MPC · JPL
747875	2013 BF_{88}	—	June 19, 2014	Haleakala	Pan-STARRS 1	·	1.1 km	MPC · JPL
747876	2013 BM_{88}	—	January 17, 2013	Mount Lemmon	Mount Lemmon Survey	HNS	840 m	MPC · JPL
747877	2013 BP_{88}	—	January 19, 2013	Kitt Peak	Spacewatch	·	1.2 km	MPC · JPL
747878	2013 BU_{89}	—	January 17, 2013	Mount Lemmon	Mount Lemmon Survey	·	2.3 km	MPC · JPL
747879	2013 BZ_{89}	—	May 23, 2014	Haleakala	Pan-STARRS 1	·	1.6 km	MPC · JPL
747880	2013 BK_{90}	—	January 17, 2013	Mount Lemmon	Mount Lemmon Survey	·	1.7 km	MPC · JPL
747881	2013 BC_{91}	—	January 22, 2013	Kitt Peak	Spacewatch	·	2.9 km	MPC · JPL
747882	2013 BR_{95}	—	January 18, 2013	Kitt Peak	Spacewatch	CLO	1.7 km	MPC · JPL
747883	2013 BV_{95}	—	January 20, 2013	Kitt Peak	Spacewatch	·	940 m	MPC · JPL
747884	2013 BW_{95}	—	January 16, 2013	Mount Lemmon	Mount Lemmon Survey	·	1.7 km	MPC · JPL
747885	2013 BN_{96}	—	January 17, 2013	Haleakala	Pan-STARRS 1	·	680 m	MPC · JPL
747886	2013 BS_{96}	—	January 17, 2013	Haleakala	Pan-STARRS 1	(5)	840 m	MPC · JPL
747887	2013 BC_{97}	—	January 31, 2013	Nogales	M. Schwartz, P. R. Holvorcem	·	1.2 km	MPC · JPL
747888	2013 CO	—	January 17, 2013	Haleakala	Pan-STARRS 1	·	1.7 km	MPC · JPL
747889	2013 CR_{1}	—	January 18, 2013	Kitt Peak	Spacewatch	·	2.4 km	MPC · JPL
747890	2013 CY_{2}	—	January 5, 2013	Mount Lemmon	Mount Lemmon Survey	(194)	1.6 km	MPC · JPL
747891	2013 CP_{3}	—	January 20, 2013	Kitt Peak	Spacewatch	·	1.4 km	MPC · JPL
747892	2013 CE_{5}	—	January 10, 2013	Kitt Peak	Spacewatch	EUN	1.1 km	MPC · JPL
747893	2013 CG_{5}	—	February 2, 2013	Mount Lemmon	Mount Lemmon Survey	·	1.1 km	MPC · JPL
747894	2013 CH_{6}	—	January 10, 2013	Haleakala	Pan-STARRS 1	L4	7.4 km	MPC · JPL
747895	2013 CS_{9}	—	December 16, 2012	Oukaïmeden	C. Rinner	EUN	1.0 km	MPC · JPL
747896	2013 CM_{14}	—	November 15, 2007	Mount Lemmon	Mount Lemmon Survey	·	1.1 km	MPC · JPL
747897	2013 CN_{17}	—	February 1, 2013	Kitt Peak	Spacewatch	·	2.1 km	MPC · JPL
747898	2013 CS_{18}	—	April 2, 2009	Kitt Peak	Spacewatch	·	1.2 km	MPC · JPL
747899	2013 CR_{24}	—	September 12, 2007	Mount Lemmon	Mount Lemmon Survey	·	1.4 km	MPC · JPL
747900	2013 CF_{27}	—	February 3, 2013	Haleakala	Pan-STARRS 1	·	1.1 km	MPC · JPL

== 747901–748000 ==
back to top

Designation			Discovery			Properties		Ref
Permanent	Provisional	Named after	Date	Site	Discoverer(s)	Category	Diam.	Ref
747901	2013 CB_{28}	—	January 6, 2013	Kitt Peak	Spacewatch	·	1.5 km	MPC · JPL
747902	2013 CJ_{32}	—	February 5, 2013	Haleakala	Pan-STARRS 1	·	1.1 km	MPC · JPL
747903	2013 CL_{34}	—	September 5, 2010	Mount Lemmon	Mount Lemmon Survey	·	2.3 km	MPC · JPL
747904	2013 CT_{38}	—	September 15, 2003	Palomar	NEAT	BAR	1.4 km	MPC · JPL
747905	2013 CG_{39}	—	September 20, 2011	Haleakala	Pan-STARRS 1	·	1.2 km	MPC · JPL
747906	2013 CH_{40}	—	February 1, 2013	Haleakala	Pan-STARRS 1	·	1.3 km	MPC · JPL
747907	2013 CE_{42}	—	February 3, 2013	Haleakala	Pan-STARRS 1	·	1.6 km	MPC · JPL
747908	2013 CR_{44}	—	February 5, 2013	Kitt Peak	Spacewatch	·	1.5 km	MPC · JPL
747909	2013 CW_{44}	—	August 1, 2011	Siding Spring	SSS	·	1.7 km	MPC · JPL
747910	2013 CB_{46}	—	February 5, 2013	Catalina	CSS	·	1.4 km	MPC · JPL
747911	2013 CV_{46}	—	October 20, 2011	Mount Lemmon	Mount Lemmon Survey	PAD	1.3 km	MPC · JPL
747912	2013 CJ_{49}	—	January 20, 2013	Kitt Peak	Spacewatch	·	570 m	MPC · JPL
747913	2013 CQ_{50}	—	February 6, 2013	Oukaïmeden	C. Rinner	HNS	900 m	MPC · JPL
747914	2013 CV_{54}	—	February 7, 2013	Kitt Peak	Spacewatch	·	1.5 km	MPC · JPL
747915	2013 CO_{56}	—	January 17, 2013	Mount Lemmon	Mount Lemmon Survey	PHO	860 m	MPC · JPL
747916	2013 CE_{57}	—	February 9, 2013	Oukaïmeden	C. Rinner	·	1.1 km	MPC · JPL
747917	2013 CM_{61}	—	October 24, 2011	Haleakala	Pan-STARRS 1	·	1.6 km	MPC · JPL
747918	2013 CT_{61}	—	January 20, 2013	Kitt Peak	Spacewatch	·	1.4 km	MPC · JPL
747919	2013 CK_{64}	—	January 11, 2000	Kitt Peak	Spacewatch	·	1.2 km	MPC · JPL
747920	2013 CS_{65}	—	February 5, 2013	Nogales	M. Schwartz, P. R. Holvorcem	EUN	1.1 km	MPC · JPL
747921	2013 CY_{66}	—	December 31, 2007	Kitt Peak	Spacewatch	·	1.7 km	MPC · JPL
747922	2013 CW_{73}	—	October 3, 2003	Kitt Peak	Spacewatch	·	1.3 km	MPC · JPL
747923	2013 CK_{75}	—	October 22, 2003	Apache Point	SDSS	·	1.2 km	MPC · JPL
747924	2013 CE_{78}	—	February 8, 2013	Haleakala	Pan-STARRS 1	·	1.8 km	MPC · JPL
747925	2013 CT_{80}	—	February 23, 2009	Calar Alto	F. Hormuth	·	950 m	MPC · JPL
747926	2013 CP_{82}	—	October 24, 2009	Mount Lemmon	Mount Lemmon Survey	H	480 m	MPC · JPL
747927	2013 CJ_{83}	—	September 4, 2011	Haleakala	Pan-STARRS 1	·	1.5 km	MPC · JPL
747928	2013 CP_{85}	—	August 10, 2007	Kitt Peak	Spacewatch	·	810 m	MPC · JPL
747929	2013 CH_{86}	—	December 9, 2012	Kitt Peak	Spacewatch	MAR	1.2 km	MPC · JPL
747930	2013 CT_{86}	—	February 8, 2013	Kitt Peak	Spacewatch	·	1.1 km	MPC · JPL
747931	2013 CQ_{88}	—	February 12, 2013	Haleakala	Pan-STARRS 1	H	470 m	MPC · JPL
747932	2013 CS_{88}	—	December 7, 2012	Haleakala	Pan-STARRS 1	·	1.2 km	MPC · JPL
747933	2013 CD_{91}	—	February 8, 2013	Haleakala	Pan-STARRS 1	EUN	1.0 km	MPC · JPL
747934	2013 CJ_{93}	—	October 15, 2007	Kitt Peak	Spacewatch	·	1.0 km	MPC · JPL
747935	2013 CQ_{96}	—	September 24, 2008	Mount Lemmon	Mount Lemmon Survey	·	580 m	MPC · JPL
747936	2013 CC_{101}	—	February 8, 2013	Haleakala	Pan-STARRS 1	·	1.3 km	MPC · JPL
747937	2013 CY_{101}	—	January 17, 2013	Oukaïmeden	C. Rinner	·	1.6 km	MPC · JPL
747938	2013 CY_{103}	—	January 19, 2013	Kitt Peak	Spacewatch	NEM	2.2 km	MPC · JPL
747939	2013 CH_{107}	—	February 9, 2013	Haleakala	Pan-STARRS 1	AEO	850 m	MPC · JPL
747940	2013 CN_{112}	—	February 9, 2013	Haleakala	Pan-STARRS 1	NYS	800 m	MPC · JPL
747941	2013 CR_{112}	—	August 31, 2011	Haleakala	G. Sostero	·	2.1 km	MPC · JPL
747942	2013 CJ_{116}	—	February 5, 2013	Kitt Peak	Spacewatch	·	1.9 km	MPC · JPL
747943	2013 CU_{119}	—	February 8, 2013	Mount Lemmon	Mount Lemmon Survey	·	1.7 km	MPC · JPL
747944	2013 CB_{120}	—	September 27, 2003	Apache Point	SDSS	EUN	1.0 km	MPC · JPL
747945	2013 CF_{120}	—	November 19, 2003	Socorro	LINEAR	·	1.0 km	MPC · JPL
747946	2013 CK_{121}	—	February 8, 2013	Haleakala	Pan-STARRS 1	·	1.9 km	MPC · JPL
747947	2013 CG_{123}	—	January 6, 2013	Catalina	CSS	·	1.7 km	MPC · JPL
747948	2013 CT_{124}	—	February 5, 2013	Kitt Peak	Spacewatch	NYS	970 m	MPC · JPL
747949	2013 CD_{125}	—	February 13, 2013	Tenerife	ESA OGS	EUN	1.0 km	MPC · JPL
747950	2013 CX_{125}	—	February 13, 2013	Haleakala	Pan-STARRS 1	·	1.4 km	MPC · JPL
747951	2013 CM_{126}	—	January 10, 2013	Kitt Peak	Spacewatch	HNS	1.1 km	MPC · JPL
747952	2013 CF_{127}	—	December 5, 2007	Kitt Peak	Spacewatch	NEM	1.9 km	MPC · JPL
747953	2013 CQ_{127}	—	February 14, 2013	Oukaïmeden	C. Rinner	HNS	1.1 km	MPC · JPL
747954	2013 CJ_{128}	—	February 14, 2013	Haleakala	Pan-STARRS 1	·	1.1 km	MPC · JPL
747955	2013 CS_{130}	—	February 8, 2013	Kitt Peak	Spacewatch	HNS	1.1 km	MPC · JPL
747956	2013 CR_{131}	—	January 9, 2013	Mount Lemmon	Mount Lemmon Survey	·	1.6 km	MPC · JPL
747957	2013 CX_{131}	—	February 5, 2013	Kitt Peak	Spacewatch	·	1.4 km	MPC · JPL
747958	2013 CB_{132}	—	February 5, 2013	Kitt Peak	Spacewatch	·	1.6 km	MPC · JPL
747959	2013 CE_{133}	—	February 1, 2013	Kitt Peak	Spacewatch	L4	8.1 km	MPC · JPL
747960	2013 CU_{133}	—	February 15, 2013	Oukaïmeden	C. Rinner	·	1.4 km	MPC · JPL
747961	2013 CC_{136}	—	November 23, 2011	Mount Lemmon	Mount Lemmon Survey	·	1.7 km	MPC · JPL
747962	2013 CN_{137}	—	February 5, 2013	Kitt Peak	Spacewatch	H	400 m	MPC · JPL
747963	2013 CO_{141}	—	October 23, 2011	Mount Lemmon	Mount Lemmon Survey	AGN	1.0 km	MPC · JPL
747964	2013 CH_{142}	—	February 14, 2013	Kitt Peak	Spacewatch	·	700 m	MPC · JPL
747965	2013 CX_{142}	—	February 14, 2013	Tenerife	ESA OGS	·	1.3 km	MPC · JPL
747966	2013 CS_{143}	—	March 19, 2009	Mount Lemmon	Mount Lemmon Survey	·	1.5 km	MPC · JPL
747967	2013 CJ_{145}	—	February 12, 2000	Apache Point	SDSS	·	610 m	MPC · JPL
747968	2013 CC_{146}	—	February 14, 2013	Mount Lemmon	Mount Lemmon Survey	·	1.4 km	MPC · JPL
747969	2013 CM_{150}	—	January 9, 2013	Mount Lemmon	Mount Lemmon Survey	·	1.6 km	MPC · JPL
747970	2013 CV_{151}	—	October 21, 2011	Westfield	R. Holmes	·	1.6 km	MPC · JPL
747971	2013 CF_{154}	—	February 16, 2013	Mount Lemmon	Mount Lemmon Survey	·	1.4 km	MPC · JPL
747972	2013 CY_{154}	—	February 16, 2004	Kitt Peak	Spacewatch	·	1.4 km	MPC · JPL
747973	2013 CN_{156}	—	October 24, 2011	Haleakala	Pan-STARRS 1	·	1.5 km	MPC · JPL
747974	2013 CP_{161}	—	February 14, 2013	Haleakala	Pan-STARRS 1	·	1.5 km	MPC · JPL
747975	2013 CX_{165}	—	February 14, 2013	Haleakala	Pan-STARRS 1	·	790 m	MPC · JPL
747976	2013 CB_{167}	—	September 25, 2006	Kitt Peak	Spacewatch	·	1.6 km	MPC · JPL
747977	2013 CF_{167}	—	February 5, 2013	Kitt Peak	Spacewatch	(13314)	1.4 km	MPC · JPL
747978	2013 CS_{168}	—	October 19, 2006	Kitt Peak	Deep Ecliptic Survey	·	1.5 km	MPC · JPL
747979	2013 CG_{171}	—	May 16, 2009	Kitt Peak	Spacewatch	·	1.5 km	MPC · JPL
747980	2013 CE_{177}	—	February 8, 2013	Mount Lemmon	Mount Lemmon Survey	·	1.3 km	MPC · JPL
747981	2013 CB_{180}	—	February 9, 2013	Haleakala	Pan-STARRS 1	EUN	1.2 km	MPC · JPL
747982	2013 CJ_{180}	—	September 27, 2012	Haleakala	Pan-STARRS 1	·	2.8 km	MPC · JPL
747983	2013 CD_{181}	—	January 22, 2013	Mount Lemmon	Mount Lemmon Survey	H	420 m	MPC · JPL
747984	2013 CM_{183}	—	February 6, 2013	Mayhill-ISON	L. Elenin	·	1.1 km	MPC · JPL
747985	2013 CW_{184}	—	February 7, 2013	Nogales	M. Schwartz, P. R. Holvorcem	·	1.2 km	MPC · JPL
747986	2013 CY_{184}	—	February 7, 2013	Nogales	M. Schwartz, P. R. Holvorcem	·	1.7 km	MPC · JPL
747987	2013 CH_{185}	—	February 8, 2013	Mayhill-ISON	L. Elenin	·	1.6 km	MPC · JPL
747988	2013 CP_{186}	—	February 8, 2013	Haleakala	Pan-STARRS 1	·	1.6 km	MPC · JPL
747989	2013 CW_{186}	—	March 17, 2009	Kitt Peak	Spacewatch	·	1.6 km	MPC · JPL
747990	2013 CV_{187}	—	January 9, 2013	Kitt Peak	Spacewatch	EUN	1.1 km	MPC · JPL
747991	2013 CC_{189}	—	February 26, 2009	Cerro Burek	I. de la Cueva	·	1.3 km	MPC · JPL
747992	2013 CL_{191}	—	February 11, 2013	Catalina	CSS	·	1.8 km	MPC · JPL
747993	2013 CQ_{192}	—	April 10, 2005	Kitt Peak	Spacewatch	·	1.3 km	MPC · JPL
747994	2013 CE_{193}	—	February 15, 2013	Haleakala	Pan-STARRS 1	JUN	760 m	MPC · JPL
747995	2013 CN_{198}	—	February 16, 2013	Mount Lemmon	Mount Lemmon Survey	·	860 m	MPC · JPL
747996	2013 CE_{202}	—	February 9, 2013	Haleakala	Pan-STARRS 1	·	1.5 km	MPC · JPL
747997	2013 CT_{202}	—	October 6, 2008	Mount Lemmon	Mount Lemmon Survey	·	550 m	MPC · JPL
747998	2013 CP_{204}	—	October 31, 2007	Mount Lemmon	Mount Lemmon Survey	·	1.2 km	MPC · JPL
747999	2013 CG_{206}	—	January 10, 2013	Haleakala	Pan-STARRS 1	·	1.4 km	MPC · JPL
748000	2013 CF_{207}	—	February 11, 2013	Catalina	CSS	·	1.5 km	MPC · JPL

back to top

== Meaning of names ==
As minor planet discoveries are confirmed, they are given a permanent number by the IAU's Minor Planet Center (MPC), and the discoverers can then submit names for them, following the IAU's naming conventions. The list below concerns those minor planets in the specified number-range that have received names, and explains the meanings of those names.

Official naming citations of newly named small Solar System bodies are approved and published in a bulletin by IAU's Working Group for Small Bodies Nomenclature (WGSBN). Before May 2021, citations were published in MPC's Minor Planet Circulars for many decades. Recent citations can also be found on the JPL Small-Body Database (SBDB). Until his death in 2016, German astronomer Lutz D. Schmadel compiled these citations into the Dictionary of Minor Planet Names (DMP) and regularly updated the collection.

Based on Paul Herget's The Names of the Minor Planets, Schmadel also researched the unclear origin of numerous asteroids, most of which had been named prior to World War II. This article incorporates text from this source, which is in the public domain: SBDB New namings may only be added to this list below after official publication as the preannouncement of names is condemned. The WGSBN publishes a comprehensive guideline for the naming rules of non-cometary small Solar System bodies.

Named minor planet	Provisional	This minor planet was named for...	Ref · Catalog
747532 Davidabrown	2012 VA_{115}	David A. Brown (b. 1967), American Jesuit priest and astronomer.	IAU · 747532
