= Associazione Friulana di Astronomia e Meteorologia =

The Associazione Friulana di Astronomia e Meteorologia (AFAM, eng. Friulian Association of Astronomy and Meteorology) is a non-profit cultural association whose goal is the promotion of astronomy and meteorology to the public and the development of scientific research activities, often in collaboration with professional scientists.

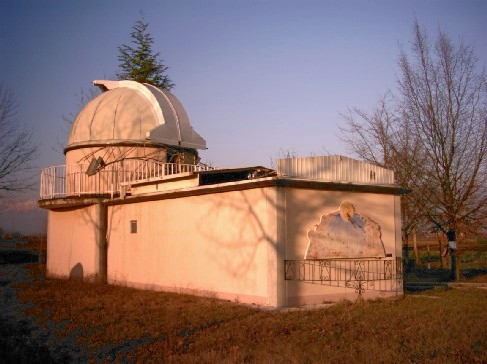
The astronomical observatory of the Associazione Friulana di Astronomia e Meteorologia.

Established in 1969, now AFAM has its own operating structures in Remanzacco (Friuli, Italy).

AFAM is member of the Unione Astrofili Italiani (the Italian union of amateur astronomers).

The Association has an own library, a conference room, a permanent Astronomical Observatory with optical instruments for visual observation and CCD sensors for research.

== Members ==
- Luca Donato, president
- Giovanni Sostero

== See also ==
- List of astronomical societies
