= Giovanni Sostero =

Italian astronomer

Giovanni Sostero (18 March 1964 – 6 December 2012) was an Italian amateur astronomer. He was one of the leading members of the Associazione Friulana di Astronomia e Meteorologia (Friuli, Italy). He was an honorary member of the Astronomical Observatory of Visnjan (Croatia), too.

Sostero was very active as a public out-reacher and has published some scientific works in professional astronomical journals. He had over 1880 NASA ADS citations for his work. His main research fields were the minor bodies of the Solar System (asteroids and comets) and variable stars (symbiotic stars and supernovae). In particular, he discovered several supernovae: 2009jp, 2008ae, 2008F, 2007cl, 2006br, 2006bm, 2006H, 2006B, 2005ly, 2005kz, 2005kc. In 2000 he co-discovered a nova in the galaxy M31.

The asteroid 9878 Sostero (1994 FQ) was named after him.

He died on 6 December 2012 due to the complications of a heart attack. He was 48 years old.

The "Giovanni Sostero Award" was created in 2013 and supported thereafter by Elettra - Sincrotrone Trieste to honor Sostero, formerly in charge of the soft x-ray metrology laboratory at the facility.
