= AFU =

AFU may refer to:

== Language ==
- Afu, the native name of the Eloyi language, a language spoken in Nigeria
- Efutu language (ISO 639-3 code: AFU), a Guang language spoken in coastal Ghana

== Organizations and companies ==
- Armed Forces of Ukraine, the military forces of Ukraine
- Abingdon Film Unit, an English animated film association
- Advanced Flying Unit, a British Royal Air Force squadron code
- AFU Goodfriends, an associated music act of Even Steven Levee
- Agriculture and Forestry University, a public agricultural university in Nepal
- Age-Friendly University Global Network, a consortium of higher education institutions
- Aktiengesellschaft für Flugzeugunternehmungen, a Swiss aircraft manufacturer
- Al Falah University, Dubai, United Arab Emirates
- Al-Falah University, Haryana, India
- All for Unity, a political and electoral alliance in Scotland
- Archives for UFO Research, a Swedish depository of materials and works about ufology
- Association Footballers' Union, a labour union of football players in England from 1898–1901
- Athletic Federation of Uzbekistan, maintains Uzbekistani records in athletics

== People ==
- Afu Agbaria (born 1949), Israeli Arab politician
- Afu-Ra (born 1974), American underground rapper
- Paki Afu (born 1990), New Zealand rugby league player
- A-fu (born 1987), Taiwanese singer

== Other ==
- "A.F.U. (Naturally Wired)", a song on the 1988 Van Halen album OU812
- Afrinat International Airlines (ICAO code: AFU), a West African airline active from 2002–2004
- Aspergillus fumigatus non-coding RNAs, as an abbreviation
- Accelerator Functional Unit, a term for a hardware execution unit

== See also ==
- A Fu, Chinese clay figurines
- Afus, Iran
- Afuw ("Forgiving"), one of the 99 names for Allah (God) in Islam
- AF (disambiguation)
