= AFY =

AFY may refer to:

- Acre-foot per year, a unit of flow, equal to about 1,233 cubic metres per year
- Adventure for Youth, an LDS Church program related to Especially for Youth
- AFY, a vehicle model of Österreichische Automobil-Fabrik, an Austrian car and truck manufacturer
- Afy Fletcher (born 1987), Grenadian cricketer
- Aphrodite ('Afy') Hallijohn, fictional character in the novel East Lynne, by Ellen Wood and its adaptations

== See also ==
- AF (disambiguation)
- Affy
