= Xi Axing =

Chinese painter

Xi Axing (Chinese: 奚阿兴; born January 28, 1944), also known mononymously as Axing, is a Chinese painter.

Xi was born in Huangpu District, Shanghai. His active career started in 1978 when art schools and professional organisations were reinstated after the Cultural Revolution. At that time, Axing was an art editor at the Shanghai Children's Publishing House. He quickly became renowned for his engravings and oil paintings. His most famous works include "Serenade" (小夜曲), "Candlelight" (烛光, 2001), "Girl with a bird" (少女与鸟), "Water", "Pounding cloth map" and "Warehouse".

Axing rarely portrays real people, mostly taking his inspiration for the subjects and associated colours, lines and shapes from Chinese folk art, especially traditional Wuxi clay figurines.

His creations are exhibited in many Chinese art museums such as the China Art Museum and the Liu Haisu Art Museum, as well as in private collections in Europe and the United States. He has participated in many national and international art exhibitions.
