= AFQ =

AFQ may refer to:

- Alba Servizi Aerotrasporti, ICAO code for the Alba, Piedmont, Italy airport
- American Financial Group, alternate NYSE symbol
- Afloqualone
- AFQ_{1}, metabolite of aflatoxin
- AFQ-056 (Mavoglurant), experimental drug candidate

== See also ==
- AF (disambiguation)
- FAQ
