= Gräf & Stift =

Austrian vehicle manufacturer

Gräf & Stift logo used in the 1960s

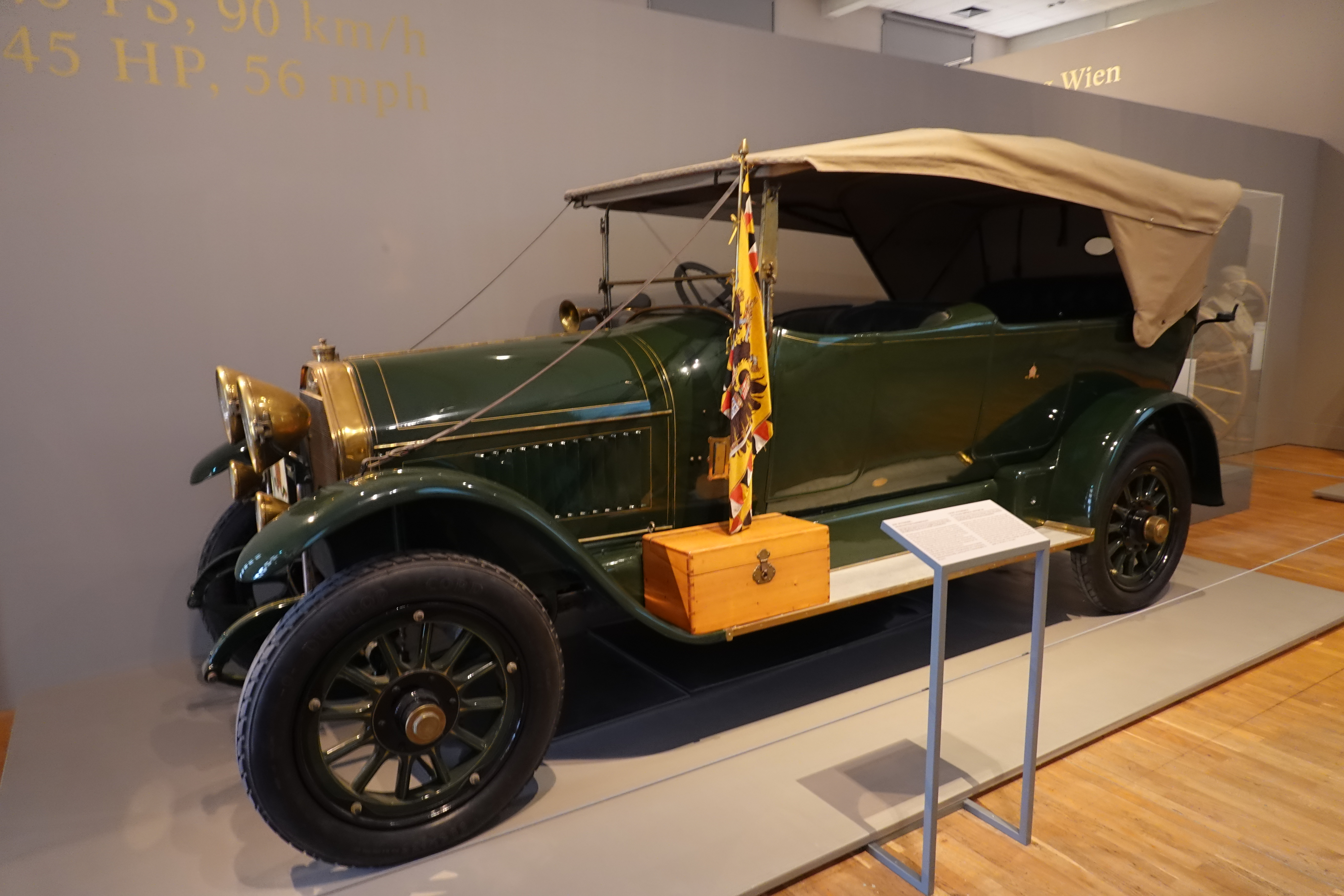
Gräf & Stift 40/45 PS Imperial Car

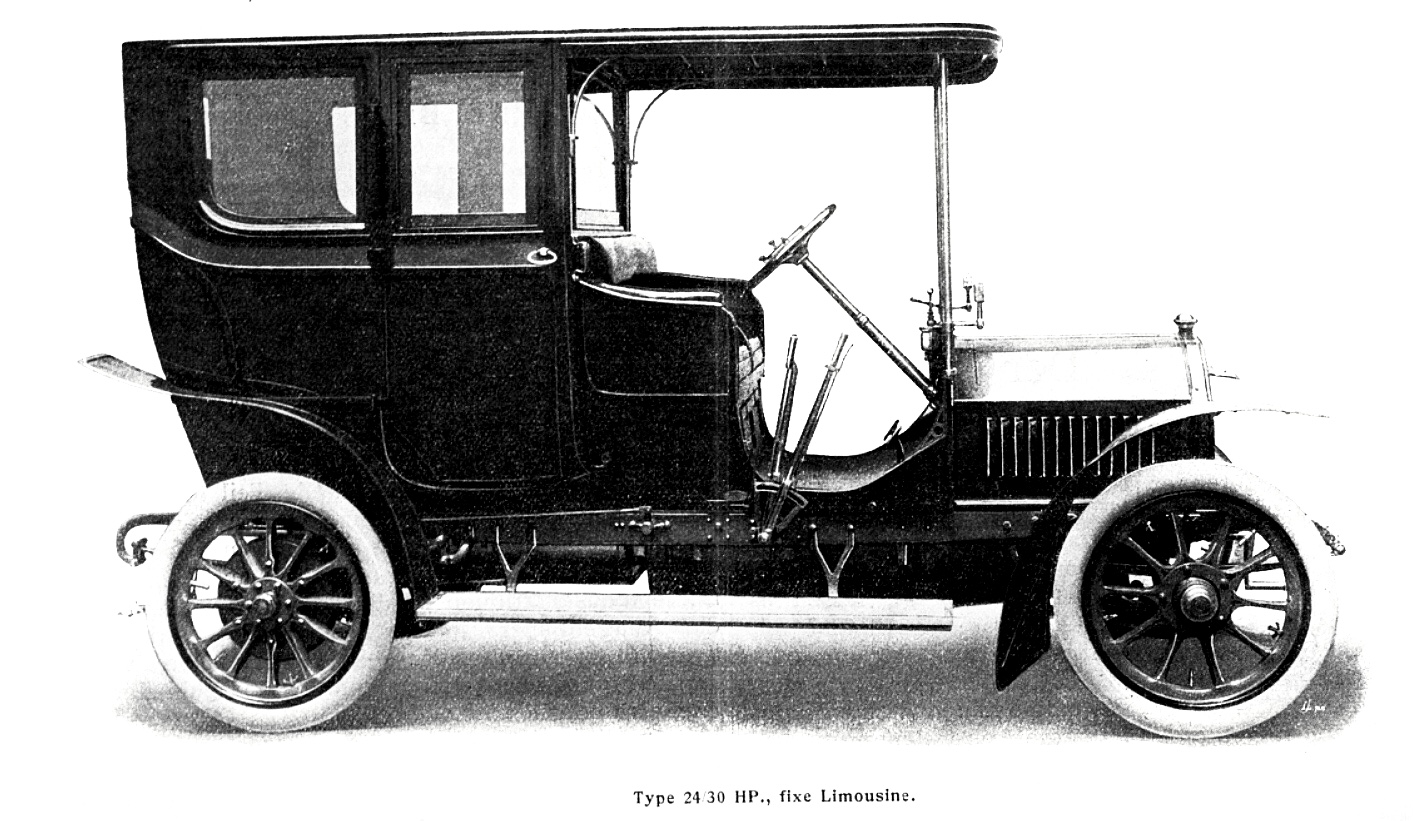
Gräf & Stift 24-30 (1906)

Gräf & Stift was an Austrian manufacturer of automobiles, trucks, buses and trolleybuses, from 1902 until 2001, latterly as a subsidiary of MAN.

It was founded by the brothers Franz, Heinrich and Karl Gräf, and the investor, Wilhelm Stift.

The company was a well-known manufacturer of luxury automobiles, including the Double Phaeton that carried Archduke Franz Ferdinand and his wife, Sophie, when they were assassinated in Sarajevo in June 1914. The car is on display at the Museum of Military History, Vienna.

By the 1930s Gräf & Stift had begun making trucks and buses, and it ceased car manufacturing in 1938. The company merged with Österreichische Automobil Fabriks-AG (ÖAF) in 1971, becoming ÖAF-Gräf & Stift AG, and later the same year was taken over by MAN AG. It continued in business as a subsidiary of MAN, and the Gräf & Stift name remained in use as a MAN brand for the Austrian market and for trolleybuses until 2001, when ÖAF-Gräf & Stift AG was renamed MAN Sonderfahrzeuge AG. It was located in Vienna, and the production facilities continue in use there, but no longer using the Gräf & Stift name.

== The beginnings ==
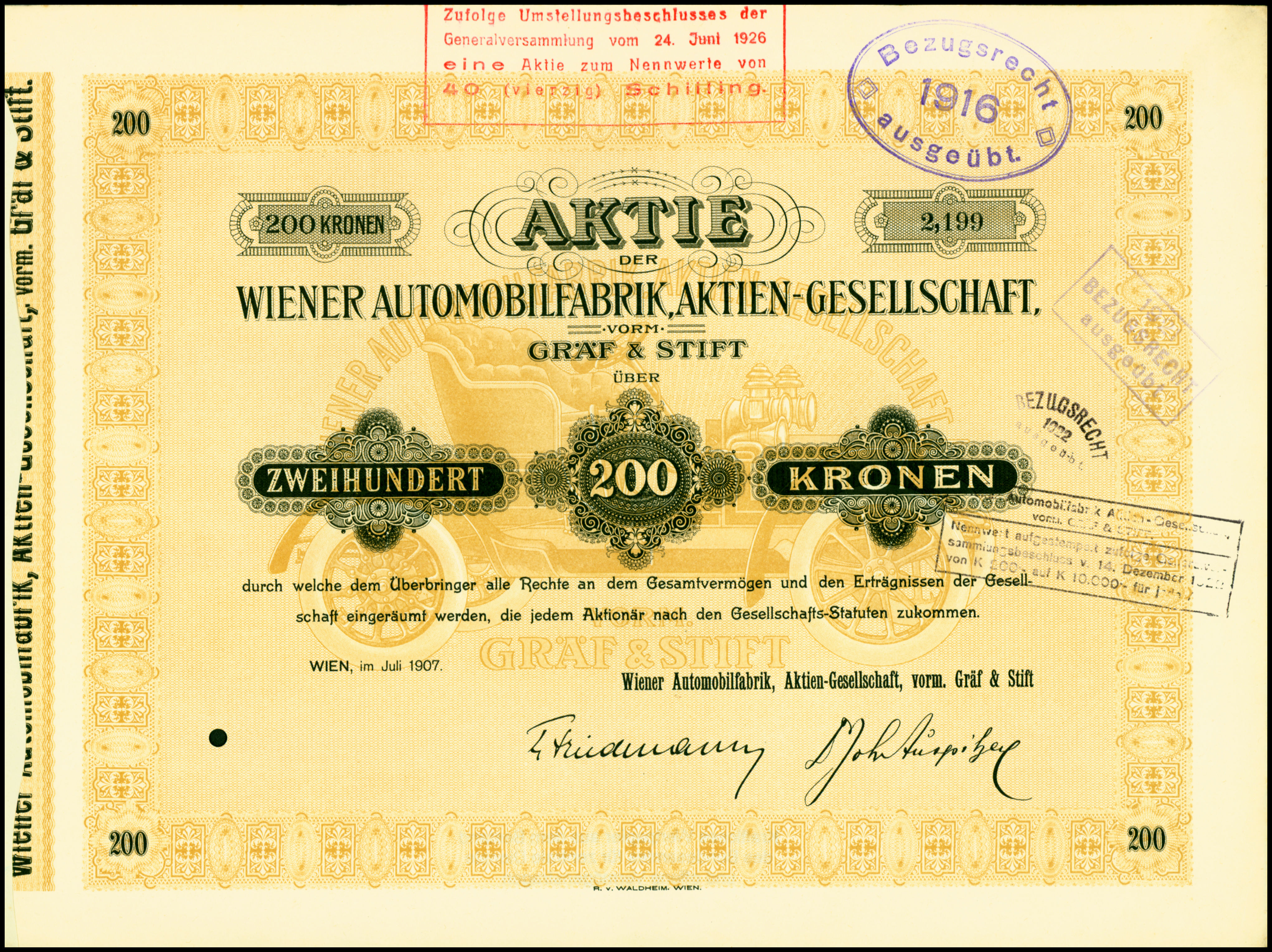
Share of the Wiener Automobilfabrik AG vorm. Gräf & Stift, issued July 1907

The Gräf brothers started a bicycle service workshop in Vienna in 1893, quickly branching out into bicycle manufacturing. Their bicycles sold well, requiring the company to relocate to be able to increase capacity. While the bicycle business in Europe was booming, the brothers also saw potential in the fledgling automobile, and commissioned Josef Kainz to design one. The result was an unusual voiturette with a one-cylinder De Dion-Bouton engine fitted in front of the vehicle, driving the front axle, built sometime between 1895 and 1898, according to various sources. It was thus arguably the world's first front-wheel drive automobile, but it never saw mass production, with only one unit made, even though the technology was eventually patented in 1900. However, the voiturette remained in regular use until 1914 and was in working condition in the early 1970s.

== Partnership with Willy Stift ==
In 1901, the brothers started cooperating with the Austrian businessman Wilhelm (Willy) Stift, an automobile importer who had already ventured into automobile manufacturing under the marque Celeritas. Celeritas automobiles were then assembled using French engines at the Gräf workshops, and in 1904 the gentlemen founded a joint company, named Gräf & Stift. Later, the company manufactured automobiles for the Spitz brand, owned by the automobile vendor Arnold Spitz. When Spitz went bankrupt in 1907, Gräf & Stift started building automobiles under their own brand.

The company concentrated on large, sophisticated and luxurious cars, which became popular with the Austrian aristocracy and even the Habsburg royal family. Apart from luxury cars, Gräf & Stift also became an important manufacturer of buses as well as tram bodies. It is to be remembered that until the Hitler "Anschluss" of 1938 that Austria-Hungary drove on the left as does the United Kingdom and as did Imperial Russia.

== Assassination in Sarajevo ==
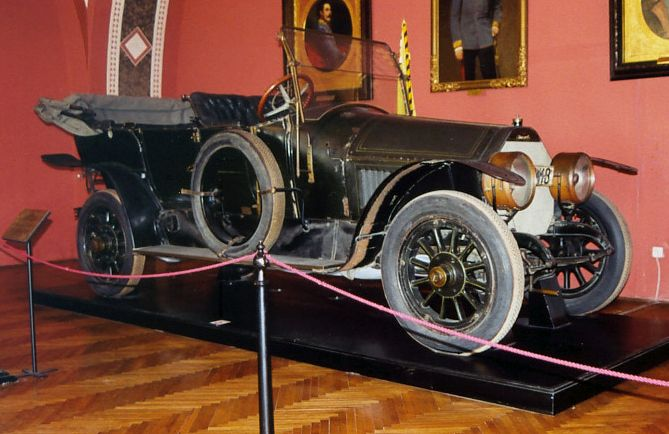
The 1911 model Gräf & Stift Bois de Boulogne double phaeton in which the Archduke Franz Ferdinand was riding at the time of his assassination on 28 June 1914

One of the Gräf & Stift luxury open touring cars, a Bois de Boulogne model double phaeton (engine no. 287), was bought by Count Franz von Harrach on 15 December 1910. Harrach's car was fitted with a four-cylinder engine delivering 32 PS. In 1914 in Sarajevo, the Archduke Franz Ferdinand of Austria and his wife rode together with Harrach in this car, when Gavrilo Princip assassinated the Archduke. The assassination provoked a series of diplomatic manoeuvres that quickly led to declarations of war and the onset of the First World War. Ironically, the license plate of this car reads "A III 118", which can be read as "Armistice, 11/11/1918" - the date the hostilities between Germany and the Entente allies ceased.

== Assassination in Istanbul ==
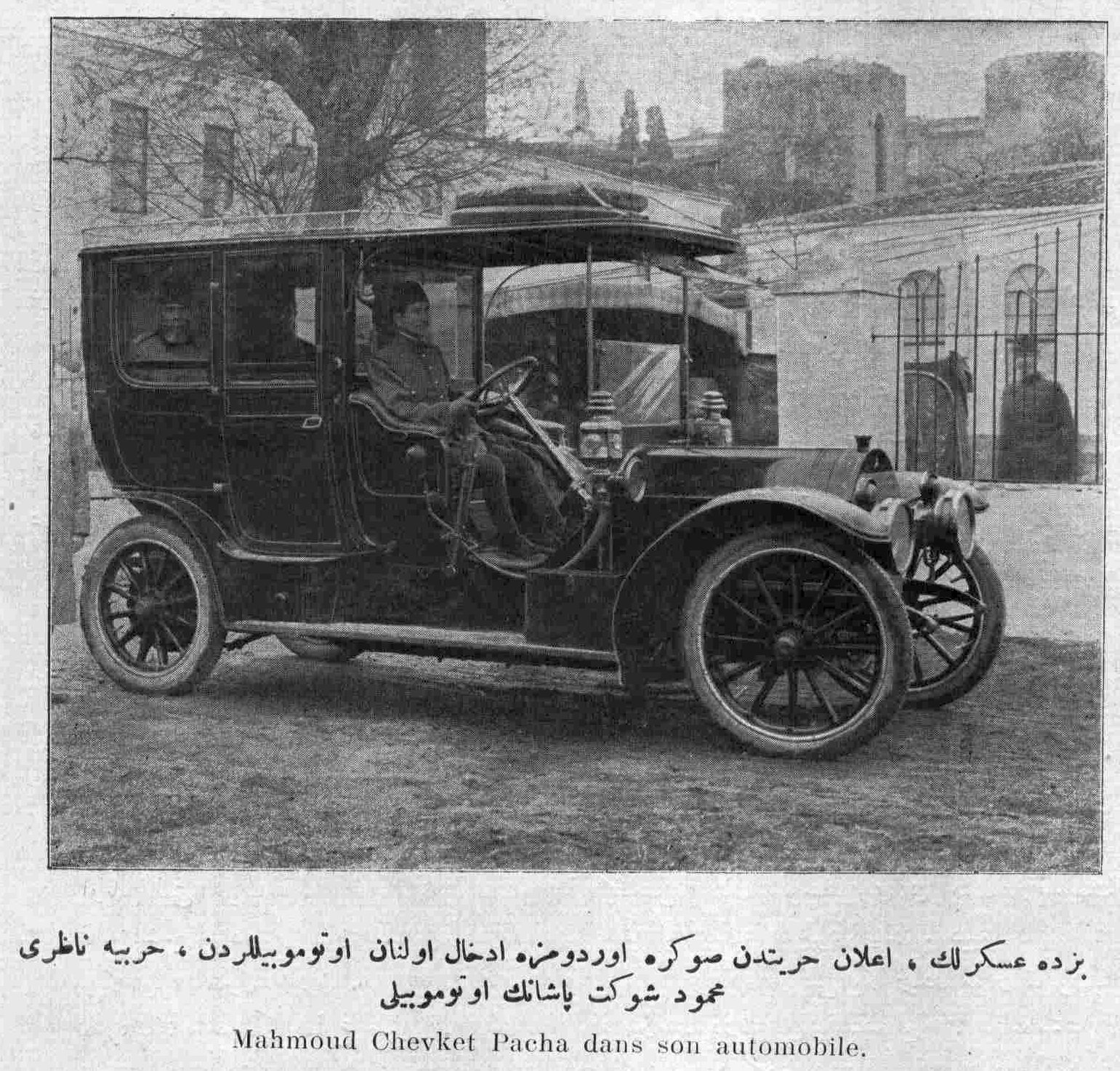
Mahmut Şevket Pasha and his car in the May 26, 1911 issue of Servet-i Funun magazine.

The historical importance of the Gräf & Stift Double Phaeton (Bois de Boulogne model) goes beyond the Sarajevo assassination. It is one of the few vehicles that were present during two of the most pivotal killings of the 20th century. The Phaeton was present during the assassination of Archduke Franz Ferdinand's assassination on June 28, 1914. Just a year and 17 days earlier, on June 11, 1913, another remarkable assassination took place. An assassination, that if seen in isolation would not have great historical importance, triggered events that would radically change the structure of the government of the Ottoman Empire. An assassination that in combination with the serbian assassination of the Archduke would trigger the collapse of the Austrian-Hungarian Empire. This Gräf and Stift Phaeton vehicle was present during the assassination of the Ottoman Grand Vizier and Minister of War, Mahmud Shevket Pasha, during the Pasha in Beyazıt square in Istanbul. The fact that a rare and luxurious vehicle was involved in two separate assassinations that were historically significant is one of the most remarkable statistical anomalies of the pre-war era.

=== Technical identification and configuration ===
Technical investigations on the vehicle, now on display at the Istanbul Military Museum, indicate that although it carries a Laffly logo, this only refers to the French company that converted it into an armoured vehicle (Constructeur). Research shows that the car was probably an Austro, Daimler 28/32 'Kaiserwagen' model, having a Viennese chassis and a German Daimler engine, which is another indication of the intertwined nature of Austrian automotive engineering in the Istanbul and Sarajevo assassinations.

== Between the wars ==
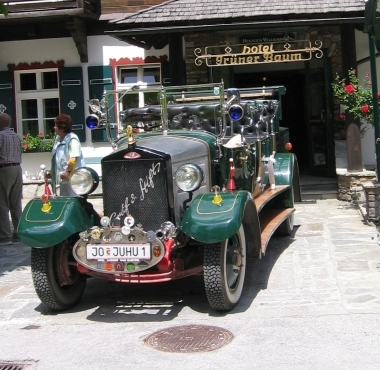
1928 Gräf & Stift

As the war broke out, Gräf & Stift started manufacturing trucks in order to meet wartime demand, which, together with buses and special vehicles, became the company's main business and enabled it to flourish in a rather difficult time. Manufacturing of passenger cars was resumed only in 1920, with a 2-litre intermediate-size model, Typ VK. The VK remained in production until 1928 (since 1926 as the modernized VK 2), but already in 1921 Gräf & Stift returned to making luxury cars, with a range of large six-cylinder models available through the 1920s and early 1930s. In 1930, the company presented its first eight-cylinder car, the sumptuous Typ Sp 8, in 1937 superseded by the Sp 9.

To boost sales, and therefore profits, Gräf & Stift also launched smaller models, badged G 35, G 36 and G 8, powered by a 4.6-litre eight-cylinder engine. To cater to the economy car segment of the market, the company entered an agreement with Citroën, assembling one of the French automaker's models as the MF 6 in 1935-36 (it had a 2.65-litre six-cylinder engine, with Gräf & Stift having had ceased the manufacturing of their own six-cylinders in 1935). Later, a joint-venture was started with Ford of Cologne, which provided for eight-cylinder Ford-licensed vehicles, badged Gräf-Ford V8, to be assembled by Gräf & Stift.

Neither of those ventures proved successful enough to assure the profitability of the passenger car business of Gräf & Stift, so the company decided to pull out of it. Its last own model was the rather modern C 12, fitted with a new twelve-cylinder engine, which was only made in very limited numbers in 1938, when the company ceased automobile production to concentrate on truck and bus manufacturing.

== After World War II ==
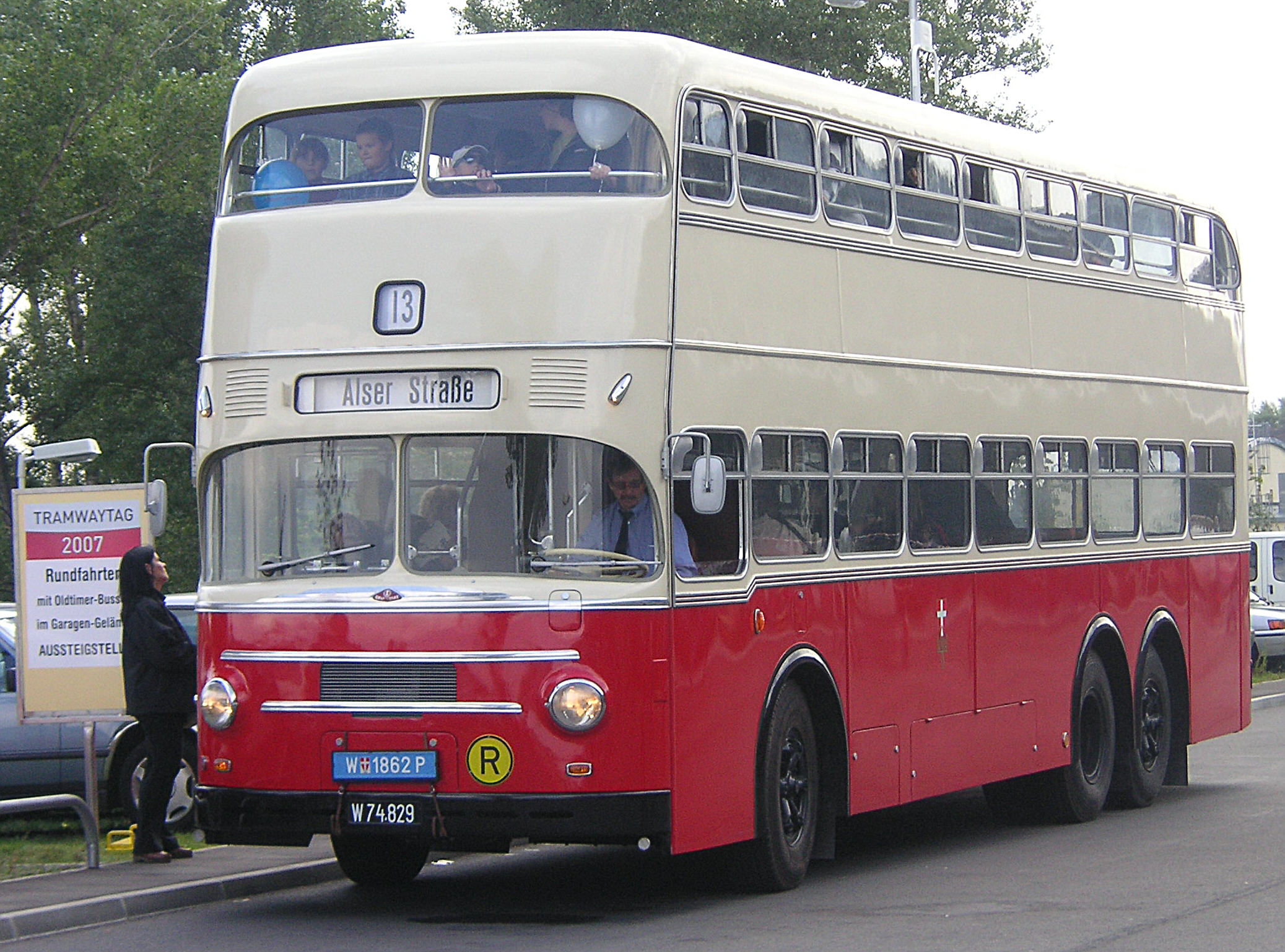
A Gräf & Stift double-decker bus in service in Vienna from 1961 until the mid-1970s (Details)

Gräf & Stift remained in the truck and bus manufacturing business after 1945, continuing as a family-owned enterprise, being run by members of the Gräf family. The company built its first trolleybuses in 1948. The company was merged with ÖAF in 1971.

== MAN subsidiary ==
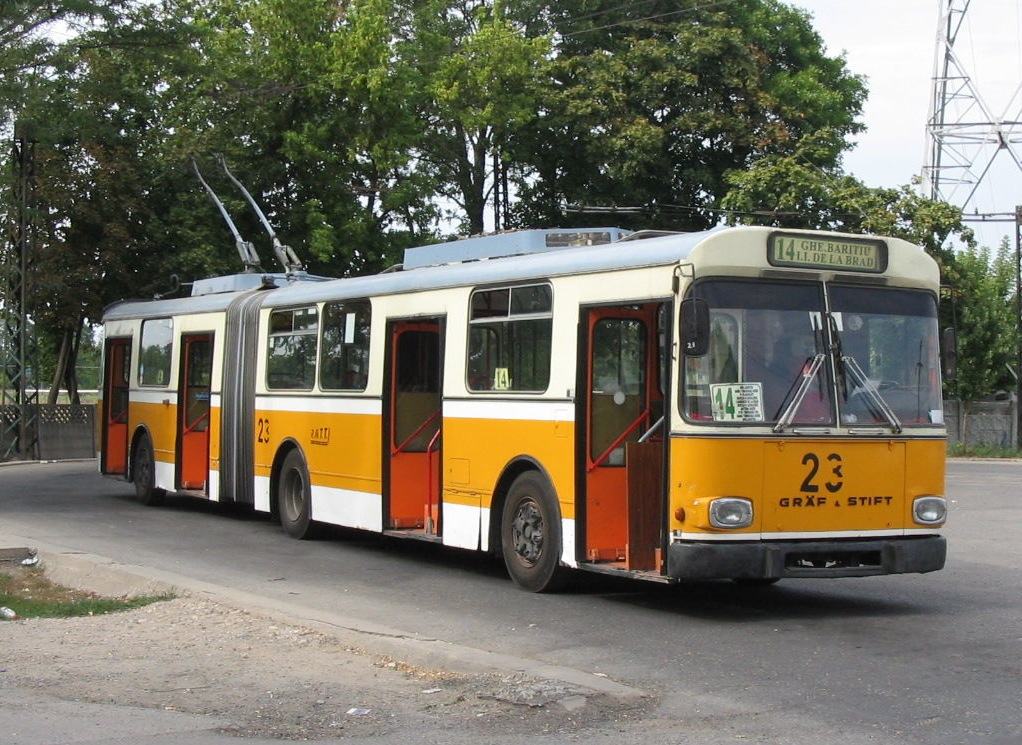
A 1980-built Gräf & Stift trolleybus in service in 2003 in Romania

In 1971 the company merged with Österreichische Automobil Fabriks-AG (ÖAF) to form ÖAF-Gräf & Stift AG, which in turn was taken over by MAN AG the same year. ÖAF-Gräf & Stift AG continued manufacturing under that name, as a subsidiary of MAN. Still based in Vienna, it was focused on supplying trucks and buses for the Austrian market, mostly based on MAN designs, and additionally specialised in trolleybuses. It was MAN's main trolleybus producer in the 1980s and 1990s, and these were sold under the Gräf & Stift name, with trolleybuses being supplied to several European cities, including Salzburg, Solingen and Bergen (Norway), among others. The company built its first low-floor trolleybuses in 1992, ten vehicles for Innsbruck.

As of 31 December 2000, ÖAF-Gräf & Stift AG had 897 employees, and its sales for the six-month period from 1 July 2000 to 31 December 2000 (the company's "Short Fiscal Year 2000") totalled €111 million.

Use of the longstanding Gräf & Stift name ended in 2001, when MAN renamed the company MAN Sonderfahrzeuge AG, as part of reorganizations following its June 2001 acquisition of Neoplan. This in turn became MAN Nutzfahrzeuge Österreich AG in 2004. In that year, MAN built a new plant on Gräf & Stift's original site in the Liesing district of Vienna and continues to be the biggest employer in the area.
