= Harry Slash & The Slashtones =

American musical group

- Origin: New York City
- Genres: Heavy metal Satire; Hard rock
- Years active: 1993–present
- Label: Various
- Members: Harry Slash; Arno Hecht; Even Steven Levee; Thom Jack; Steve "Budgie" Werner; Lez Warner
- Past members: Lisa Anselmo; Steve Bondy; Chris Carter; Scott DeBoys; Butch Garcia; Chuck Hancock; Felix Hanemann; Mark Hitt; Roderick Kohn; Michael Lawler; Mickey Leigh; Tony Moore; Rawn Randell; Brad Rosen; Richie Scarlet; Paul Sheehan; Amy Wagman
- Website: http://www.slashtones.com

Harry Slash & The Slashtones (also known as "The Slashtones") are an American musical group, formed in 1993 by New York native Harry Slash under the name "Harry & The Slashtones". Harry would later change the band's name many times, from "The Slashtones", to "Life?!","Not The Slashtones" and then to "Harry Slash & The Slashtones" during the era that Harry Slash produced music for Extreme Championship Wrestling. Their best known songs are the ECW theme ("This Is Extreme!"), Taz's theme ("Survive! (If I Let You)") and Sabu's theme ("Huka Blues"). After Extreme Championship Wrestling went bankrupt in 2001, Harry Slash continued to record and perform with the band after changing its name back to "The Slashtones". After several years of inactivity the band’s name was changed back to Harry Slash & The Slashtones in 2023 when they began recording again. The name of the band is a parody of Béla Fleck and the Flecktones, itself a play on Dick Dale and the Del-Tones.

== Band members ==
=== Current band ===
- Harry Slash: Vocals, Slide Guitar & Dulcimer. 1993–present
- Arno Hecht: Saxophone, Clarinet & Recorder. 1994–present
- Even Steven Levee: Bass. 1993 - 1995, 1997-1998, 2008, 2013–present
- Lez Warner: Drums. 1994, 1995-1997, 2023–present.
- Steve "Budgie" Werner: Drums and Cowbell. 1997–present.
- Thom Jack: Guitar. 2023-present

=== Honorary band members ===
- Gregg Gerson: Flute. 1995–2006
- Frank Fortune (RIP): Vocals. 1998-2008
- Joe Lynn Turner: Vocals. 1994–2006

=== Former band members ===
- Lisa Anselmo: Vocals. 1994, 1996
- Steve Bondy: Guitar. 1993-1998
- Chris Carter: Guitar. 1995
- Scott DeBoys: Drums. 1995-1996
- Butch Garcia: Harmonica. 1994
- Chuck Hancock (a/k/a "Raven"): Saxophone. 1994-1995
- Felix Hanemann: Bass & Keyboards. 2006-2013
- Mark Hitt: Lead & Rhythm Guitar. 2006-2008
- Roderick Kohn: Guitar. 1993, 1994-1999, 2000-2006
- Michael Lawler: 6 & 12-string Guitars. 1994-1995, 2013–2019
- Mickey Leigh: Guitar. 1999-2001, 2008
- Tony Moore: Bass & Vocals. 1995-1997, 2000, 2002-2008
- Rawn Randell: Bass. 2001
- Brad Rosen Esq.: Harmonica. 1993-1994
- Richie Scarlet: Lead & Rhythm Guitar. 2009-2013
- Paul Sheehan: Drums. 1993-1995
- Amy Wagman: Vocals. 1994

=== Others ===
- The Slashtones have also recorded with:

- Andy Abbene: Guitar. 1997 (Soulcrush)
- Ross Byron: Guitar. 2023-2024 (Ross Byron’s Fandango)
- Marianne DeAngelis: Harmonica. 2008
- Artie Dillon: Guitar. 2008
- Frank Fortune: Vocals. 1998 - 2008 (Reckless Fortune)
- Joey Fortune: Guitar. 2005 - 2008 (Reckless Fortune)
- Francine Fournier: Vocals. 1997. (ECW Wrestler)
- Mac Gollehon: Trumpet & Trumbone. 2006 - 2008 (Miles Davis Band)
- Taso Karras: Drums, Bouzouki, Baglama & Percussion. 2008, 2013–2015
- Mike Lewis: Trumpet. 2005 (Buddy Rich Band)
- Charlie Sabin: Vocals. 2008 (Barfly, Toxik)
- Frank Sannutto: Drums. 1999 (Reckless Fortune)
- Ritchie Scarlet: Guitar & Bass. 1997 (Ace Frehley Band, Mountain)
- Garry Sullivan: Drums. 1998 (The B-52's)
- Tazz: Vocals. 1998 (ECW Wrestler)

== Discography ==
- Episode One (EP), The Slashtones, Studio D (Out Of Print), 1995
- ECW: Extreme Music, Various Artists, Concrete/Slab, 1998
- Freedom Of Speech (EP), Harry Slash & The Slashtones, MP3.com (Out Of Print), 2000
- Fire Woman, A Tribute to The Cult, Various Artists, Versaille, 2000
- "PAIN" (Movie Soundtrack), The Slashtones and Die Nicht, Endstop (Out Of Print.), 2003
- Just Like Paradise, A Millennium Tribute to David Lee Roth, Various Artists, Versaille, 2005
- It's So Easy, A Millennium Tribute to Guns N' Roses, Various Artists, Versaille, 2006
- Three Lock Box, A Millennium Tribute to Sammy Hagar, Various Artists, Versaille, 2006
- Panama, A Millennium Tribute to Van Halen, Various Artists, Versaille, 2006
- Too Fast For Love, A Millennium Tribute to Mötley Crüe, Various Artists, Versaille, 2007
- Lick It Up, A Millennium Tribute to KISS, Various Artists, Versaille, 2008
- Double Talkin' Jive, A Hard Rock Tribute to Guns N' Roses, Various Artists, Versaille, 2008
- Misty Mountain Hop, A Millennium Tribute to Led Zeppelin, Various Artists, Versaille, 2008
- Good King Wenceslas (streaming single), Harry Slash & The Slashtones, i-potato, 2024
- God Rest Ye Merry, Gentlemen (streaming single), Harry Slash & The Slashtones, i-potato, 2025
- In The Bleak Midwinter (streaming single), Harry Slash & The Slashtones, i-potato, 2025
- Music From Movies That Don’t Exist Yet, Harry Slash & The Slashtones, Grievous World Music, 2026
