= Even Steven Levee =

American musician (born 1951)

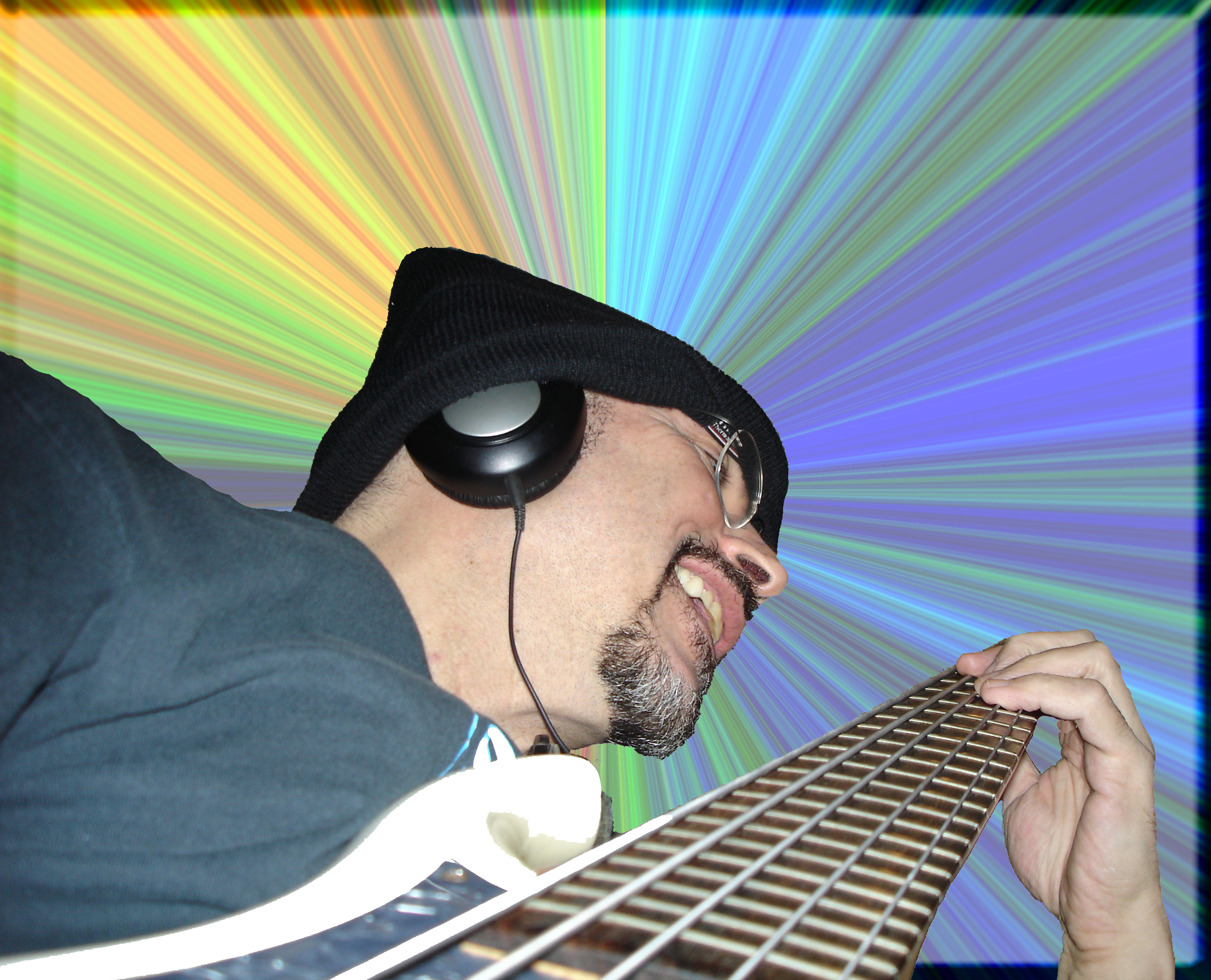

Background information
- Born: Steven Louis Levee; 1951 (age 74–75); Crown Heights, New York, United States
- Genres: Hard rock Blues; Jazz; Hip hop
- Occupations: Musician, producer, IT professional
- Instrument: Bass
- Years active: 1964–present
- Label: i-Potato Music
- Website: http://BassMasterGeneral.com

Even Steven Levee (born Steven Louis Levee, 1951) is an American musician, bass player, recording engineer, record producer and former nightclub concert promoter. He is best known for his work the bands Lifeforce, ZRS, Brad Factor:10, The Slashtones, and the Freak Parade; and his production work with Hedi, Barbara Lee George, MC Magic D, and Gun Hill.

== Early life ==
Levee was born in Crown Heights, New York, United States. He attended Miami Dade Junior College in Florida as an art major while also playing bass in various local bands. His early musical influences of the Yardbirds, the Beatles, Jimi Hendrix, and Led Zeppelin made his approach to music raw and loud.

== Lifeforce / Lifesource ==
After college, Levee and future record producer, Frank Filippetti, formed the band Life Force in 1972. Life Force's blend of rock, jazz, classical and fusion led to a deal with Paramount Records. However, the label folded before their debut album could be released. One of their songs, "Holy Moses", was released in 1974 on Streaker Records as a single, but was wrongly credited to "Force".

Life Force disbanded in 1974, but Levee and some of the other members changed their sound and formed the band Life Source. The group hit the road touring the US and Canada for the next two years with their new "Top 40s" sound.

After Life Source disbanded, Levee toured for the following three years with the Profile Band, an R&B dance band based out of Cincinnati, Ohio.

== Brad Factor:10 ==
Levee returned to New York and co-founded Brad Factor:10 (aka "The Yuppies From Hell") in 1987. The band's stage persona was "The worlds first Yuppie Heavy-Metal Band", and their music reflected that. They developed a strong "cult" following performing at major rock venues like L'Amour's, Nirvana, the Cat Club, Limelight, Black Cat, and the Chance. In 1988, Brad Factor:10 competed and won the "New York City Rock Wars" contest, beating out Beggars and Thieves, Skin and Bones, the Throbbs, and Please (later known as Trouble Tribe). Brad Factor:10 performed with such bands as the Tubes, Enuffz N Nuff, D' Priest, the Stuttering John Band, Circus of Power, Sophia Ramos, Cycle Sluts From Hell, Electric Angels, Pleasure Bombs, Warrior Soul, Heads Up, and Raging Slab.

== Jam sessions ==
Beginning in 1989, Levee hosted jam sessions at many of New York City's best known rock clubs like Spodee O Dee's, Limelight, Danceteria, Space At Chase, Lion's Den, and Boom. These jams included musicians such as Jason Bonham, Chip Z. Nuff, Adam Bomb, Lez Warner, Ryan Roxi, Joe Lynn Turner, Mark O'Conner, LSD, Mark Wood, members of Motörhead, Jon Paris, Andy Bigan, Terry Brock, Ed Terry, Anthony Michael Hall, Herbie Trabino, Roderick Kohn, Martha Velez, Delmar Brown, Lenny Kravits, Steve Farrone, Anton Fig, Bobby Chouinard, Barry Finnerty, Jon Hammond, Paul Sheehan, and Grant Green Jr.

== The Slashtones ==
In 1993, Levee was one of the original members of the band that would become known as Harry Slash & The Slashtones, later best known for their original works heard on the Extreme Championship Wrestling television programs from 1997 to 2008. Levee remained part of the band's rotating live lineup and subsequent style changes that would include current and former members of Raging Slab, Murphy's Law, the Uptown Horns, Zebra, Riot, the John Entwistle Band, and Frehley's Comet. Levee performed live with the Slashtones until 1995, when his need for back surgery forced him to step down from the group for a time. He returned to the stage with them in 1997 and once more in 1998.

Levee remained a fixture in the Slashtones' rotating studio recording cast. He appeared on the band's 1995 limited release EP Episode One and on several tracks heard on the ECW television programs, including the theme music for Ravishing" Rick Rude, SuperCrazy, and Francine.

Levee made a return to the band's extended studio family in 2008, playing the five-string fretless bass on the band's rendition of "Friends", released on the compilation CD tribute to Led Zeppelin, Misty Mountain Hop.

== Rattlesnake Guitar ==
In 1995, Viceroy Music's president, Arnie Goodman invited Levee to perform on the Peter Green tribute CD, Rattlesnake Guitar. Levee put together the band of himself, guitarist Ray Gomez from the Stanley Clarke Band and drummer Bobby Chouinard, formerly of Billy Squier. They recorded two songs, "Evil Woman Blues" and "Lazy Poker Blues", with vocalists Pete McMahon and Troy Turner. Rattlesnake Guitar also included musicians from Pink Floyd, the Yardbirds, Jeff Beck Group, the Animals, Jethro Tull, Savoy Brown, David Lee Roth, and the Uptown Horns. Levee's work also appears on Peter Green Song Book available via import and This Is The Blues - Volume 1 and 4 released in 2010 on Eagle Records (Fontana). This Is The Blues features performances by Jeff Beck, Jack Bruce, Savoy Brown, Mick Jagger, and Rory Gallager.

== Freak Parade ==
From 1999 to 2002, Levee was the bass player for the band Freak Parade, featuring two original founding members of Utopia, keyboardist Moogy Klingman and drummer Kevin Ellman. The band recorded and released a studio CD titled Here Comes The and several live CDs.

== Currently ==
Levee continued to play bass with Joy Ryder and Rhythm Club TV (until Ryder's death), Barbara Lee George, the 253 Boys, the recent reformation of Brad Factor:10, Buzzy Linhart, hip-hop artist TRP, and his studio band AFU GoodFriends, as well as writing, producing, recording music and voice-overs.

As co-owner of i~Potato Music, Levee is producing new hip-hop, folk, and RnB artists with partner Arthur Steuer, including MC Magic D, Gun Hill, AFU GoodFriends, Voice of The People with Joe Butler (Lovin' Spoonful) and i-Potato - The Adventures of Lumpy and Homefry.

Levee has also produced, engineered and played bass with singer songwriter Barbara Lee George whose CD Protected By Love was released in 2011. Levee placed George's song "To Young To Die" in a 10-hour Vietnam War special scheduled to air on History Channel in November 2011.

Levee produced, engineered, played bass and co wrote the music with Don Puglisi on "The Curse", a poem by Florence Kaye. "The Curse" also appears on Don Puglisi's release Goodbye New York. In addition, Puglisi and his song "Stoned on the Range" are included on Goodbye New York, and both appear in the major motion picture Taking Woodstock. Don Puglisi is also performing with punk rockers the 253 Boys.

== Personal life ==
Bill Grainer is a cousin of Levee's.
