= Age-Friendly University Global Network =

Consortium of higher education institutions

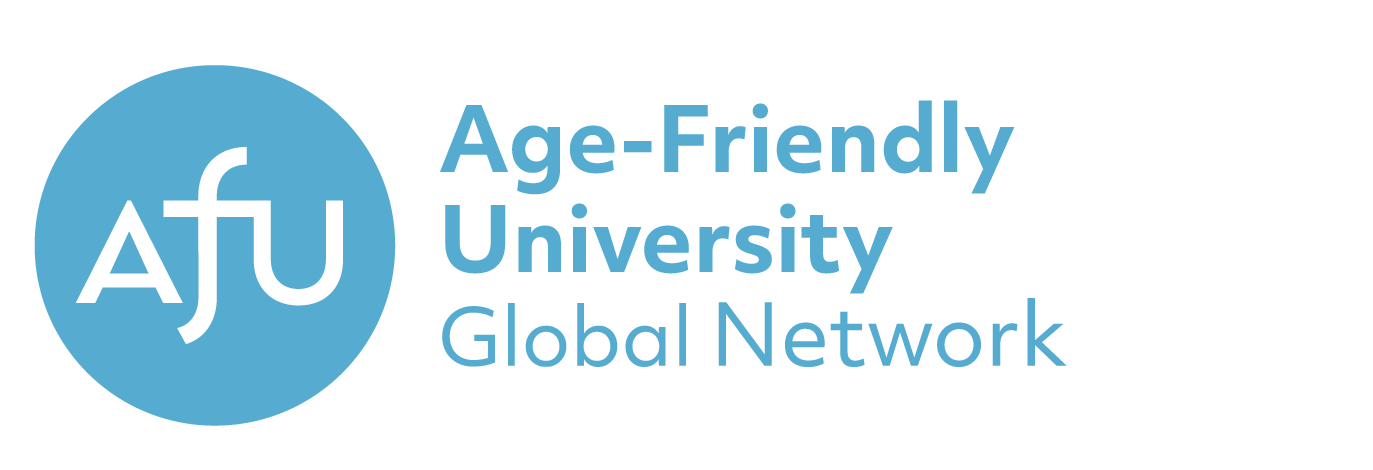
- Formation: January 2012
- Headquarters: Arizona State University
- Location: Phoenix, AZ, United States
- Members: 1560
- Chair of the Secretariat: M. Aaron Guest
- Website: www.AFUGN.org

The Age-Friendly University Global Network is an international consortium of higher education institutions that aim to increase the engagement of individuals across the lifespan and have adopted the Ten Principles of the Age-Friendly University.

== Background ==
The Age-Friendly University (AFU) Global Network is an international consortium of institutions of higher education based at Arizona State University, dedicated to addressing the opportunities and challenges of an aging population. Established in 2012, the network is rooted in the Ten Principles of an Age-Friendly University, whose development was led by Dublin City University in Ireland in collaboration with a global group of academic and community leaders. The principles serve as a framework for guiding universities in becoming more inclusive of older adults in their educational offerings, research agendas, and community engagement initiatives.

The AFU Global Network aims to recognizes the role of universities as contributors to the lifelong learning movement and emphasizes the importance of intergenerational learning, workforce development, and research that addresses the needs of aging populations. Member institutions commit to fostering age-friendly practices across three primary areas: teaching and learning, research and innovation, and civic engagement. Since launching in 2012, the network has expanded with member universities spanning multiple continents.

The AFU Global Network aims to transform higher education to better serve individuals of all ages, particularly as societies worldwide experience demographic shifts toward older populations. Its initiatives support creating inclusive campuses that promote lifelong engagement and advance the broader societal goal of age inclusivity.

=== Pre-formation ===
The Age-Friendly University Global Network is organized around the Ten Principles of an Age-Friendly University. These Ten Principles were developed following the model of the World Health Organization's Age-Friendly Communities Program.

The World Health Organization (WHO) launched the Age-Friendly Cities Initiative in 2006 to address the needs of rapidly aging populations and to create environments that promote healthy and active aging. The initiative focuses on improving the physical, social, and economic aspects of urban environments to enhance the quality of life for older adults. Guided by the principles of the Global Age-Friendly Cities: A Guide, the initiative identified eight domains of livability, including housing, transportation, social participation, and health services, which are essential for fostering age-friendly communities.

Recognizing the contributions that institutes of higher education could have to enhancing these efforts, and the engagement of institutes of higher education in the development of the original Age-Friendly Cities Criteria, a workgroup convened to identify the contributions institutions of higher education could have to creating a more age-friendly world.

=== Formation ===
Recognizing the potential for broader engagement, Dublin City University, the University of Strathclyde, and Arizona State University formed the Age-Friendly University Global Network to coordinate their efforts. At this time, they also opened up endorsement of the Ten Principles to other institutions of higher education. In 2017, the Academy for Gerontology in Higher Education endorsed the Ten Principles of an Age-Friendly University for their members.

An institution of higher education who endorses the Ten Principles of an Age-Friendly University receives the designation of an 'Age-Friendly University' or an AFU.

== Organizational structure ==
The Age-Friendly University Global Network is governed by a permanent Secretariat, which is housed at Arizona State University. The Secretariat reports to an Executive Council made up of a Vice-Chair, appointed members, and representatives from each of the Regional Leads.

The Secretariat governs the operations and management of the Age-Friendly University Global Network. This includes managing the endorsement process for institutes of higher education who wish to join the network or serve as an observer. Prior to 2023, the Age-Friendly Global Network was based at Dublin City University. Dublin City University served as the home of the Global Network from 2014 to 2023. Regional Leads serve as the representative of their region, generally a continent, to the Age-Friendly University Global Network Executive Council. In addition, the Regional Leads advise the Secretariat on matters related to their region

=== Geragogy ===
The Age-Friendly University Global Network works with other organizations focused on increasing access to opportunities for learners of all ages, such as the Osher Lifelong Learning Network and the Universities of the Third Age.

== Participation in the Age-Friendly Ecosystem model ==
=== The Age-Friendly Ecosystem ===
The age-friendly ecosystem refers to a comprehensive and collaborative framework that integrates various sectors, organizations, and initiatives to support the needs of aging populations. Rooted in principles outlined by the World Health Organization (WHO), the ecosystem encompasses unique areas such as Cities and Communities, Public Health, Health Systems, and Workplaces, and Institutes of Higher Education. The ecosystem promotes the development of environments that enable older adults to live healthy, active, and independent lives. Each of the components of the ecosystem address specific aspects of aging. By fostering partnerships among governments, academic institutions, nonprofits, businesses, and local communities, the ecosystem works to create inclusive and supportive environments for individuals across the lifespan.

==== Age-Friendly cities and communities ====
Age-Friendly Universities support Age-Friendly Cities and Communities by contributing resources and expertise to advance age-friendly initiatives. Through student engagement, AFUs provide assistance with community projects, including intergenerational programs, outreach activities, and urban planning efforts that align with age-friendly goals. Faculty and professionals from AFUs serve as mentors, offering guidance to stakeholders in developing and implementing strategies that promote inclusivity for older populations. AFUs contribute to the evaluation of age-friendly initiatives by conducting research and assessments to measure their effectiveness and ensure alignment with the World Health Organization’s age-friendly framework. These universities also play a role in workforce development by training students in areas such as gerontology, public health, healthcare, social work, and urban planning, equipping them with the skills needed to address aging societies.

==== Age-Friendly public health ====
Engagement between Age-Friendly Universities and Age-Friendly Public Health Systems facilitates collaboration to improve health outcomes and support the well-being of aging populations. This partnership enhances the development of evidence-based strategies to address aging-related challenges. AFUs contribute by conducting research on issues affecting older adults, offering specialized education and training for students and professionals, and supporting community-based initiatives aimed at improving health equity for aging populations. Age-Friendly Public Health initiatives provide practical applications for AFU research and education through collaboration on programs focused on areas such as chronic disease prevention, mental health, social isolation, and access to healthcare.

==== Age-Friendly health care ====
Engagement between Age-Friendly Universities and Age-Friendly Health Care initiatives supports the development of innovative strategies to address the health needs of aging populations. The 4M Model is a framework developed by the Institute for Healthcare Improvement (IHI) as part of the Age-Friendly Health Systems initiative to improve care for older adults. It focuses on four essential elements—What Matters, Medication, Mobility, and Mentation—to ensure that healthcare is tailored to the needs, preferences, and goals of older adults.

This collaboration integrates academic research, education, and training with practical applications in healthcare settings to enhance the delivery of age-friendly care. AFUs contribute by conducting research on aging-related health challenges, developing curricula focused on geriatrics and gerontology, and training healthcare professionals to provide patient-centered care tailored to older adults.
