= ÖAF =

Austrian automobile company

Österreichische Automobil-Fabrik
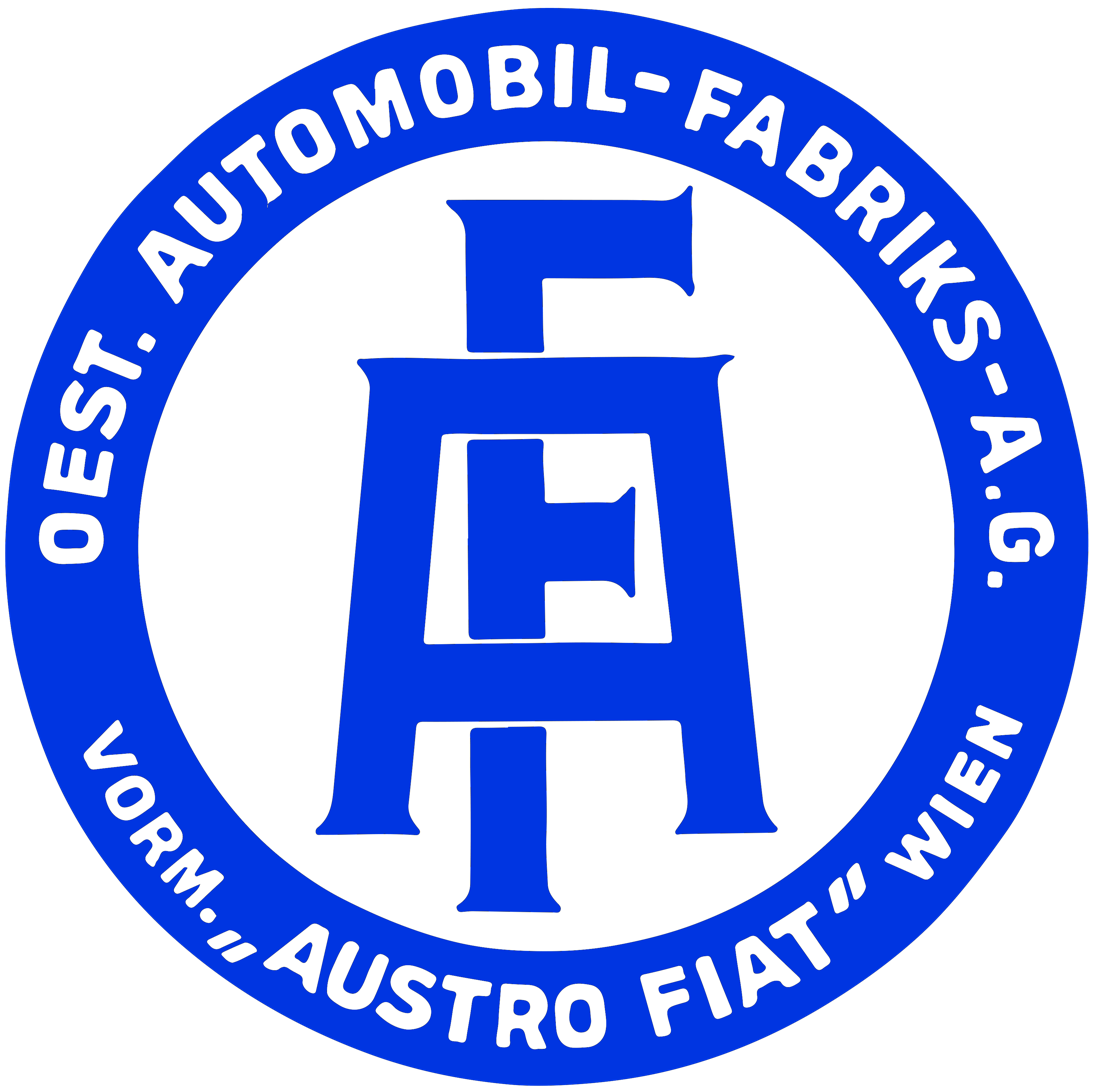

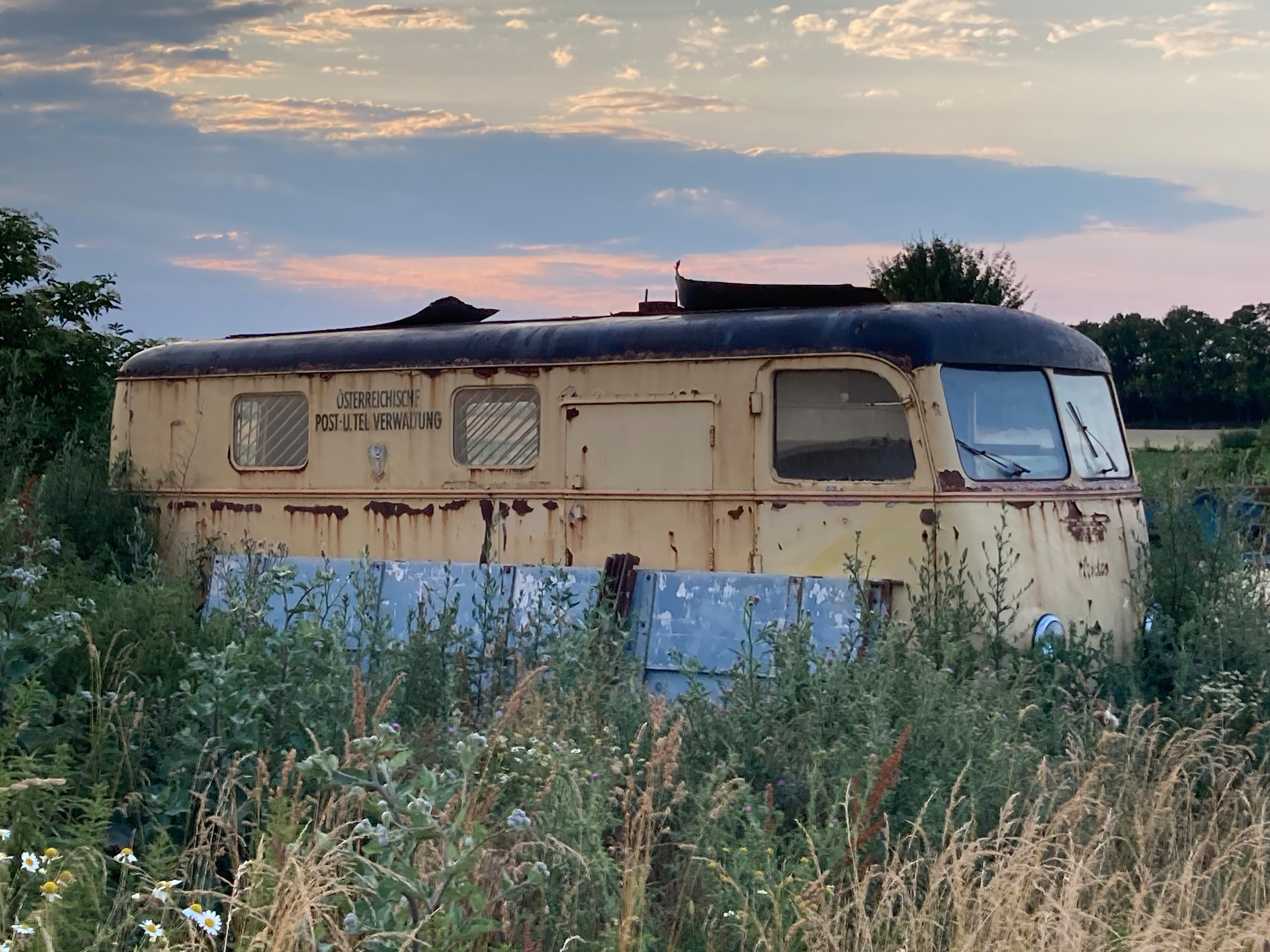
- Company type: Subsidiary of MAN SE
- Industry: Automotive
- Founded: 1907
- Headquarters: Floridsdorf (Vienna), Austria
- Products: vehicles
- Website: Official Website

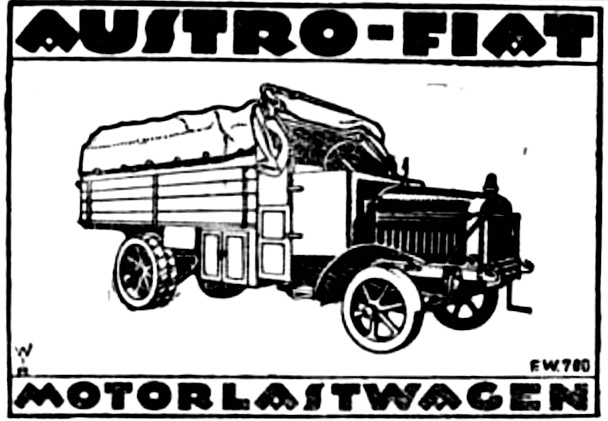
Austro-Fiat (1920)

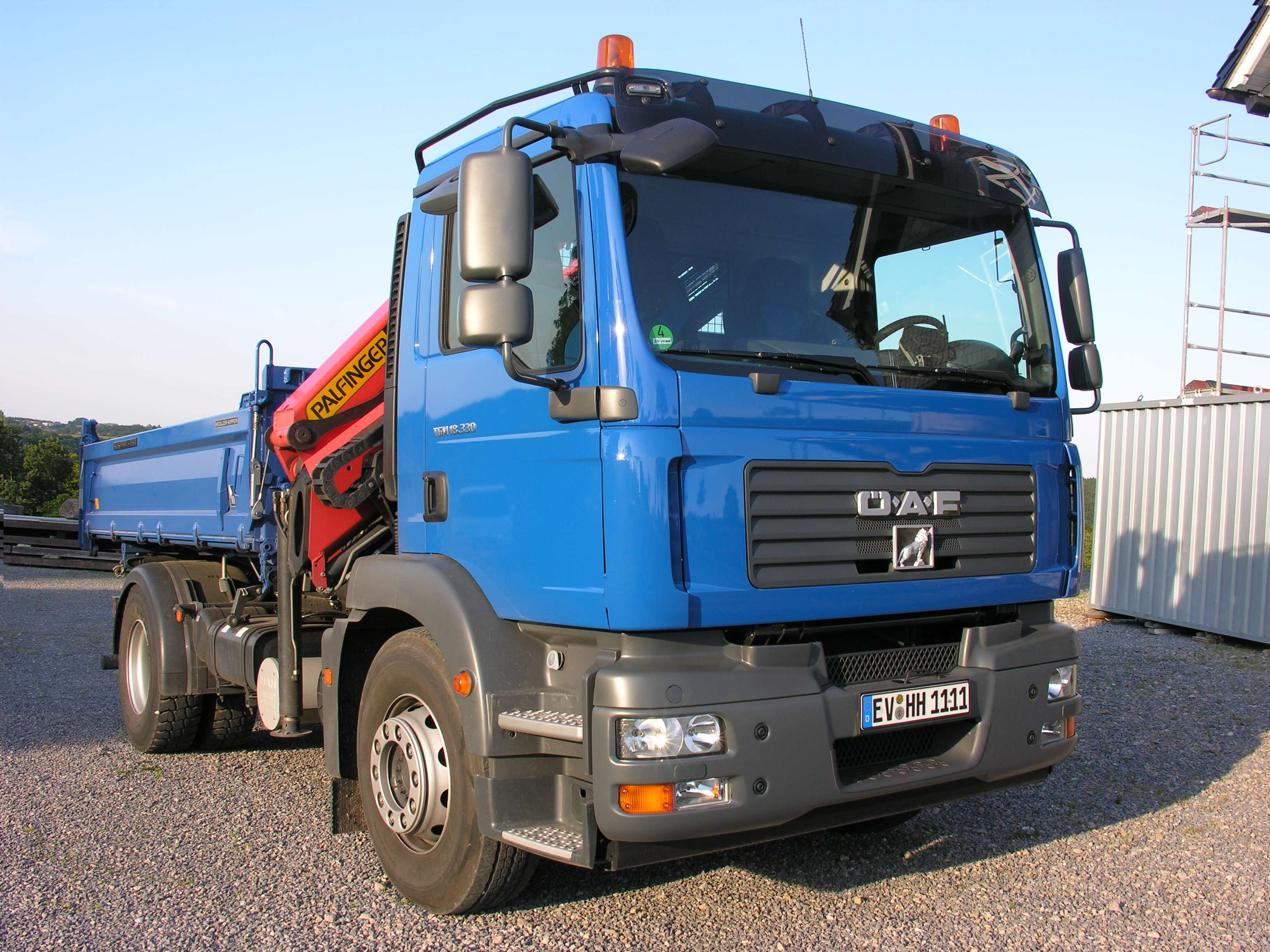
ÖAF automobil

ÖAF is an acronym for Österreichische Automobil-Fabrik (literally Austrian automobile factory), previously known as Österreichische Austro-Fiat, an Austrian (Austro-Hungarian) car and truck manufacturer that now is completely incorporated into MAN.

== Austro-Fiat ==
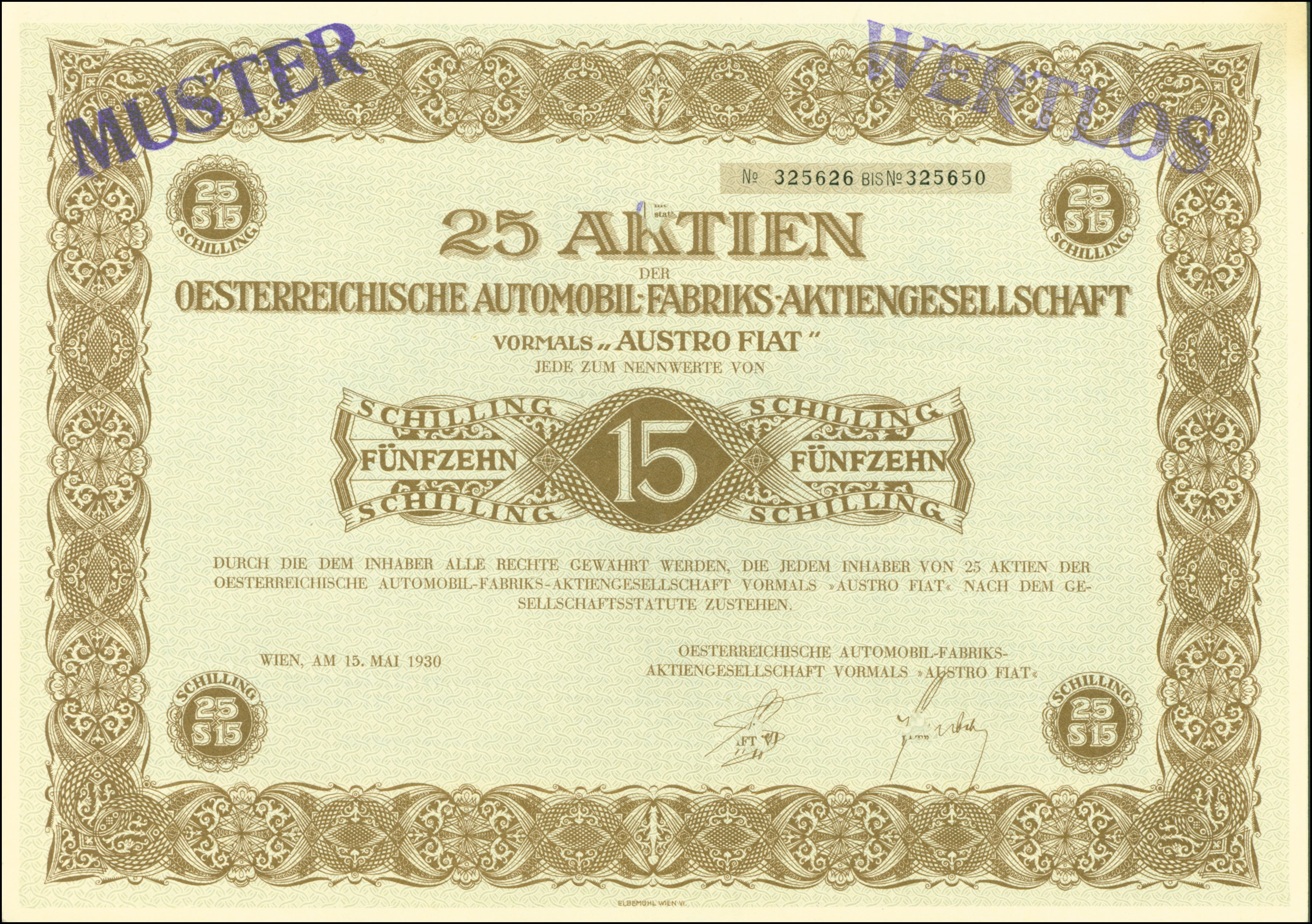
Share of the Oesterreichischen Automobil-Fabriks-AG, issued 15. May 1930

ÖAF was created by Fiat in 1907 and is now part of the German MAN group. The manufacture of automobiles began in the new plant built for the occasion in Vienna in 1908, while the number was only 50 employees. A truck of 4 tonnes, similar to the Italian Fiat model was manufactured from 1911. It was originally Austro-Fiat, which during the First World War began to develop their own products.

In 1925 the Austro-Fiat brand expired and the company became Österreichische Automobil Fabrik AG, under the abbreviation ÖAF, with preservation of the trademark filed earlier. Also in 1925, a separate company took over sales of Italian Fiat cars, and Austro-Fiat became affiliated with Austro-Daimler and Puch. The last private car, Type 1001A, was different from the earlier Type 1001, having 34 bhp (25 kW) engines and conventional rear axles.

The latest model Fiat's truck was TS 1924, equipped with a 45 hp (34 kW) Fiat engine. The company began production of other models in Austria, which has enabled the company to begin developing its own models. The most popular submitted in 1925 was the AFN light truck with 1.75 tons of payload. This truck used a 42 hp, 2850 cc 4 cylinder Fiat engine. It also used gimbals and pneumatic instead of solid tires, which allowed for a speed of 65 km/h. In 1928, the AF2 appeared and the following year a bus called the Austro-Fiat-1001. It is from this time that the company discontinued the manufacture of passenger cars to concentrate on commercial vehicles, trucks, vans and buses. This allowed the AFL/AFY to be manufactured from 1930 to 1937.

== MAN acquisition ==
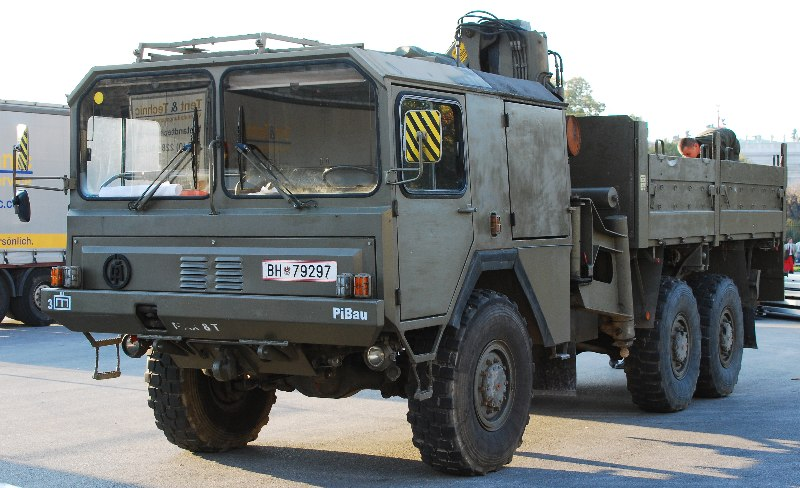
Austrian Army ÖAF-sLKW truck

In 1938, when Austria was annexed by the Third Reich, German MAN obtained the majority of shares owned by Fiat in ÖAF, reducing the Italian firm's share to 15%. ÖAF had begun equipping some of its trucks with diesel engines from MAN in 1934.

After the Second World War, the Floridsdorf factory was in the Russian zone and the plants were used for Russian reparations. In 1955, ÖAF was released from these payments and the factory began producing trucks again. They went to Austria to build military trucks but the Austrian army eventually selected rival Steyr for its famous Pinzgauer. Only 136 examples of ÖAF's challenger, the Husar, were built between 1967 and 1969. The ÖAF Tornado was a greater success becoming the best-selling truck in Austria.

In 1970, the company was privatized again; MAN then let it merge with Gräf & Stift, out of which ÖAF Gräf & Stift arose which in 1971 was fully taken over by MAN.

Beginning with the Moskvitch in 1958, ÖAF also acted as Austrian importers of many Russian-made automobiles, including the Lada and the GAZ Volga. In 1982 they also took over the Škoda agency, which they held until 1992 when new owners Volkswagen replaced them. In 1988 they began importing American Chrysler automobiles, but as of July 1993 the company sourced out automotive imports to a new company.

In 2001 MAN renamed the ÖAF Gräf & Stift company MAN Sonderfahrzeuge AG, as part of reorganizations following its June 2001 acquisition of Neoplan. In 2004 the company was renamed MAN Nutzfahrzeuge Österreich AG. All MAN vehicles in Austria could be ordered with an ÖAF-badged grille until 2008, when the ÖAF marque was finally abandoned. MAN continues to manufacture trucks at the former Liesing ÖAF site though, but the company is now named MAN Truck & Bus Österreich GesmbH and manufactures and sells all its products as MAN.

== Vehicles ==
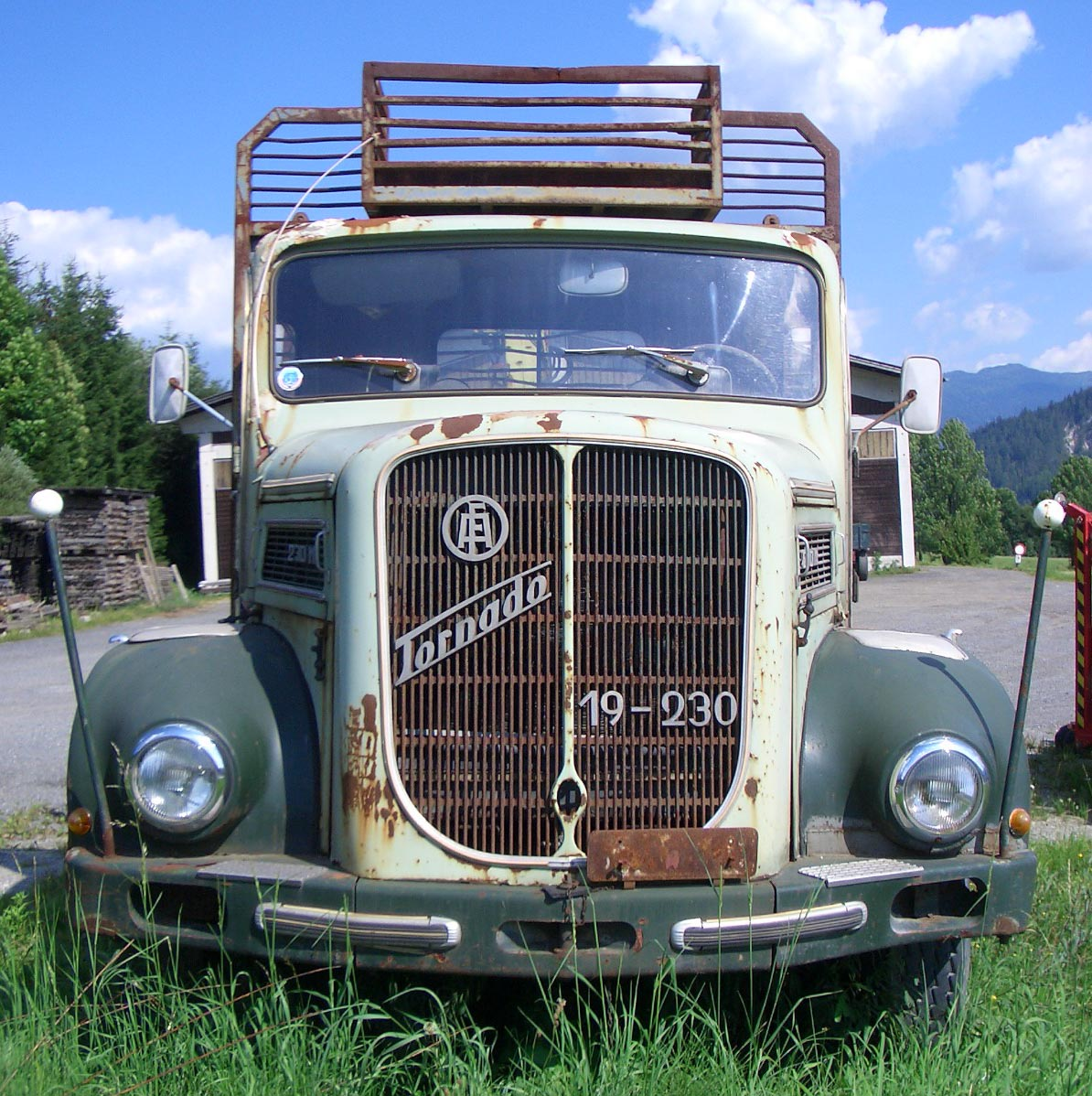
ÖAF Tornado 19-230

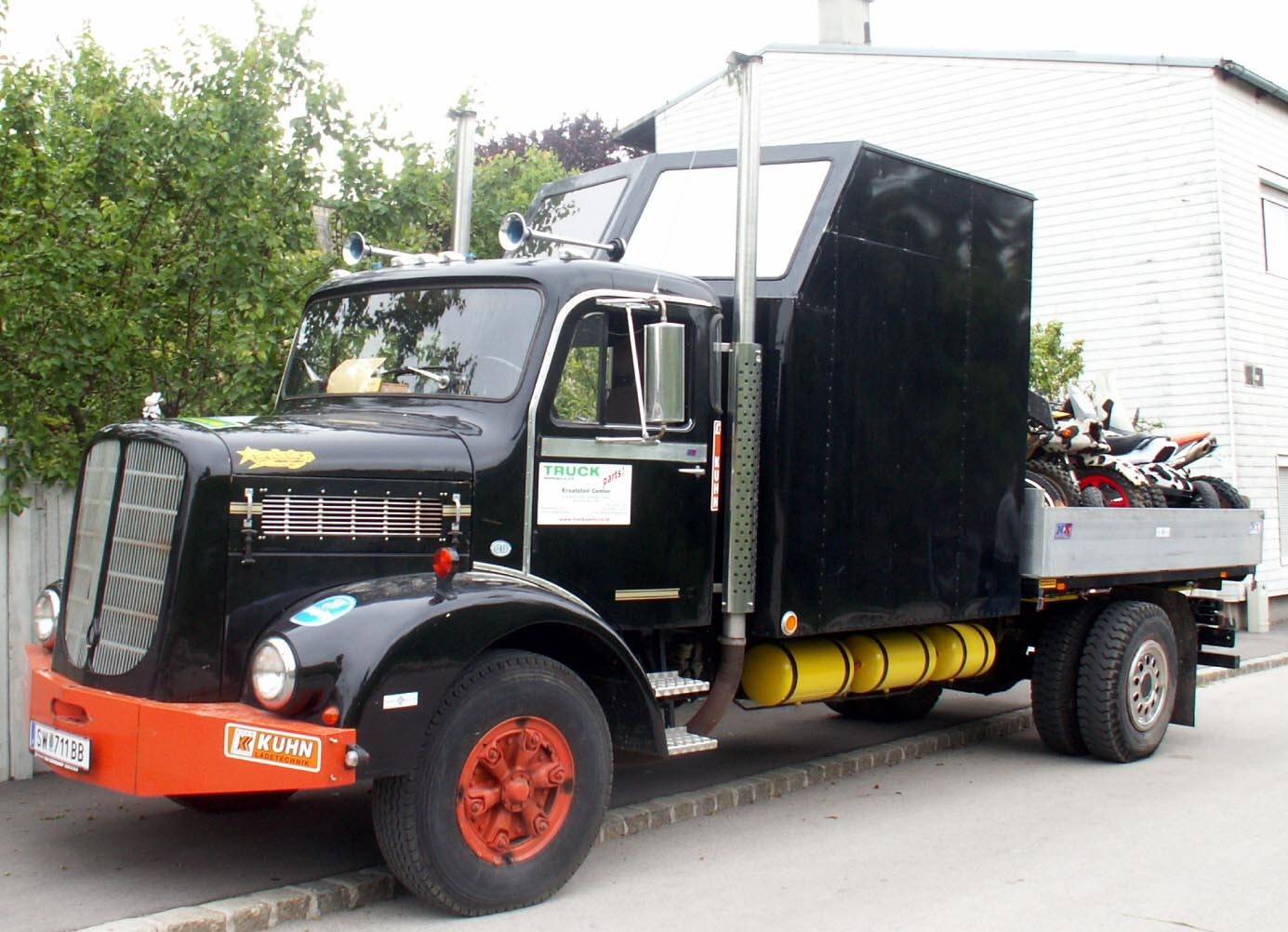
ÖAF Tornado 16–192 with Trilex-Felgen

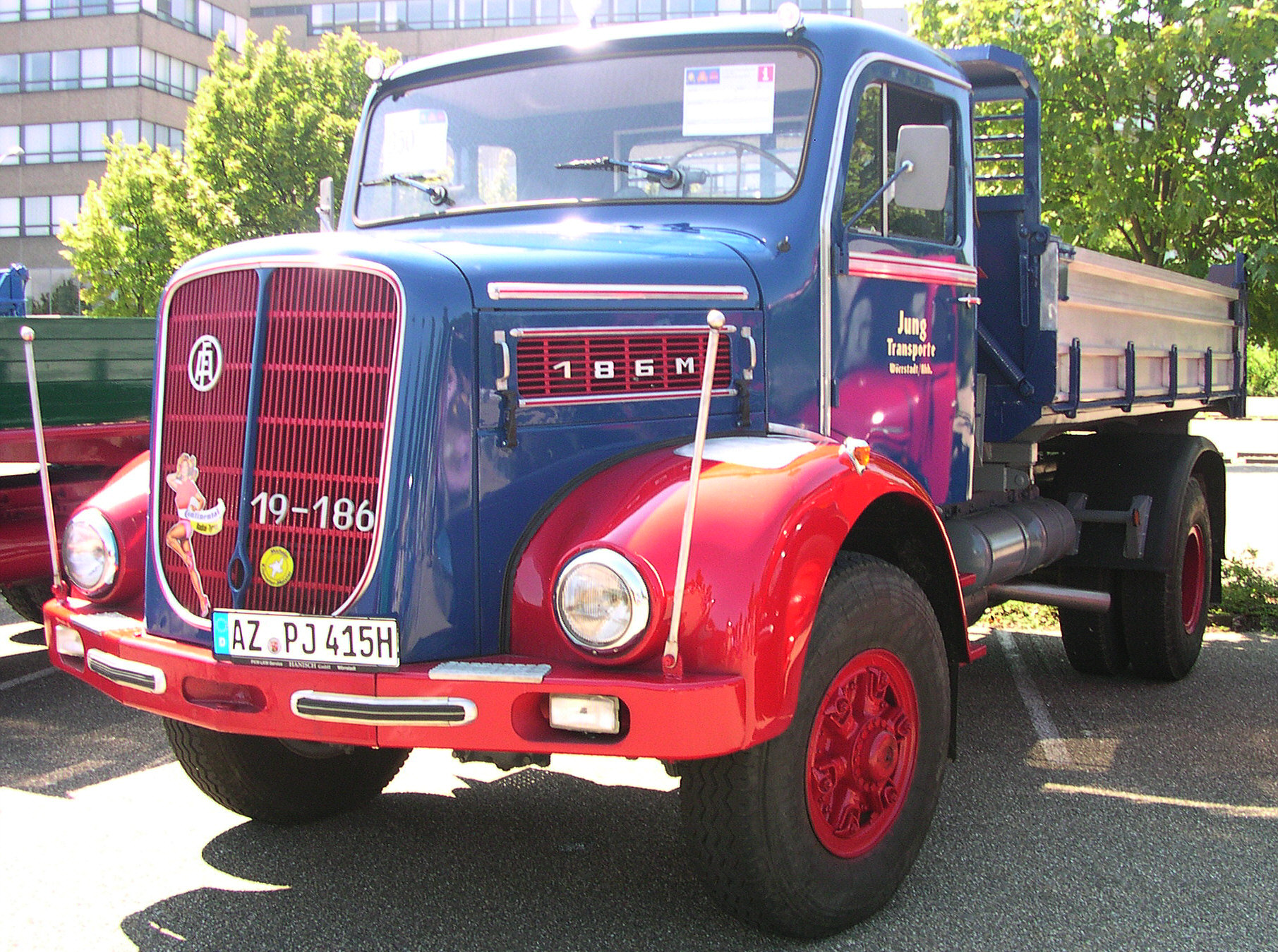
ÖAF Tornado 19–186

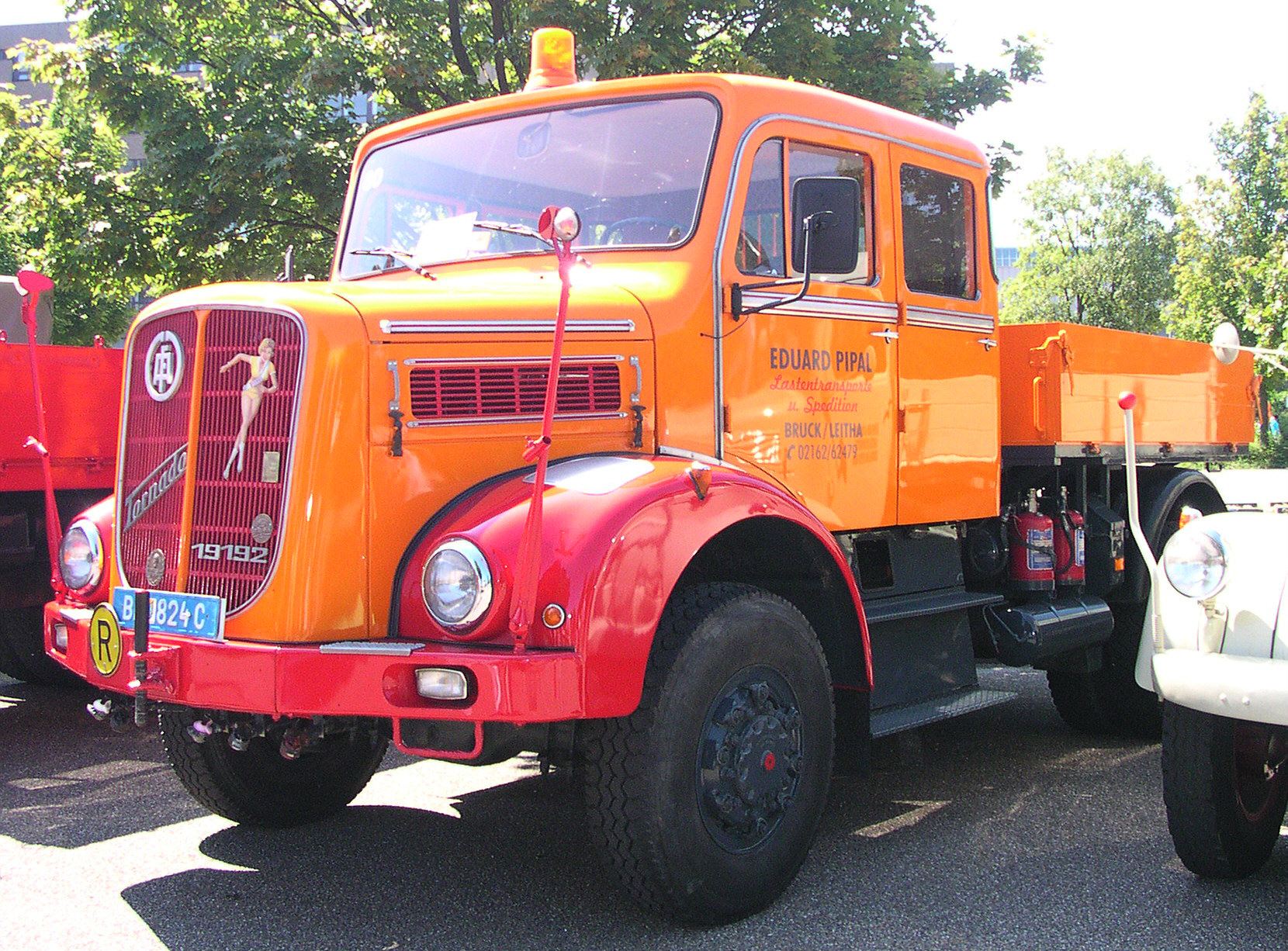
ÖAF Tornado 19–192

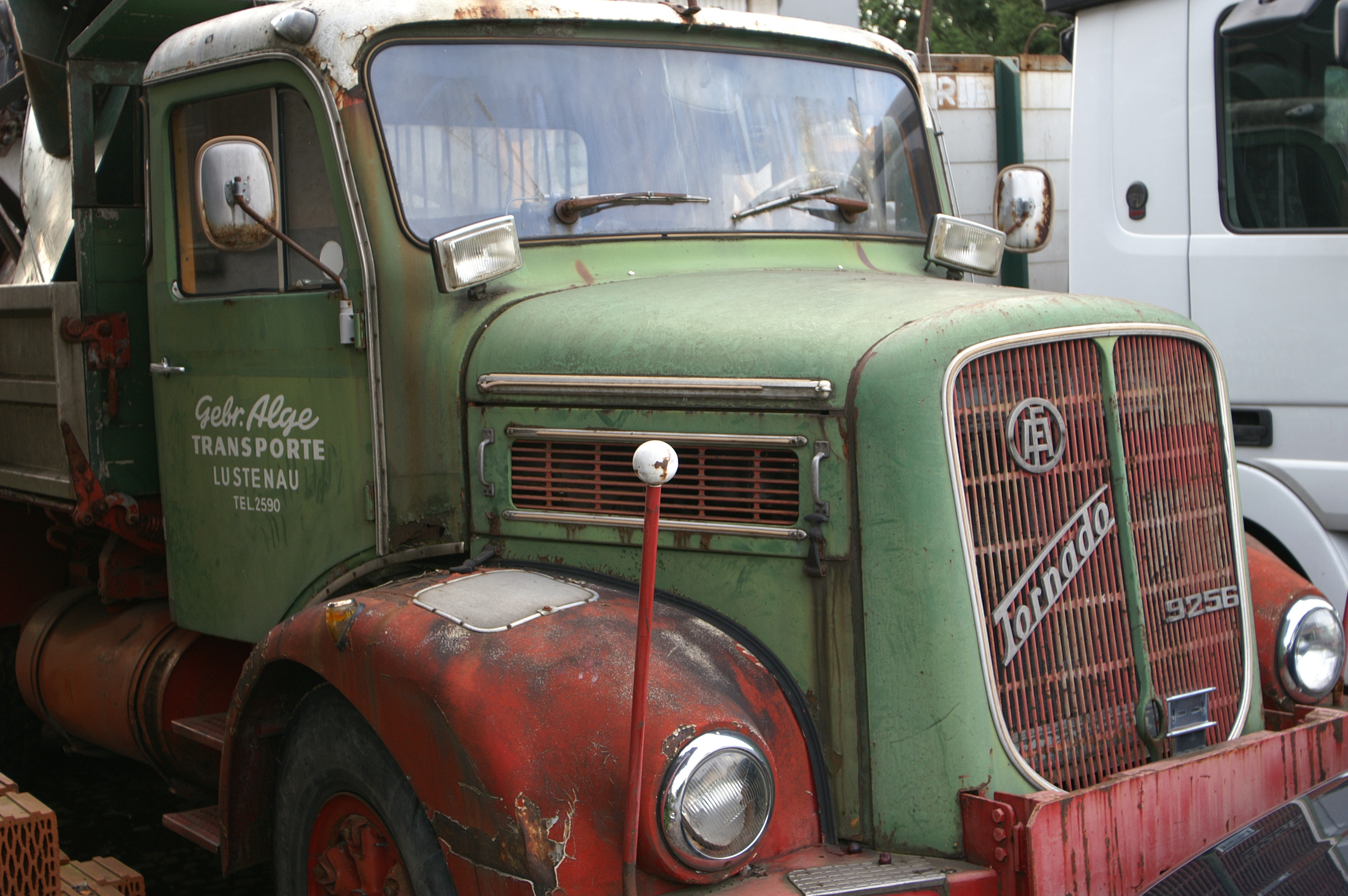
ÖAF Tornado 9256

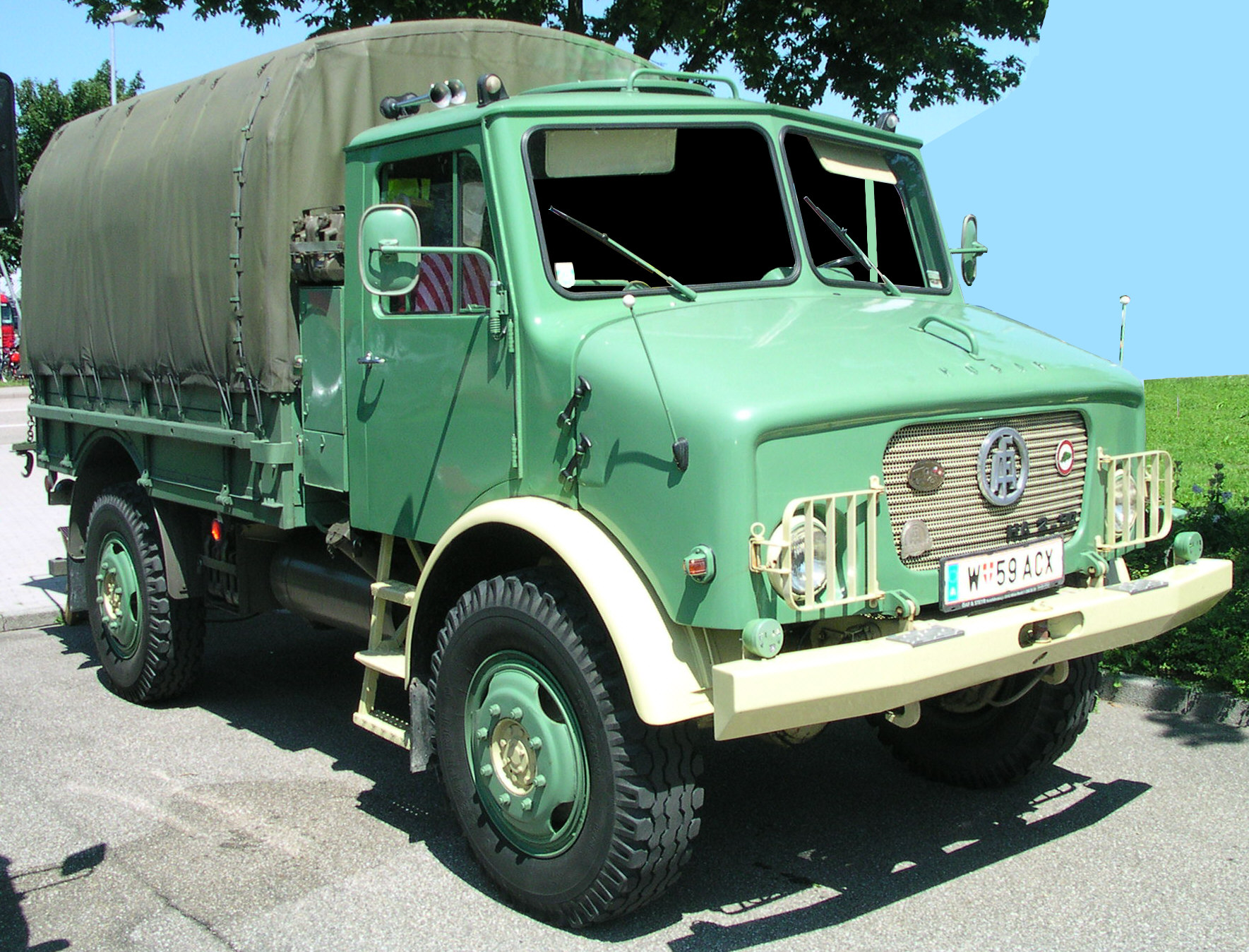
ÖAF Husar

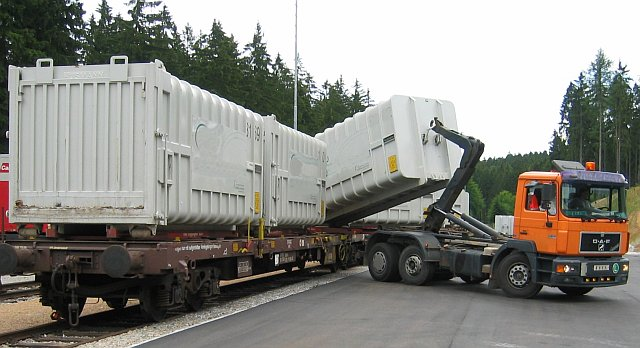
MAN with ÖAF-Grille

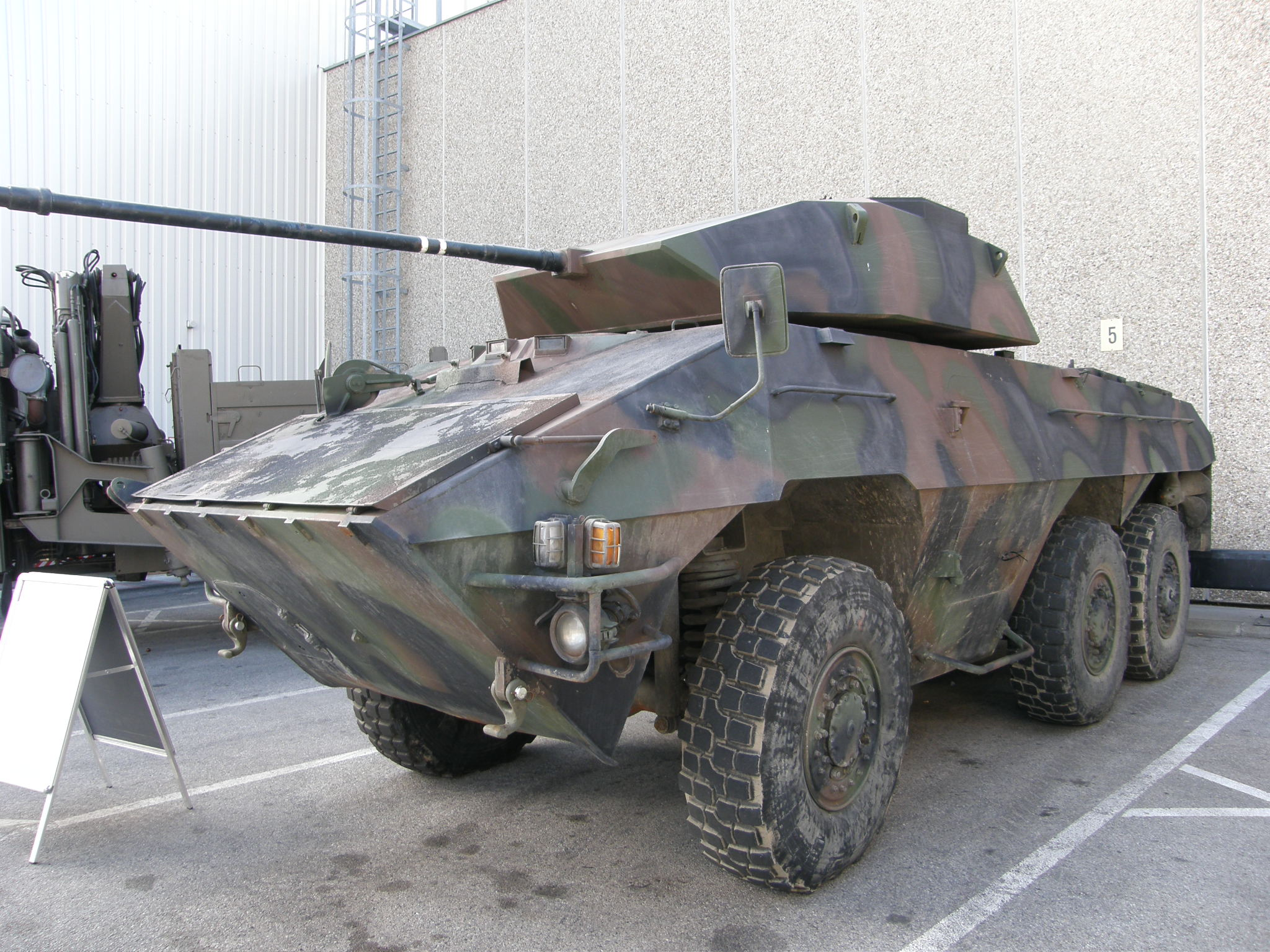
1977 ÖAF light wheeled vehicle
