= Aspergillus fumigatus non-coding RNAs =

Aspergillus fumigatus is a pathogenic filamentous fungus and is responsible for more infections worldwide than any other mould. Studies of the small non-coding RNA transcriptome of this fungus under a variety of different conditions and the subsequent generation of cDNA libraries from size selected small RNA species, identified several non-coding RNAs (ncRNA) within the fungal genome. The ncRNAs identified were further classified as small nucleolar RNAs (snoRNAs), small nuclear RNAs (snRNAs) or novel ncRNAs. The expression of these ncRNAs was also shown to be influenced by developmental stages of the fungus and environmental conditions. Comparative genomics showed that the snoRNAs present within A. fumigatus are conserved across other strains of fungus. This study also identified several partial tRNA sequences within the cDNA libraries which corresponded to either the 5’ or 3’ halves of tRNA molecules. These partial tRNAs are thought to have been created by enonuclolytic cleavage within the anti-codon loop. It has been suggested that these partial tRNA stall protein synthesis however, further studies are required to determine their exact function. The table below summarised the type, genome location and corresponding target sites of the ncRNAs identified in A. fumigatus.

Non-Coding RNAs present in A. fumigatus

Name	Size	Genome Location	Target	Type	Accession number
U1-1	132	Intergenic; Afu1g06980/Afu1g07000		snRNA	AM921915
U1-2	132	Intergenic; Afu4g12490/Afu4g12500		snRNA	AM921916
U5	99	Intergenic; Afu6g12670/Afu6g12680		snRNA	AM921917
U6	50	Intergenic; Afu4g12500/Afu4g12520 Intergenic; Afu2g10150/Afu2g10160		snRNA	AM921918
Afu-191	92	Intergenic; Afu1g10270/Afu1g10280	Gm75 in 5.8S and Am32 in U2	C/D box snoRNA	AM921920
Afu-190	107	Intergenic; Afu4g11320/Afu4g11330	Gm557 in 18S	C/D box snoRNA	AM921921
Afu-198	130	Intergenic; Afu1g02700/Afu1g02680	Cm2856 and Um 2859 in 26S	C/D box snoRNA	AM921922
Afu-294	85	Intergenic; Afu1g09750/Afu1g09760	Cm1851 in 26S; Am43 in 5.8S	C/D box snoRNA	AM921923
Afu-264	103	Intergenic; Afu7g05290/Afu7g05300	Gm2770 and Gm2773 in 26S;	C/D box snoRNA	AM921924
Afu-277	100	Intergenic; Afu1g09740/Afu1g09760	Um2706 in 26S; Am97 in 18S; Cm47 in 5.8S	C/D box snoRNA	AM921925
Afu-188	84	Intergenic; Afu4g11310/Afu4g11320	Am25 and Um26 in 18S	C/D box snoRNA	AM921927
Afu-304	106	Intron 2 (sense); Afu1g09800	Cm2925 in 26S	C/D box snoRNA	AM921929
Afu-380	87	Intergenic; Afu4g06780/Afu4g06770	Um2701 in 26S	C/D box snoRNA	AM921930
Afu-513	129	Intergenic; Afu4g11310/Afu4g11320	Gm1338 and Gm3719 in 26S	C/D box snoRNA	AM921931
Afu-328	75	Intron 2 (sense); Afu6g04570	Gm2792 in 26S	C/D box snoRNA	AM921932
Afu-335	97	Intron 2 (sense); Afu1g04840	Cm2316 in 26S	C/D box snoRNA	AM921933
Afu-438	83	Intergenic; Afu2g15980/Afu2g15970	Am2877 in 26S	C/D box snoRNA	AM921934
Afu-455	92	Intergenic; Afu1g09760/Afu1g09740	Gm1122 in 18S	C/D box snoRNA	AM921935
Afu-40	90	Intergenic; Afu4g11310/Afu4g11320		C/D box snoRNA	AM921936
Afu-514	105	Intergenic; Afu6g03830/Afu6g03840		C/D box snoRNA	AM921937
Afu-515	89	Intergenic; Afu4g11310/Afu4g11320		C/D box snoRNA	AM921938
Afu-199	79	Intron 1 (sense); Afu7g02320		C/D box snoRNA	AM921939
Afu-298	93	Intergenic; Afu1g05080/Afu1g05100		C/D box snoRNA	AM921940
Afu-300	88	Intergenic; Afu4g11310/Afu4g11320		C/D box snoRNA	AM921941
Afu-215	24	Intergenic; Afu5g12870/Afu5g12880		C/D box snoRNA	AM921942
Afu-511	164	Intergenic; Afu1g03400/Afu1g03410		C/D box snoRNA	AM921943
Afu-210	24	Intron 2 (sense); Afu2g03610		C/D box snoRNA	AM921944
Afu-265	23	Intergenic; Afu3g02340/Afu3g02370		C/D box snoRNA	AM921945
Afu-182	219	Intergenic; Afu4g07680/Afu4g07690		novel	AM921946
Afu-202	266	Intergenic; Afu1g10420/Afu1g10430		SRP RNA	AM921947
Afu-254	163	Intergenic; Afu7g04110/Afu7g04120		novel	AM921949
Afu-203	111	Intron 1 (sense); Afu3g14240		novel	AM921950
Afu-309	318	Intergenic; Afu4g10430/Afu4g10420		novel	AM921953
