= Huishan clay figurine =

Chinese folk art

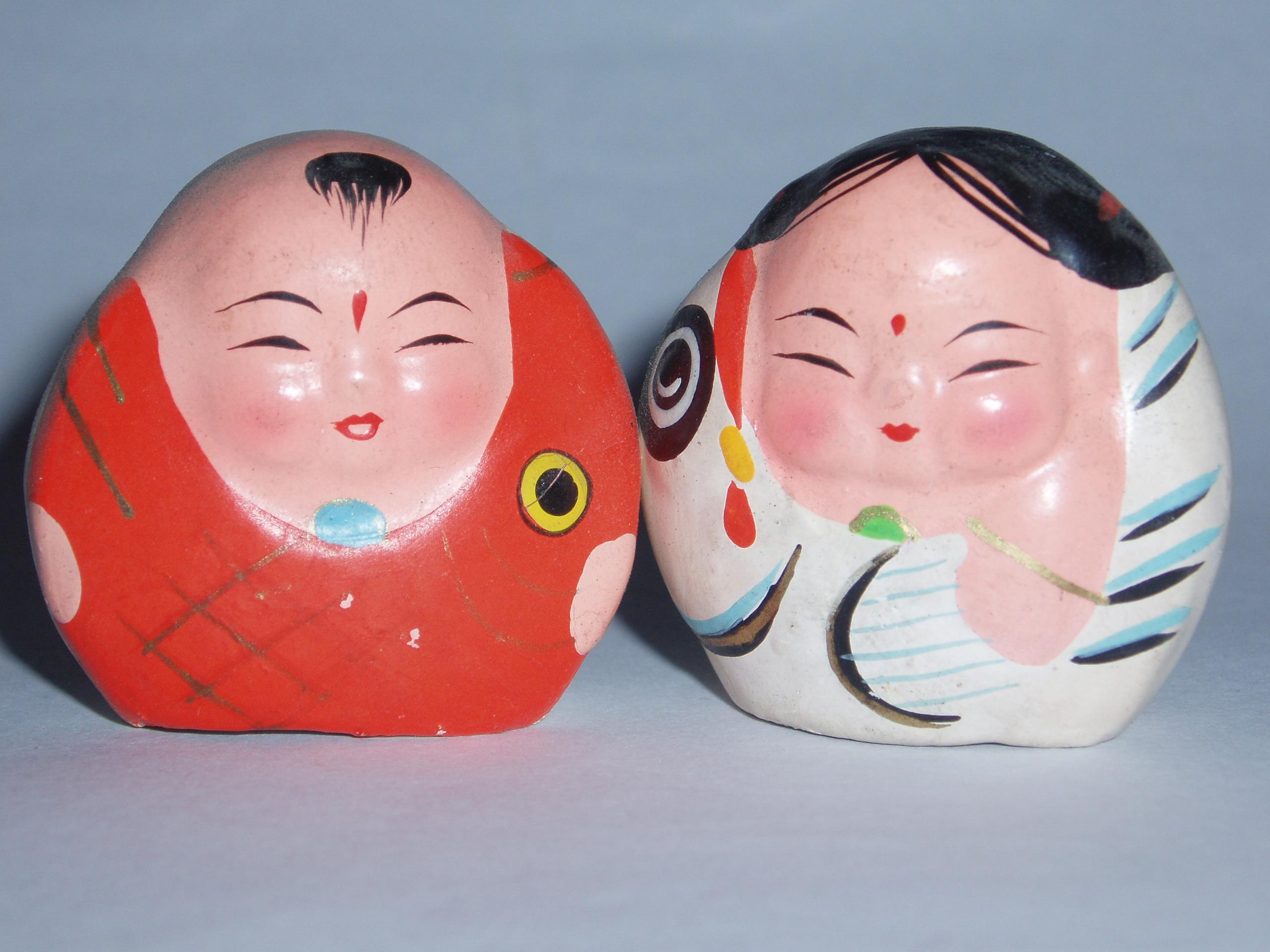
Two A Fu (Chinese: 阿福; pinyin: Ā Fú) figurines, consisting of a boy with a red carp (homonym of the Chinese word for “prosperity”) and a girl with a chicken (homonym of the Chinese word for “auspicious”).

Huishan clay figurine (Chinese: 惠山泥人; pinyin: Huìshān ní rén) is a traditional Chinese folk art in Wuxi, Jiangsu Province, China, with a history of more than 400 years. The production of Wuxi Huishan clay figurines began at the end of the Ming dynasty and developed in the Qing dynasty with specialized Huishan clay craftsmanship workshops. On May 20, 2006, Huishan clay figurine was added to the first batch of National intangible cultural heritage lists with the approval of the State Council of the People's Republic of China.

Huishan clay figurines are clay figures with concise and full shape, smooth and lively lines, bright and eye-catching colours and ingenious and meticulous ideas. The raw material of Huishan clay figurines is black mud, which is taken from the foothills about 1 meter below the ground on the northeast slope of Huishan Mountain. The black mud has excellent "moulding" plasticity as it is delicate and soft for rubbing, consistent when bent and does not crack when dry. Huishan clay figurine was nurtured as splendid splendid folk art and culture with this unique natural resource.

Huishan clay figurines are generally divided into two categories:

- Mould-made "simple" or "coarse" figurines, which are highly stylised, with bright colours, usually drawing inspiration from folk traditions and decorated with symbols of good luck, prosperity, and happiness.
- Purely hand-crafted "fine" figurines, with characters more often drawn from Chinese myths and legends and characters in classical opera.

== History ==
The original Huishan clay figurines production was a family sideline. Most artists were farmers who made gadgets with Huishan clay in their spare time and sold them in temple fairs and during incense, examination and cocoon reports. And Huishan clay figurines are very popular among people from all walks of life at that time.

According to Gujin Tushu Jicheng, there is a record of selling Huishan clay figurines in the late Ming dynasty. The early Huishan clay figurines roughly included Gods and Buddhas, human figures and various animals. The former are mostly traditional folk deities with auspicious meaning and are mainly used for worship; the latter are used as children's toys, also known as "gadgets". Such clay figurines are also called coarse figurines because of the use of moulds, bright colours, rough and exaggerated shapes. And they are mainly sold to children and farmers in both urban and rural areas.

The popularity of Chinese Opera largely influences the subsequent development of the Huishan clay figurine.Kunqiang opera was popular in Wuxi from the mid Ming dynasty to Qing dynasty, while Hui opera and Peking opera are often performed in Wuxi in the early and mid-Qing dynasty. Meanwhile, folk "Grassroot troupes" often perform local Opera during the slack season. In Huishan, there have been many temples and ancestral halls, and prominent temples and ancestral halls have staged performances for rewarding gods or ancestors since ancient times. Various performances are more active during the incense season, silkworm fairs, temple fairs, and genealogy reviving in ancestral halls. These Opera performances provided an opportunity for folk artists engaged in the production of clay figurines to observe and design their clay figurines. As a result, in the early products of Huishan clay figurine, there appeared small Opera figures made with a single mould board with a height of no more than 10 cm and were called "small boardoperas". With the rise of Kunqu Opera and Peking Opera, the development of Huishan clay figurineshas also entered a mature stage. A new type of Huishan clay figurines appeared called "hand-squeezed opera", which mainly expresses Kunqu Opera and Peking opera characters. With the themes like plot characters in operas, myths, legends and folk tale, at this stage, Huishan artists used hand-squeezing as the primary method to create artistic clay figurine. Compared with the "coarse goods" made with simple moulds, these hand-squeezed operas are called "fine goods" with more vivid and natural shape, richer and pleasing colours, and more exquisite decorations.

During the Qianlong period of the Qing dynasty, small professional workshops such as Yuan, Jiang, Zhu, and Qian appeared to conduct seasonal production. During the Xianfeng period of the Qing dynasty, the production of Huishan clay figurines began to flourish, and several large professional shops, such as Qian Wanfeng, Jiang Wansheng, Zhang Wanfeng, Hu Wansheng, and Zhou Kunji, opened one after another. Since then, due to the prosperous sales of clay figurines year by year, the number of workshops has continued to increase, and the scale has also been expanded. The production of clay figurines has also changed from a sideline and semi-sideline business to perennial production, and an industry has been formed.

After the Taiping Heavenly Kingdom movement, local industry and commerce in Wuxi developed rapidly, with merchants from land and water terminals gathered. The market of Huishan clay figurines expanded, especially the urban market, because of the increasing demand. The exchange and mutual influence among various traditional folk arts of different regions benefitted the development of the clay figurines. In addition, Huishan clay figurines had already possessed a relatively high artistic level and a solid folk foundation. Therefore, Huishan clay figurines developed into the most prosperous period in the following half a century.

From the end of the Qing dynasty to the founding of The People's Republic of China, people's livelihood activities were turbulent because of frequent wars. Thus, the art of clay figurines suffered severe damage, especially during The Second World War, that workshops successively closed down and artists lost their jobs. After the Second Sino-Japanese War, although the production of Huishan clay figurines has recovered, it has lost its original simplicity and beauty that great changes have taken place in the content of the performance.

After the founding of The People's Republic of China in 1949, Huishan Clay Figure Industry was revived. According to the "Wuxi Clay Figure GypsumIndustry Business Registration Survey Data", there are 269 business registration units from 1950 to 1951, including 15 in the urban area of Wuxi, 46 in Huishan and 208 households workshop. In 1954, the "Wuxi Clay figure Gypsum Craft Supply and Marketing Cooperative" was established in Wuxi to unify the management of clay figure artists. Meanwhile, Jiangsu Huishan Clay Sculpture Creation Research Institute was established, which was later restructured as the Huishan clay figurine factory in 1958. However, the Huishan clay figurine industry was severely damaged in the early days of the "Cultural Revolution", as many historical works and moulds were destroyed. It was not until May 1978 that the Wuxi clay figurine research institute was re-established.

After that, the Chinese government have implemented various auxiliary measures to preserve the Huishan clay figurines, including organizing artists to return to workshops, collecting works and moulds of Huishan clay figurines from the past dynasties and recruiting artists and scholars for relevant research. In September 2011, the Chinese Clay Figure Museum was established in Wuxi on the site of the original Huishan Clay Figure Factory. The museum was designed by Japanese architect Kengo Kuma. It has collections of clay figure works from different genres. This is also the clay figure theme museum with the highest specifications and the most exhibits in China.

== Characteristics ==
=== Modeling characteristics ===
==== Coarse Huishan clay figurines ====
Their shapes are concise and exaggerated, with a big head and a short body, a big square face, and a clear mouth and nose. Since Coarse goods are mostly printed with single-piece moulds or two-sided moulds, artists make the figure shape round and smooth in block surface transition to facilitate the demolding. With the high-relief method, artists created undulating contours that could not only adapt to the production of printing blanks, but also ensure the smooth start of the coloured drawing. A considerable part of the Huishan clay figurines (coarsegoods) has a flat arc on the back without any shape. Therefore, they have the artistic characteristics of being simple, stable and strong.

==== Fine Huishan clay figurines ====
Most hand-formed figurines representing opera characters have been made with folk skills that formed traditional specific styles through social customs and folk aesthetics. The first characteristic is exquisite modelling, as exquisite and delicate folk craftsmanship conforms to a more exquisite lifestyle in the wealthy Jiangnan region. The second is the patterned modelling language. The modelling of Huishan clay figures follows the principle of "realism in macro perspectives, exaggeration in small perspectives". Generally, the head is big while the body is small, and the ratio of the body to the head changes moderately to the artistic scale of five to five and a half. The reduced-scale modeling method emphasizes the weight of the clay figure, making them shorter, but more powerful. Especially in the early works, this artistic scale exudes simplicity and elegancy. The third figure is characterized language for different types of character modeling, such as "general’s belly, beauty’s waist, children's legs, old man's back". When artists create a lady figure, they will use "willow waist", "goose egg face", "hanging bile nose", "chestnut beak"," Dan Fengyan", "willow eyebrow", etc.

=== Coloring strokes ===
Huishan clay figurines (coarse goods) are painted with bright colours, and the outlines are rough and freehand. They do not use many colours, mainly with strong primary colours, with few transition colours, and sometimes they are mixed with gold and silver to enhance the visual impact. And subjective colours are often used. For example, cow's paintings use not only cyan but also non-realistic colours such as red, white, black, and yellow, so that cows are not only colourful but also contain the meaning of "five elements " and "fruitfulness". There are two kinds of sketches. One is rough brushstrokes, which are basically in place and approximate; the other is fine brushes and detailed descriptions. The fine brushes are simple but not complicated. The meticulous means that each stroke is designed according to the previously designed finishing.

The Huishan clay figures (fine goods) take the principle of "30% in shape and 70% in colour", so its painting should satisfy "new, clear, uniform, and explosive". Due to the small size of the clay figurines, the colors are mostly high-purity primary colours and strong contrast colours. Generally, works based on Peking Opera have richer colours, while Kunqu Opera works have softer colours. The use of transitional colours is a major feature of hand-squeezed Operas. The brushwork of the fine goods is neat, meticulous, requiring "straight lines to be straight, curves to be flexible, and line boundaries to be clear". The painting of character's face has unique techniques for specific drawing routines, such as "happy, angry, sad, happy, sad" and "loyal, evil, good, and ugly".

=== Pattern decoration ===
The patterns are mostly used only for fine goods. The patterns of hand-squeezed operas are full of changes in density and decoration, and generally gorgeous and bright with folk style. The patterns of the Huishan clay figurines also have relatively fixed principles. For example, the clothing of the old people with identity have the "longevity", "Tuanshou" and "plum and bamboo" patterns, and the beautiful women have "grass flower", "hibiscus flower", "dot flower", "crab melon chrysanthemum", and "Bat flower", and fairy Buddha has the "cloud brocade flower", "five-color cloud flower", while children use ”ball flowers", "hundred flowers" and so on. Huishan clay figurines pay attention to the coordination of large effects and details. The colour blocks and patterns follow the principle of "seeing colors and flowers from a distance", so that they can be seen from far and near. The styles of their clothes are also very particular, and the patterns are consistent with the identity and personality of the characters.

Makeup Luan is a decorative craft of Huishan clay figurines which uses natural materials other than clay to make various props and ornaments. Characters' hair and clothes usually use silk cloth paper, silk woolen cotton, bamboo wood beads, iron wire aluminum sheet or other materials. According to their texture and shape, they are made into standard firearms, flag backs, hair and hair ornaments, cups and tables, which will be installed, inserted, tied, and glued to the reserved parts of the work. And it solves the problem that some parts of the clay figure are easy to break and fall off when made with mud.

== Gallery ==
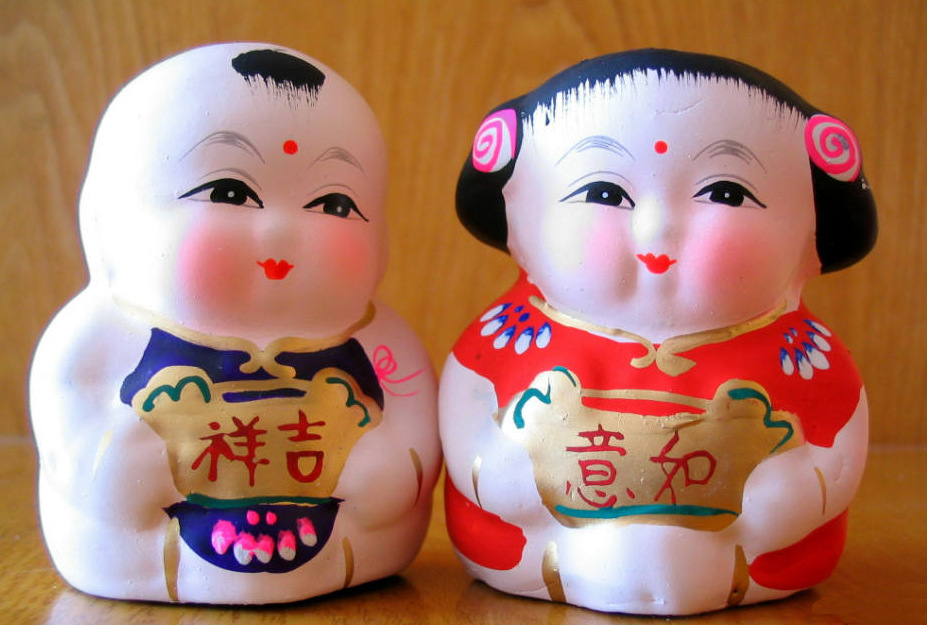
Fu, Xi figurines

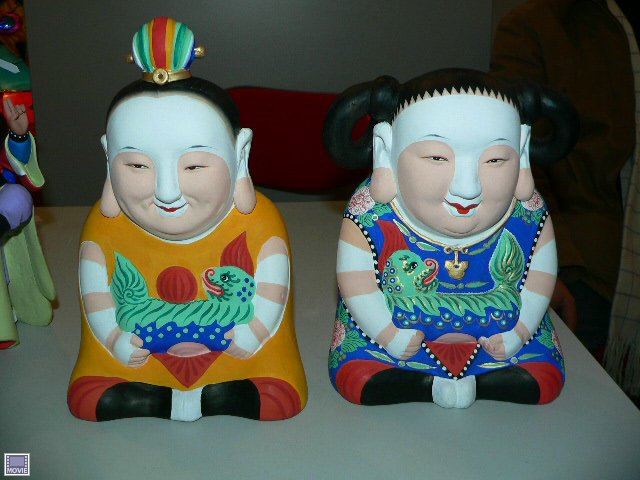
Qing Style

== See also ==
- Yixing clay teapot
