= AF =

AF, af, Af, etc. may refer to:

== Arts and media ==
- Autofocus, of a camera
- A-F Records, Pittsburgh, Pennsylvania
- Almost Family, US TV series
- America First with Nicholas J. Fuentes, a political commentary show hosted by Nick Fuentes that started in 2017

== Places, transportation, and military ==
- Afghanistan, by 2-letter ISO, FIPS 10-4, LOC MARC and obsolete NATO country code
- Agra Fort railway station, Rawatpara, India
- Alabama and Florida Railway (reporting mark AF)
- American Freightways, US trucking company, merged into FedEx Freight
- Air France, IATA code and stock symbol
- AF Guardian, a US Navy warplane
- A US Navy hull classification symbol: Provisions store ship (AF)
- Air force
- Armed forces

== Biology, ecology, and politics ==
- Amniotic fluid
- Atrial fibrillation, an abnormal heart rhythm
- Arcuate fasciculus, a nerve bundle in the brain
- Anaerobic filter, a type of anaerobic digester
- Af, the Köppen climate classification for a tropical rainforest climate
- The Adaptation Fund, for climate change adaptation, UN
- Action Française, a French political movement
- Anarchist Federation (British Isles)
- America First, a political slogan
- Anno Fascista, a year in the Italian Fascist calendar

== Language, telecommunications, and computing ==
- Alliance Française, promoting French language and culture
- Académie française, for French language matters
- Afrikaans language (ISO 639-1 language code AF)
- Acronym Finder, an online database
- "...as fuck", meaning "very", in SMS language
- Amplify-and-Forward, a scheme of relay channel
- Alternative frequency
- Audio frequency
- .af, the top-level Internet domain for Afghanistan
- Anisotropic filtering
- Advanced Format, large hard disk sectors

== Engineering and industry ==
- ÅF, a Swedish technical consulting company
- AF Gruppen, a construction company, Norway
- Across flats (A/F), a measure of hexagonal nut flat size

== Other uses ==
- Abercrombie & Fitch, A&F, US clothing shops
- Adventist Forums, of Seventh-day Adventists
- Af, a Swedish nobiliary particle used in surnames
- Acre-feet
- Attofarad
