= Abradable coating =

Type of material

An abradable coating is a coating made of an abradable material – meaning if it rubs against a more abrasive material in motion, the former will be worn whereas the latter will face no wear. Abradable coatings provide a .1 to .2% performance improvement compared to those without coating.

Abradable coatings are used in aircraft jet engines in the compressor and turbine sections where a minimal clearance is needed between the blade tips and the casing.

Abradable coatings have been in use by aero-engine manufacturers in some form or fashion for roughly 50 years.

Abradable powder coatings provide an economical and environmentally friendly way to improve the efficiency of engines, compressors and pumps by fine-tuning the operational fit of internal components such as pistons, rotors and cases. In typical turbo machinery, the clearance between blade tips and the casing must account for thermal and inertial expansion as well as changes in concentricity due to shock loading events. To prevent catastrophic tip to casing contact, conservatively large clearances must be employed.

In small turboprop aircraft, the angle at which abradable coating is applied is impacted by the necessity of the coating process performed at spray angles less than 60 degrees.

The role of abradable coatings is not only to allow for closer clearances, but to automatically adjust clearances, in-situ, to accept physical events and/or thermal scenarios that may be found in a devices operational history.

== Manufacturing ==
- Thermal spray: Many techniques are available (Plasma, Flame, etc.).
- Sintering: Honeycomb coatings are sintered on the casing
- Casting: in the case of polymer coating.
