= Abradable powder coatings =

Class of abradable materials

Abradable Powder Coatings (APC), also known as Additive/Abradable Powder Coatings (AAPCs), are a class of abradable materials that are applied using standard powder coating technology. They are used for clearance control, sealing and lubrication over a wide range of temperatures in oiled and dry devices. Application of the coatings is inexpensive and environmentally friendly.

Abradable coatings are made up of materials that will abrade, or wear off, when they rub against a mating surface. The coating acts as a sacrificial layer when it comes in contact with another surface so that the base material underneath is protected and remains unharmed.

Abradable Powder Coatings safely reduce operating clearances and friction to improve the efficiency of compressors, pumps, engines, blowers, etc. A Tier 1 automotive supplier reports increased volumetric efficiencies and enhanced sealing on supercharger rotor sets through the use of a patented abradable powder coating.

Abradable Powder Coating provides engine benefits such as higher efficiency, reduced noise and greater durability when applied on pistons. The coating can be applied thick so that during the initial operation the coated component wears in until its ideal geometry is reached under temperature and load. Normally there is no change to the base metal component dimensions and the parts require no post-machining before assembly.

Abradable Powder Coatings (APC's) on piston skirts and lands are advancing performance and life of cylinder kits in three principal ways:

1. APC coatings lap in to permanently improve piston-to-bore fit, reducing unwanted motion and creating a thin, resilient oil film for lower friction with less wear.
2. Better piston fit in each bore keeps rings square to the cylinder and settled for improved sealing, heat transfer and oil management.
3. All across the skirts (not just at the gage point) APC safely removes Integrated Skirt Clearance (ISC) volume between piston skirt and bore surface to limit destructive motion and accelerations between cylinder kit components.

These coatings can dramatically improve efficiency in oil pumps if, for example, less expensive components such as cast pump housings are used with reasonably loose tolerances. An abradable coating can be a highly cost-effective method of improving the tolerances and efficiency of the impeller-housing combination without resorting to much more costly machining of the original components. As an incidental benefit, if an abradable coating has allowed an efficiency increase in a pump, it may be possible to downsize the pump to be used while still delivering the necessary flow/pressure and so save weight or packaging space.
