= Tip clearance =

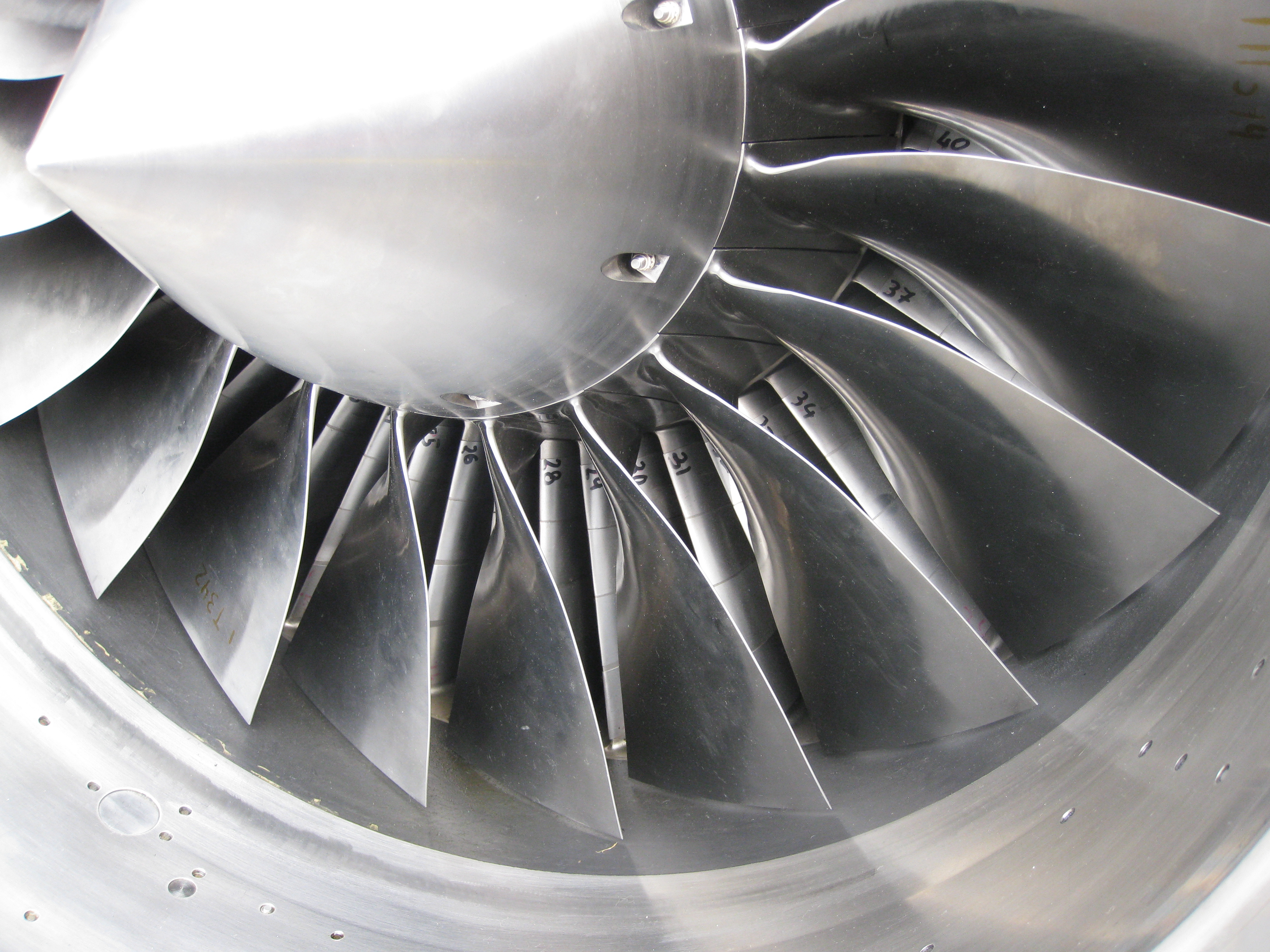
The inlet of an EJ200, showing rotor and stator blades. The narrow clearance between the rotor (first set of blades) and the casing is visible.

Tip clearance is the distance between the tip of a rotating airfoil and a stationary part.

- Gas turbine: Rotor blade and casing
- Propeller (ship or aircraft): Propeller and structure
  - Ground tip clearance
- Wind turbine: blade and tower
